= Opuntia lagunae =

Conservation status
- Least Concern (IUCN 3.1)

Scientific classification
- Kingdom: Plantae
- Clade: Tracheophytes
- Clade: Angiosperms
- Clade: Eudicots
- Order: Caryophyllales
- Family: Cactaceae
- Subfamily: Opuntioideae
- Tribe: Opuntieae
- Genus: Opuntia
- Species: O. lagunae

Binomial name
- Opuntia lagunae E.M.Baxter

Species of prickly pear cactus

Opuntia lagunae, commonly known as the Laguna prickly pear or the shrubby prickly pear, is a species of prickly pear cactus in the family Cactaceae. It was described by Edgar Martin Baxter.

== Description ==
Opuntia lagunae on average reaches 1 m (3 feet) tall, with grey-green pads (cladodes) that are glaucous in color. Barbed, white spines, that are 3 cm (1.18 inches) long, and yellow flower blooms that are 7 cm (2.75 inches) wide. Areoles have sharp, yellow varied glochids. The fruit is 7 cm (2.75 inches) long, with a deep red coloration, and is very sweet in flavor. Produces oxalic acid, especially in older parts of the cactus.

== Distribution and habitat ==
Opuntia lagunae grows primarily in Baja California Sur, specifically at the highest point of the protected Sierra de la Laguna, where the only known populations reside. It grows at elevations of around 2000 m (6561 feet), in semi-arid climates. The species natural range is made up of tropical-dry deciduous forests on granitic soils.

== Conservation ==
Opuntia lagunae is currently listed as "Least Concern" by the IUCN Red List, for there are not many severe to semi-severe threats to its natural range. Despite its exclusivity, there is still enough groupings and individuals for the species population to remain stable, although this is subject to potentially change in the future.

== Uses ==
Opuntia lagunae is commonly used as a local cuisine, and are often cooked as a vegetable. The sweet fruits are also used in local cuisine, but are often eaten plain. Segments of the cactus are partially used to an extent as a medicinal herb, being able to reduce inflammation, help control blood sugar levels in adult-onset diabetes, and reduce high blood cholesterol levels.
