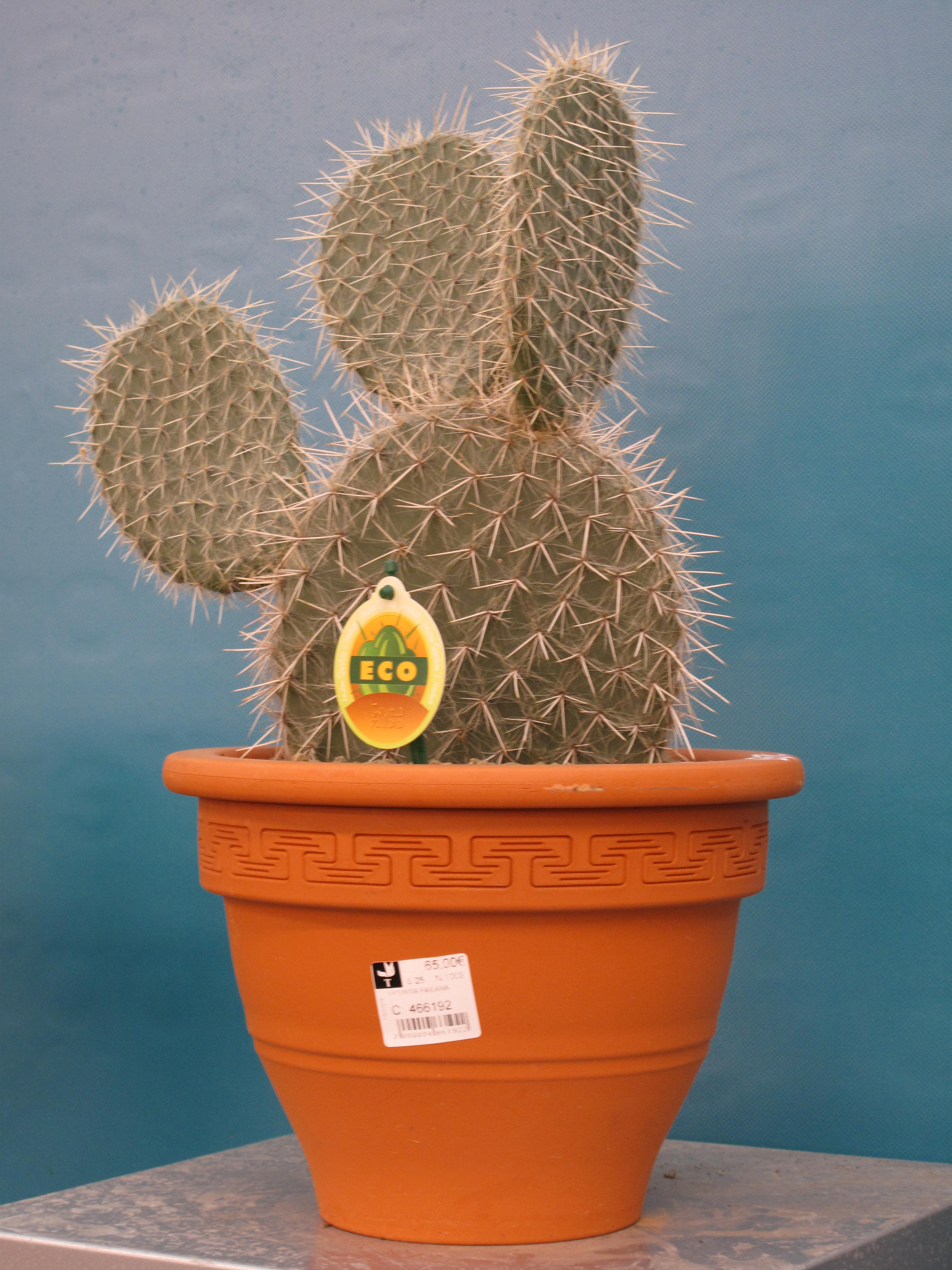
- Opuntia pailana in a garden centre

Scientific classification
- Kingdom: Plantae
- Clade: Tracheophytes
- Clade: Angiosperms
- Clade: Eudicots
- Order: Caryophyllales
- Family: Cactaceae
- Genus: Opuntia
- Species: O. pailana

Binomial name
- Opuntia pailana Weing.

= Opuntia pailana =

Species of cactus

Opuntia pailana is a species of the genus Opuntia in the family Cactaceae. The name pailana comes from the sierra de la Paila in the state of Coahuila Mexico where it was discovered.

== Description ==
The first description was published by Wilhelm Weingart in 1929 in the book Monatsschrift der Deutschen Kakteen-Gesellschaft. Band 1, Nummer 9, 1929, S. 167–169.

Like most of the species of the genus Opuntia, Opuntia pailana is a shrubby plant with cladodes (leaves racket-shaped) up to one meter high.

The cladodes are blue-green or, when getting older, green-yellow, 10 to 14 centimeters long and up to 9 centimeters wide. The areoles with dark color support grey-yellow glochids, with long white hairs of trichome.

The areoles also support thorns 2 to 3 centimeters long with white or light grey color, with some darker stripes. Most often, they are three or six to eight on older plants.

== Horticulture ==
This plant must receive full sunlight. On average, the plant should be spaced around 60 cm apart for full effect. This cactus is very hardy in desert/dry situations and is draught-tolerable.

Opuntia pailana has a flower that blooms a brilliant yellow when healthy.

When propagating, use cuttings from either the thick stalk or the fleshy cladodes. Allow the cut surface to heal slightly before planting.

To collect the seeds, allow unblemished fruit to ripen, then clean and dry the seeds. Unblemished fruit must be significantly overripe before harvesting seed. Then, clean and dry the seeds. The seed can be successfully stored in an airtight container if properly cleaned.

From seed, sow directly after the last frost.
