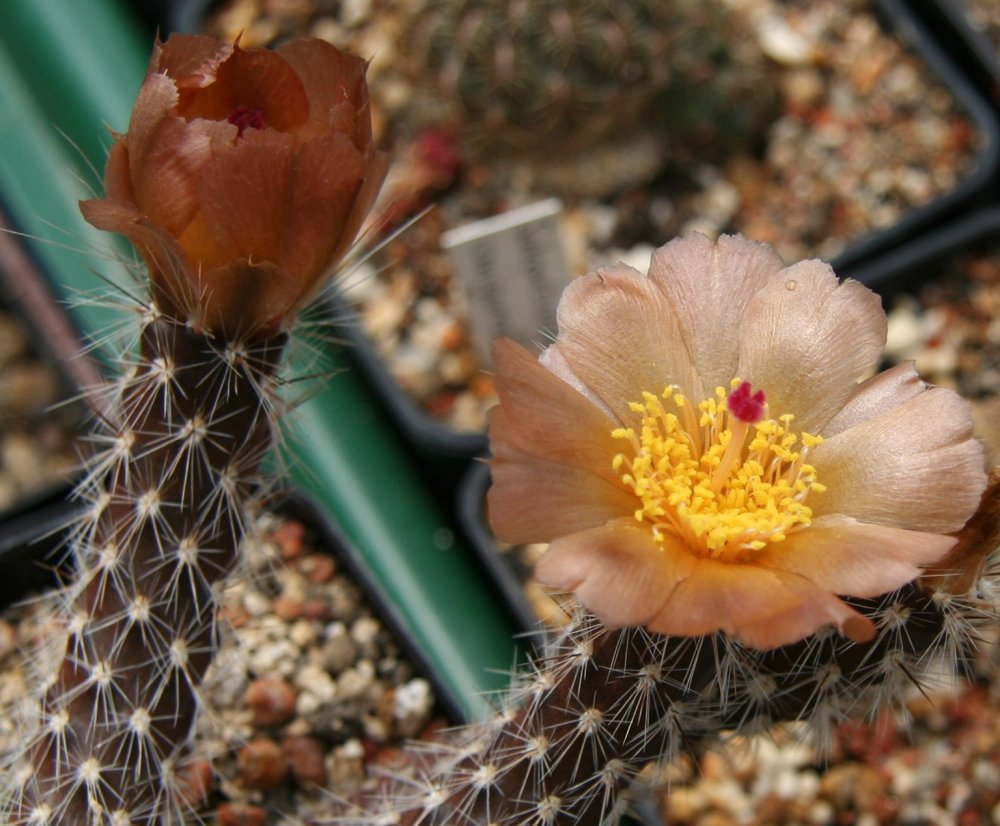
- In bloom

Scientific classification
- Kingdom: Plantae
- Clade: Tracheophytes
- Clade: Angiosperms
- Clade: Eudicots
- Order: Caryophyllales
- Family: Cactaceae
- Genus: Pterocactus
- Species: P. valentini

Binomial name
- Pterocactus valentini Speg.

Synonyms
- Opuntia valentini (Speg.) Kiessling; Pterocactus pumilus Britton & Rose

= Pterocactus valentini =

Species of flowering plant

Pterocactus valentini is a species of flowering plant in the family Cactaceae, native to southern Argentina. Their fruit are samaras.
