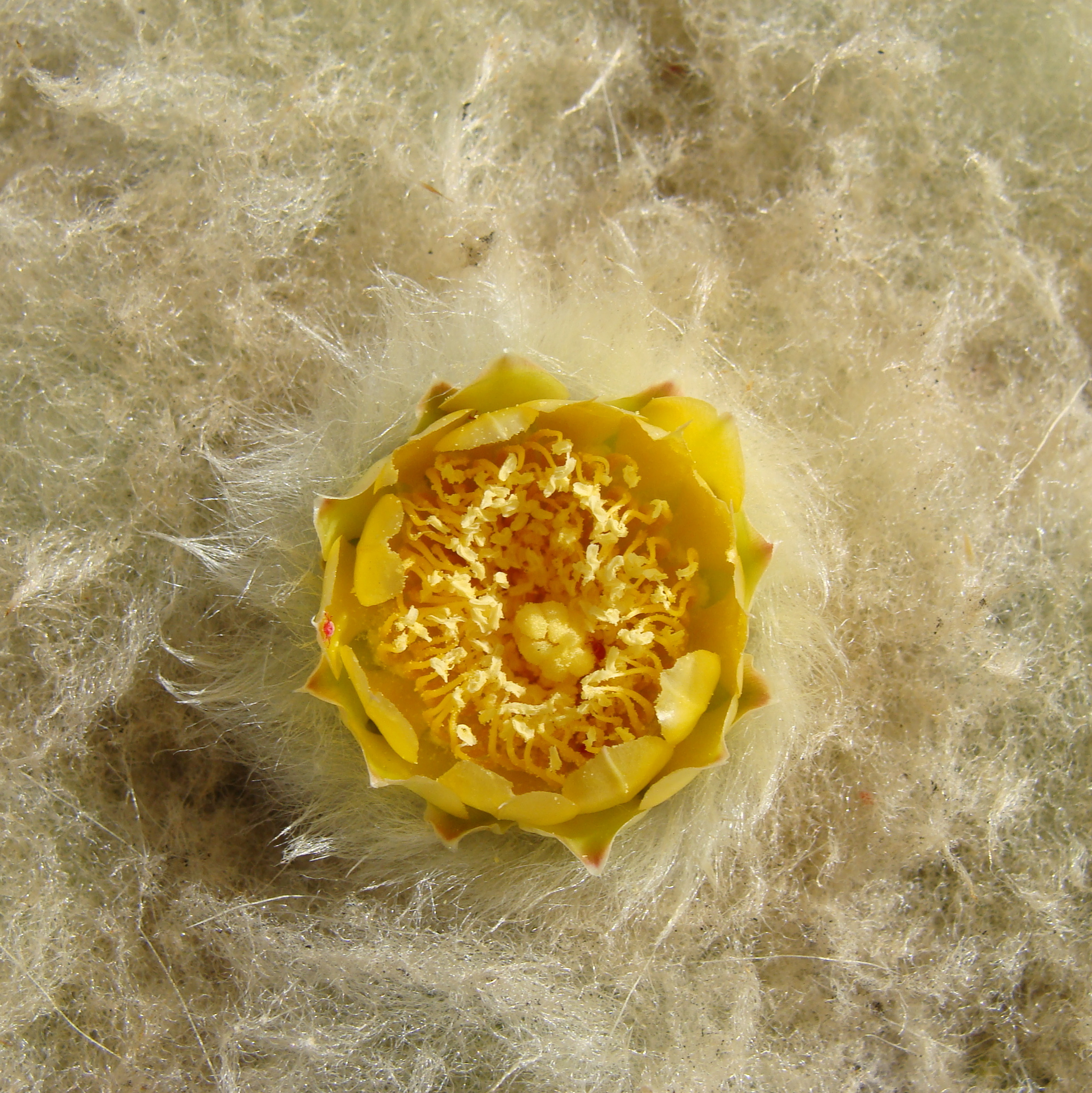

Conservation status
- Vulnerable (IUCN 3.1)

Scientific classification
- Kingdom: Plantae
- Clade: Tracheophytes
- Clade: Angiosperms
- Clade: Eudicots
- Order: Caryophyllales
- Family: Cactaceae
- Tribe: Tephrocacteae
- Genus: Punotia; D.R.Hunt
- Species: P. lagopus

Binomial name
- Punotia lagopus (K.Schum.) D.R.Hunt

Synonyms
- List: Andinopuntia lagopus (K.Schum.) Guiggi 2011; Austrocylindropuntia lagopus (K.Schum.) I.Crook, J.Arnold & M.Lowry 2003; Opuntia lagopus K.Schum. 1903; Tephrocactus lagopus (K.Schum.) Backeb. 1936; Andinopuntia lagopus subsp. septentrionalis Guiggi 2016; Austrocylindropuntia lagopus subsp. malyanus (Rausch) Ostolaza 2014; Austrocylindropuntia malyana (Rausch) F.Ritter 1981; Opuntia lagopus var. aurea (Rauh & Backeb.) G.D.Rowley 1958; Opuntia lagopus subvar. brachycarpa (Rauh & Backeb.) G.D.Rowley 1958; Opuntia lagopus var. leucolagopus (Rauh & Backeb.) G.D.Rowley 1958; Opuntia lagopus var. pachyclada (Rauh & Backeb.) G.D.Rowley 1958; Tephrocactus lagopus var. aureus Rauh & Backeb. 1956 publ. 1957; Tephrocactus lagopus subvar. brachycarpus Rauh & Backeb. (1956 publ. 1957; Tephrocactus lagopus var. leucolagopus Rauh & Backeb. 1956 publ. 1957; Tephrocactus lagopus var. pachycladus Rauh & Backeb. 1956 publ. 1957; Tephrocactus malyanus Rausch 1971

= Punotia =

Genus of cacti

Punotia is a monotypic genus of flowering plants belonging to the family Cactaceae. The only species is Punotia lagopus.

== Description ==
Punotia lagopus grows in dense, large cushions up to over 1 meter in diameter and 60 centimeters high. Its short, cylindrical, bumpy, and densely hairy shoots can reach up to 25 centimeters or more, sometimes shorter and spherical. Fine hairs up to 2 centimeters long emerge from the areoles in a single row. Sparse, white, slightly sloping glochids are 1 to 1.5 centimeters long. Leaf rudiments, up to 7 millimeters long, are hidden among the hairs. A single yellow spine is 2 to 2.5 centimeters long.

The golden yellow flowers are 2 to 3 centimeters long, with hairy pericarpels towards the tip. The egg-shaped, thin-walled fruits are light yellow-green before ripening to light pink.

== Distribution ==
The species is found in the highlands of Peru in the region of Puno around Imata and Macusani to the department of La Paz in Bolivia, growing in humid grasslands at altitudes of 4100 to 4700 meters.

== Taxonomy ==
This species was first described as Opuntia lagopus by Karl Moritz Schumann in 1903, the species name "lagopus" means 'hare's foot,' referring to its densely hairy shoots. David Richard Hunt reclassified it as Punotia lagopus in 2011.
