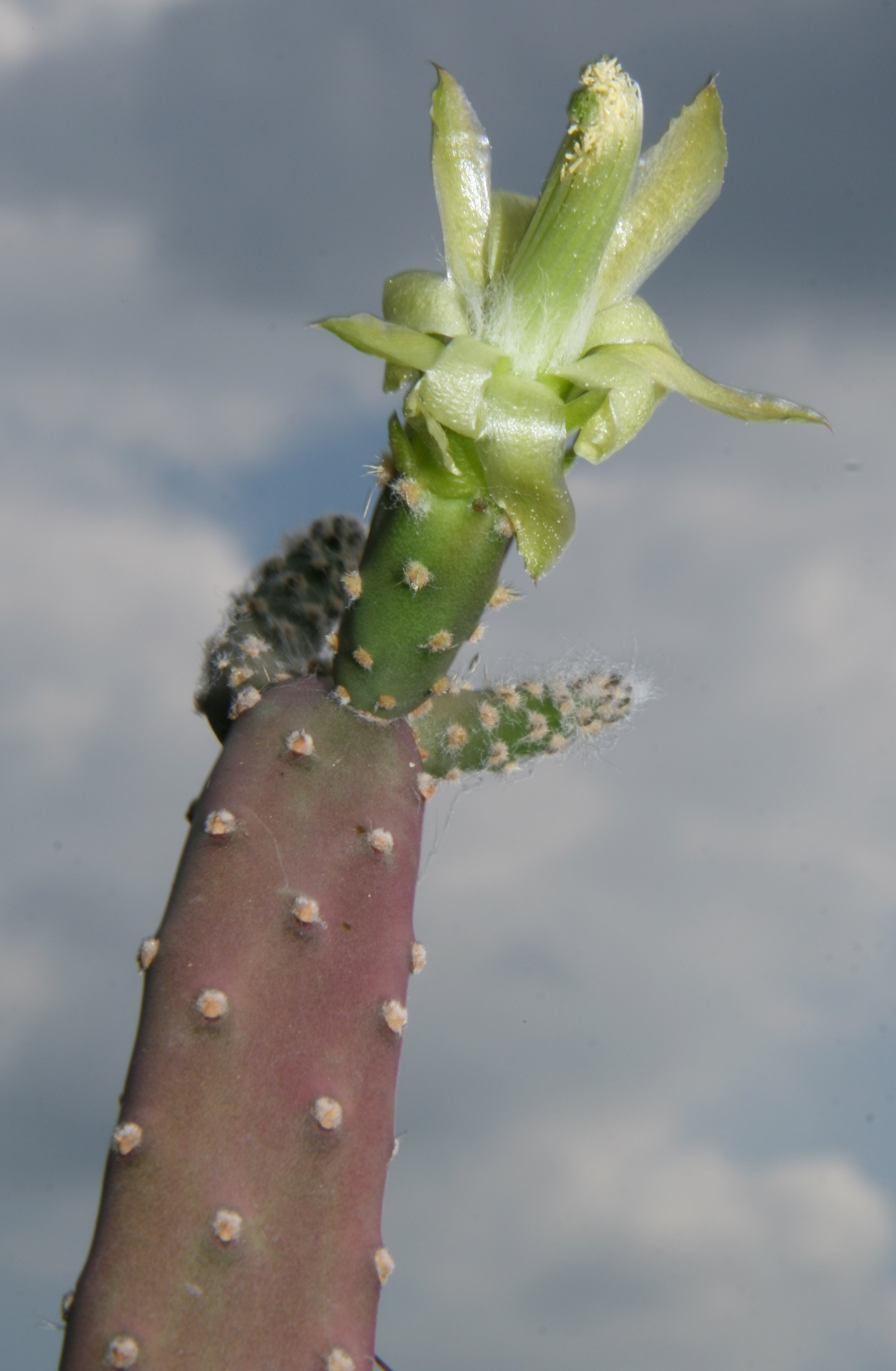

Conservation status
- Vulnerable (IUCN 3.1)

Scientific classification
- Kingdom: Plantae
- Clade: Tracheophytes
- Clade: Angiosperms
- Clade: Eudicots
- Order: Caryophyllales
- Family: Cactaceae
- Genus: Tacinga
- Species: T. braunii

Binomial name
- Tacinga braunii Esteves

= Tacinga braunii =

Species of cactus

Tacinga braunii is a species of plant in the family Cactaceae.

== Distribution and habitat ==
It is endemic to Eastern Brazil where its distribution is restricted to the north-eastern region of Minas Gerais in the valley of the river Jequitinhonha, where it grows on gneiss or granite rock outcrops. It is pollinated by hummingbirds. Its natural habitats are subtropical or tropical dry forests and hot deserts. It is threatened by habitat loss.
