= Cumulopuntia pentlandii =

Conservation status
- Least Concern (IUCN 3.1)

Scientific classification
- Kingdom: Plantae
- Clade: Tracheophytes
- Clade: Angiosperms
- Clade: Eudicots
- Order: Caryophyllales
- Family: Cactaceae
- Genus: Cumulopuntia
- Species: C. pentlandii

Binomial name
- Cumulopuntia pentlandii (Salm-Dyck) F.Ritter

Synonyms
- This species has 48 synonyms: (see text)

Species of cacti

Cumulopuntia pentlandii, commonly known in Spanish as puscaya, is a species of succulent flowering plant in the genus Cumulopuntia, within the family Cactaceae. It is native to northwestern Argentina, Bolivia, northern Chile, and Peru, where it is found in high-altitude desert habitats in the Andes. It forms cushions which are heavily armed with golden-brown spines.

== Description ==
Cumulopuntia pentlandii is a low-growing, laterally-branching species of cactus that forms cushions or mounds. The stems are articulated, and are made up of small spherical to shortened-ovate segments, which with age become wider than they are long. The epidermis is grass-green in color.

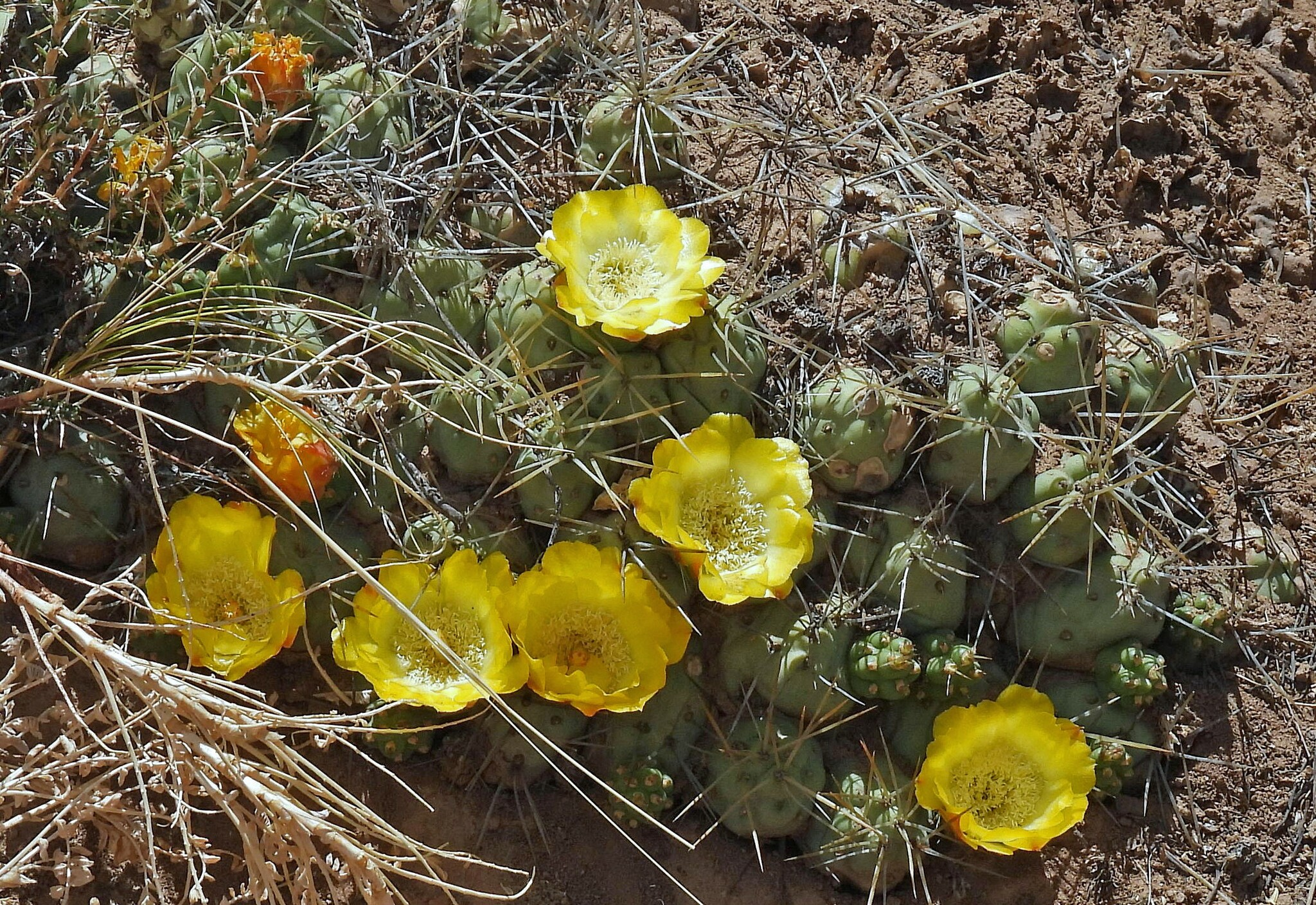
Plant in flower

Each segment possesses 10-15 areoles on the top part; these are up to 2.5 cm long. The tubercules are short and poorly-defined, and tend to disappear over time. The areoles are covered in yellowish wool, and spines develop on the upper areoles. On these, 1-6 spines develop on the lower margin; these spines are off-white, bristle-like, curved outwards, and diverging. On some segments, the spines may be completely absent.The flowers are short, yellow or red in color, and grow up to 3 cm long. The pericarpel is wide, and possesses several areoles without spines on its upper part. The fruit is barrel-shaped and measures up to 3.5 cm long. It is almost completely spineless.

== Distribution and habitat ==
Cumulopuntia pentlandii is native to northwestern Argentina, Bolivia, northern Chile, and Peru. It is mainly found in desert or dry scrubland biomes at elevations of 2000 to 4400 meters above sea level.

This species grows at high altitudes in the Andes in areas where 3 to 5 months can pass without precipitation. It is present in areas of high solar exposure, generally in flat areas or on north-facing slopes. It is found growing in sandy soils and not in rocky soils.

== Taxonomy ==
Cumulopuntia pentlandii was first described as Opuntia pentlandii, a name published in 1845 by the German botanist Joseph de Salm-Reifferscheidt-Dyck in the scientific journal Allgemeine Gartenzeitung 13: 387.

Later, the German botanist Friedrich Ritter transferred this species to the genus Cumulopuntia, renaming it Cumulopuntia pentlandii. He registered these changes in the scientific journal Kakteen in Südamerika 2: 488, published in 1980.

Etymology

- Cumulopuntia: The genus name is derived from the Latin cŭmŭlus (meaning "heap" or "pile") and the genus Opuntia (to which this genus is similar), referring to the plant's growth habit.
- pentlandii: The specific epithet honors Irish geographer and naturalist Joseph Barclay Pentland.

Synonyms

- Austrocylindropuntia boliviana (Salm-Dyck) G.D.Rowley, 2006
- Cactus bolivianus (Salm-Dyck) Lem., 1868
- Cactus pentlandii (Salm-Dyck) Lem., 1868
- Cumulopuntia boliviana (Salm-Dyck) F.Ritter, 1980
- Cumulopuntia famatinensis F.Ritter, 1980
- Cumulopuntia fulvicoma (Rauh & Backeb.) E.F.Anderson, 1999
- Cumulopuntia galerasensis F.Ritter, 1981
- Cumulopuntia pampana F.Ritter, 1980
- Cumulopuntia pentlandii var. colchana (Cárdenas) F.Ritter, 1980
- Cumulopuntia pyrrhacantha (K.Schum.) F.Ritter, 1981
- Maihueniopsis boliviana (Salm-Dyck) R.Kiesling, 1984
- Maihueniopsis pentlandii (Salm-Dyck) R.Kiesling, 1984
- Opuntia asplundii (Backeb.) G.D.Rowley, 1958
- Opuntia backebergii G.D.Rowley, 1958
- Opuntia boliviana Salm-Dyck, 1845
- Opuntia chichensis var. colchana (Cárdenas) G.D.Rowley, 1958
- Opuntia cucumiformis Griffiths, 1916
- Opuntia fulvicoma (Rauh & Backeb.) G.D.Rowley, 1958
- Opuntia galerasensis (F.Ritter) D.R.Hunt, 1997
- Opuntia pentlandii Salm-Dyck, 1845 (basionym)
- Opuntia pentlandii var. fuauxiana (Backeb.) G.D.Rowley, 1958
- Opuntia pyrrhacantha K.Schum., 1898
- Opuntia pyrrhacantha var. leucolutea (Backeb.) G.D.Rowley, 1958
- Opuntia rarissima (Backeb.) G.D.Rowley, 1958
- Opuntia rossiana var. fuauxiana (Backeb.) Kiessling, 2000
- Opuntia subinermis Backeb., 1935
- Opuntia wilkeana (Backeb.) G.D.Rowley, 1958
- Tephrocactus albiscoparius Backeb., 1962
- Tephrocactus asplundii Backeb., 1956 publ. 1957
- Tephrocactus bolivianus (Salm-Dyck) Backeb., 1950
- Tephrocactus catacanthus Backeb., 1963
- Tephrocactus chichensis var. colchanus Cárdenas, 1952
- Tephrocactus curvispinus Backeb., 1977
- Tephrocactus flexispinus Backeb., 1963
- Tephrocactus fulvicomus Rauh & Backeb., 1956 publ. 1957
- Tephrocactus melanacanthus Backeb., 1963
- Tephrocactus microclados Backeb., 1962
- Tephrocactus minor Backeb., 1953
- Tephrocactus neopentlandii Y.Itô, 1981
- Tephrocactus pentlandii (Salm-Dyck) Backeb., 1936
- Tephrocactus pentlandii var. adpressus Backeb., 1966
- Tephrocactus pentlandii var. fuauxianus Backeb., 1953
- Tephrocactus pyrrhacanthus (K.Schum.) Backeb., 1958
- Tephrocactus pyrrhacanthus var. leucoluteus Backeb., 1956 publ. 1957
- Tephrocactus rarissimus Backeb., 1936
- Tephrocactus subinermis (Backeb.) Backeb., 1936
- Tephrocactus virgultus Backeb., 1966
- Tephrocactus wilkeanus Backeb., 1936

== Conservation status ==
On the IUCN Red List, Cumulopuntia pentlandii is classified at being "Least Concern" (LC), meaning that this species has a wide geographical distribution and its populations are not currently showing a significant decline on a global scale

There are no known significant threats to the survival of this species. However, it is eaten by wild and domesticated New World camelids.

== Cultivation ==
This species is cultivated mainly as an ornamental. It can be propagated vegetatively by cuttings, or by seed. It does not tolerate constantly hot conditions, and must be in a well-ventilated and very well-lit location. It should be planted in a well-draining substrate and its container should be deep to accommodate the plant's large taproot. It is cold-hardy to -8 ºC (17.6 ºF), and can tolerate occasional snowfall for a couple of weeks per year.

== Gallery ==
In habitat in El Puente, Tarija Department, Bolivia

Mounding growth habit

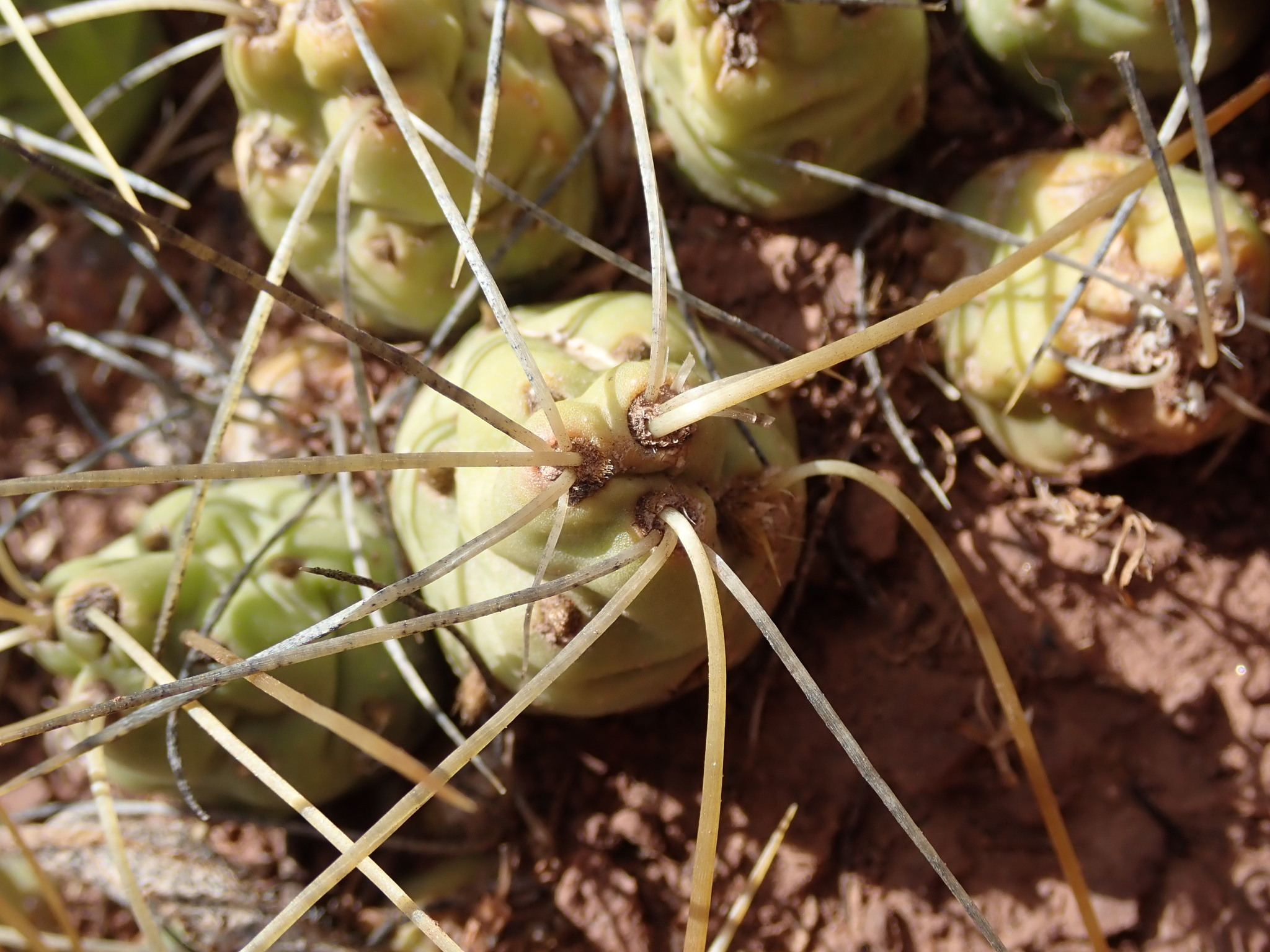
Spines

Plant in flower

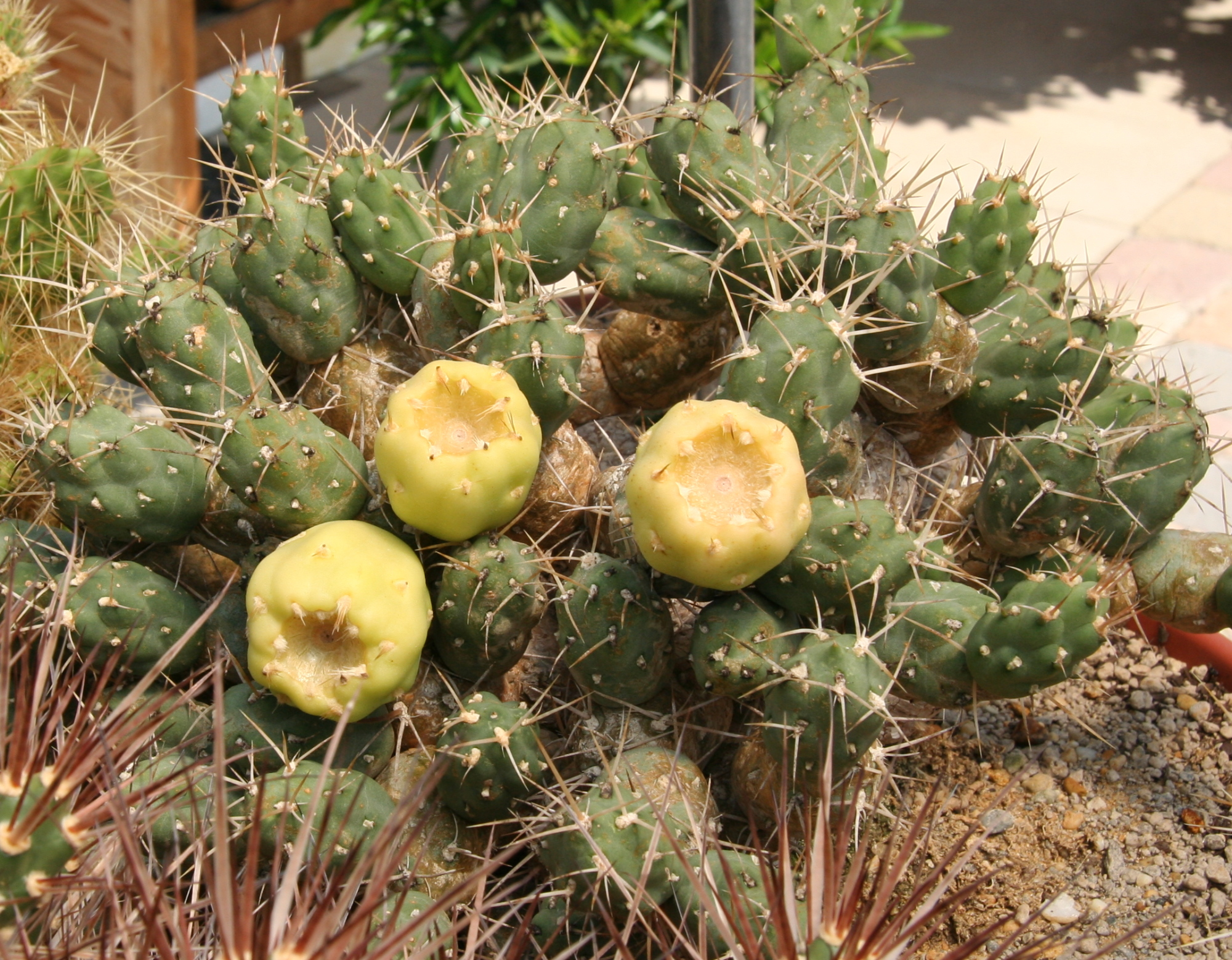
Plant with fruits
