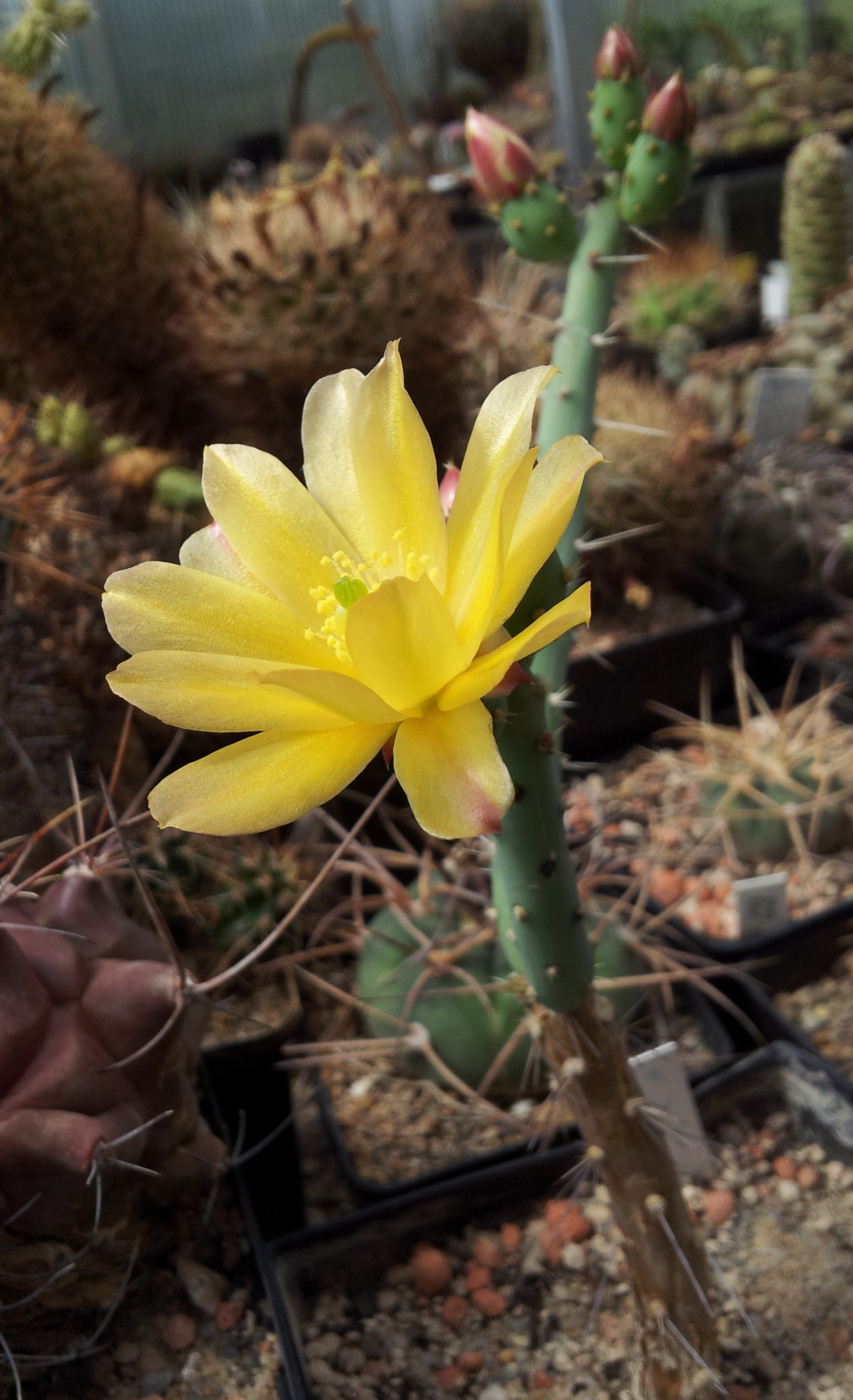
- Salmonopuntia salmiana

Scientific classification
- Kingdom: Plantae
- Clade: Tracheophytes
- Clade: Angiosperms
- Clade: Eudicots
- Order: Caryophyllales
- Family: Cactaceae
- Subfamily: Opuntioideae
- Tribe: Opuntieae
- Genus: Salmonopuntia; P.V.Heath 1999

Type species
- Salmiopuntia salmiana

Species
- See Text

= Salmonopuntia =

Genus of cacti

Salmonopuntia is a South American genus of the cactus family (Cactaceae).

== Species ==
Species of the genus Salmonopuntia according to Plants of the World Online As of January 2023:

| Image | Scientific name | Distribution |
|---|---|---|
| | Salmonopuntia salmiana (J.Parm. ex Pfeiff.) P.V.Heath | Argentina, Bolivia, Paraguay |
| | Salmonopuntia schickendantzii (F.A.C.Weber) Font & M.Köhler | Argentina, Bolivia, Paraguay |
