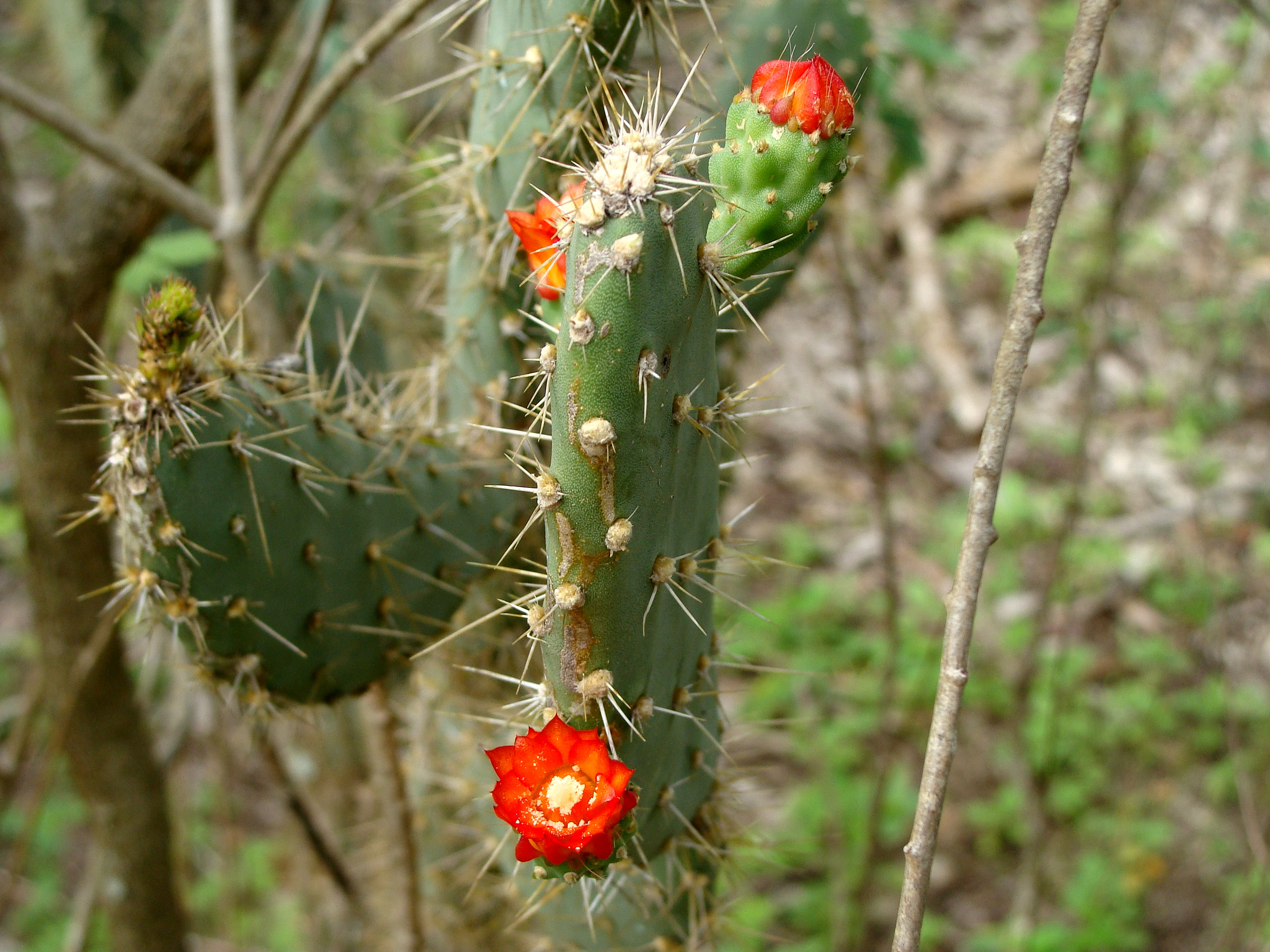

Conservation status
- Least Concern (IUCN 3.1)

Scientific classification
- Kingdom: Plantae
- Clade: Tracheophytes
- Clade: Angiosperms
- Clade: Eudicots
- Order: Caryophyllales
- Family: Cactaceae
- Genus: Tacinga
- Species: T. palmadora

Binomial name
- Tacinga palmadora (Britton & Rose) N.P.Taylor & Stuppy

= Tacinga palmadora =

Species of cactus

Tacinga palmadora is a species of plant in the family Cactaceae.

== Distribution and habitat ==
T. palmadora is endemic to Brazil. Its natural habitats are subtropical or tropical dry forests and subtropical or tropical dry shrubland. It is threatened by habitat loss.
