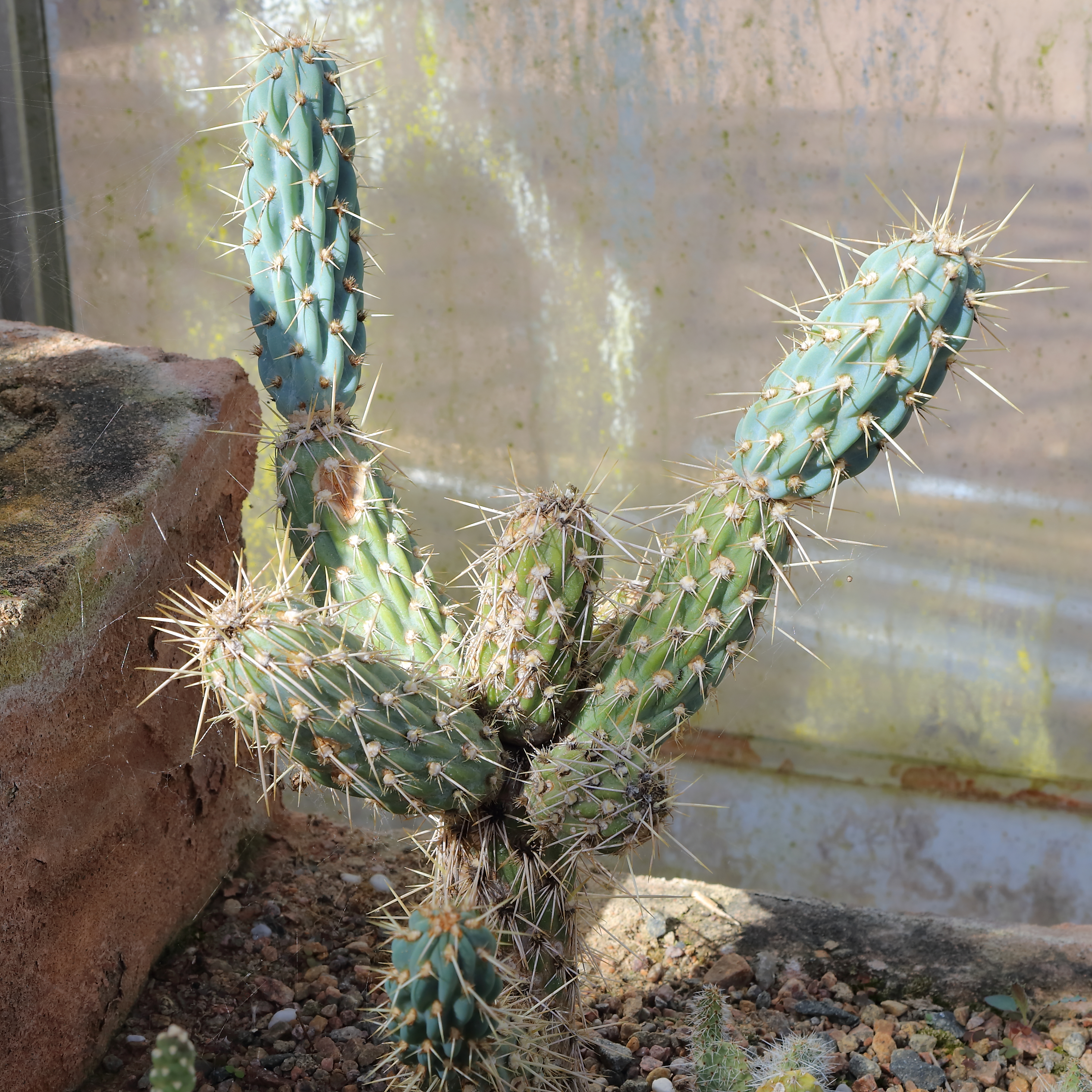
- Miqueliopuntia miquelii

Conservation status
- Least Concern (IUCN 3.1)

Scientific classification
- Kingdom: Plantae
- Clade: Tracheophytes
- Clade: Angiosperms
- Clade: Eudicots
- Order: Caryophyllales
- Family: Cactaceae
- Subfamily: Opuntioideae
- Tribe: Opuntieae
- Genus: Miqueliopuntia; Fric ex F.Ritter
- Species: M. miquelii

Binomial name
- Miqueliopuntia miquelii (Monv.) F.Ritter

Synonyms
- Austrocylindropuntia miquelii (Monv.) Backeb., Cactaceae (Berlin) 1941(2): 13 (1942); Cylindropuntia miquelii (Monv.) Backeb. (Nye kaktusbog: 131 (1930); Opuntia miquelii Monv., Hort. Universel 1: 218 (1839); Austrocylindropuntia miquelii var. jilesii Backeb., Descr. Cact. Nov. 1: 6 (1956 publ. 1957); Miqueliopuntia miquelii f. flava P.V.Heath, Calyx 6: 41 (1999); Opuntia geissei Phil., Anales Univ. Chile 85: 492 (1894); Opuntia miquelii var. jilesii (Backeb.) G.D.Rowley, Natl. Cact. Succ. J. 13: 4 (1958); Opuntia pulverulenta Pfeiff., Allg. Gartenzeitung 8: 407 (1840); Opuntia rosiflora K.Schum., Gesamtbeschr. Kakt.: 686 (1898)

= Miqueliopuntia =

Genus of cacti

Miqueliopuntia is a monotypic genus of cactus in the Cactaceae family, containing a single species, Miqueliopuntia miquelii (Monv.) F.Ritter., which is native to the Chilean coasts of South America.

Both genus and species were published in Kakteen Südamerika vol.3 on page 869 in 1980.

The genus name of Miqueliopuntia is in honour of Friedrich Anton Wilhelm Miquel (1811–1871), who was a Dutch botanist, whose main focus of study was on the flora of the Dutch East Indies.
