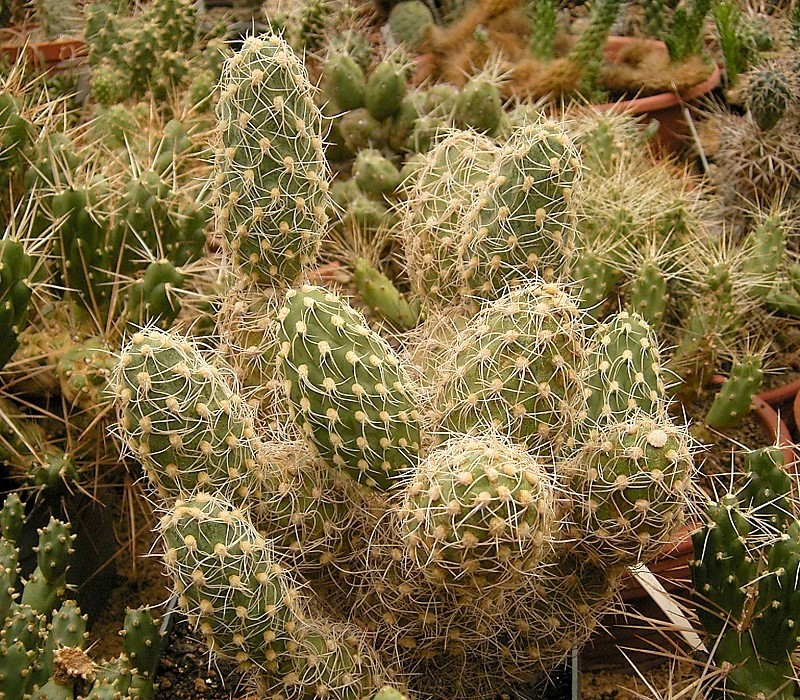
- Cumulopuntia sphaerica

Scientific classification
- Kingdom: Plantae
- Clade: Tracheophytes
- Clade: Angiosperms
- Clade: Eudicots
- Order: Caryophyllales
- Family: Cactaceae
- Subfamily: Opuntioideae
- Tribe: Tephrocacteae
- Genus: Cumulopuntia; F.Ritter 1980.

Type species
- Cumulopuntia ignescens

Synonyms
- Sphaeropuntia Guiggi 2012.

= Cumulopuntia =

Genus of cacti

Cumulopuntia is a genus of cactus (family Cactaceae). This is a poorly defined genus, with constant change to what species fall under it and whether it should even be a separate genus from Opuntia, which it is often interchanged with. It was defined by Friedrich Ritter in 1980 by redefining multiple species in Tephrocactus and Opuntia. Still more work needs to be done to circumscribe Cumulopuntia as it stands.

== Species list ==
As of September 2026, Plants of the World Online accepted the following species:

Image	Scientific name	Distribution
	Cumulopuntia berteroi (Colla) F.Ritter	C Chile
	Cumulopuntia chichensis (Cárdenas) E.F.Anderson	Argentina, Bolivia
	Cumulopuntia corotilla (K.Schum. ex Vaupel) E.F.Anderson	Peru
	Cumulopuntia dactylifera (Vaupel) E.F.Anderson	Peru, Bolivia
	Cumulopuntia dimorpha (C.F.Först.) A.Pauca & Quip.	Peru.
	Cumulopuntia echinacea (F.Ritter) F.Ritter	N Chile
	Cumulopuntia flexibilispina Hoxey & M.Lowry	Bolivia
	Cumulopuntia ignescens (Vaupel) F.Ritter	Peru, Bolivia, N Chile
	Cumulopuntia iturbicola G.J.Charles	Argentina (Jujuy)
	Cumulopuntia leucophaea (Phil.) Hoxey	Chile, Peru
	Cumulopuntia mollispina Hoxey, A.Pauca, Quip. & Gdaniec	Peru
	Cumulopuntia rossiana (Heinrich & Backeb.) F.Ritter	Argentina, Bolivia, Peru
	Cumulopuntia pentlandii (Salm-Dyck) F.Ritter	NW Argentina, Bolivia, N Chile, Peru
	Cumulopuntia sphaerica (C.F.Först.) E.F.Anderson	W and S Peru
	Cumulopuntia subterranea (R.E.Fr.) F.Ritter	Argentina, Bolivia
	Cumulopuntia unguispina (Backeb.) F.Ritter ex A.Pauca & Quip.	Peru
	Cumulopuntia zehnderi (Rauh & Backeb.) F.Ritter	Peru
