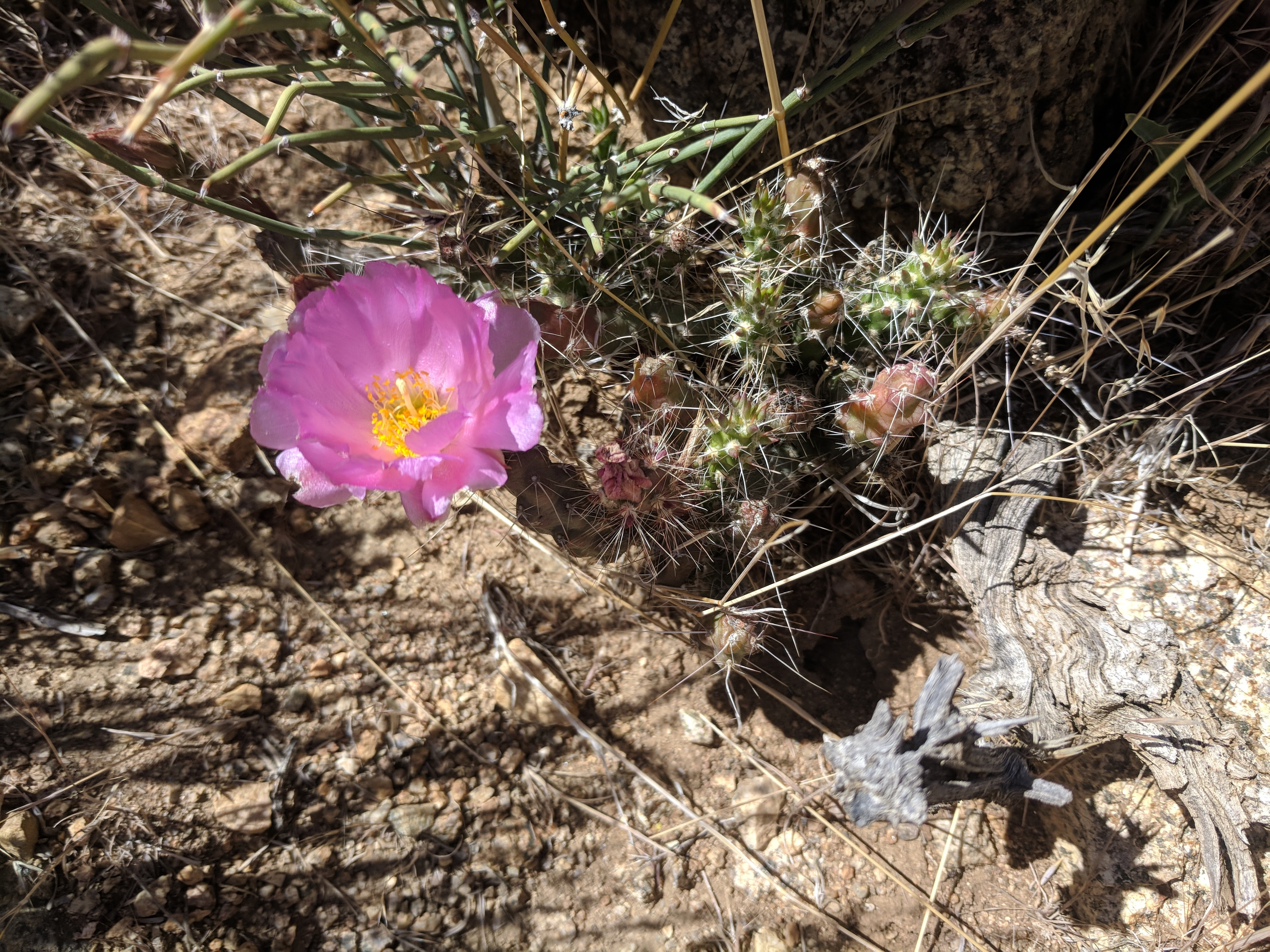

Conservation status
- Vulnerable (NatureServe)

Scientific classification
- Kingdom: Plantae
- Clade: Embryophytes
- Clade: Tracheophytes
- Clade: Spermatophytes
- Clade: Angiosperms
- Clade: Eudicots
- Order: Caryophyllales
- Family: Cactaceae
- Genus: Micropuntia; Daston
- Species: M. pulchella

Binomial name
- Micropuntia pulchella (Engelm.) M.P.Griff.

Synonyms
- List: Corynopuntia pulchella (Engelm.) F.M.Knuth; Grusonia pulchella (Engelm.) H.Rob.; Micropuntia barkleyana Daston; Micropuntia brachyrhopalica Daston; Micropuntia gracilicylindrica E.F.Wiegand & Backeb.; Micropuntia pulchella subsp. gracilicylindrica (E.F.Wiegand & Backeb.) Hochstätter; Micropuntia pygmaea E.F.Wiegand & Backeb.; Micropuntia spectatissima Daston; Micropuntia tuberculosirhopalica E.F.Wiegand & Backeb.; Micropuntia wiegandii Backeb.; Opuntia barkleyana (Daston) G.D.Rowley; Opuntia brachyrhopalica (Daston) G.D.Rowley; Opuntia gracilicylindrica (E.F.Wiegand & Backeb.) G.D.Rowley; Opuntia pulchella Engelm.; Opuntia pygmaea (E.F.Wiegand & Backeb.) G.D.Rowley; Opuntia spectatissima (Daston) G.D.Rowley; Opuntia tuberculosirhopalica (E.F.Wiegand & Backeb.) G.D.Rowley; Opuntia wiegandii (Backeb.) G.D.Rowley

= Micropuntia =

Species of cactus

Micropuntia is a monotypic genus of cactus. Its only species is Micropuntia pulchella, synonym Grusonia pulchella. The species is also known as sagebrush cholla. It is a tuberous species of opuntioid cactus from the Great Basin Desert of central Nevada, eastern California and western Utah in the United States.

== Description ==
Micropuntia pulchella differs from other North American opuntioid cacti in having a geophytic habit, where above-ground growth dies back to the crown in adverse conditions, and resprouts under more favorable conditions. Authors have described the underground storage structure as a "tuberous root" or true tuber. The above-ground stems are variable, being cylindrical to globular. The areoles bear flexible yellow spines and white wool. Overall, the above-ground growth can often form a cushion-plant habit. The flowers are bright magenta, and the fruits are dehiscent. The seeds are unique, with a groove running along the hilar surface.

== Taxonomy ==
The genus Micropuntia was described by J.S. Daston in 1947. When Daston created the genus it was with three species that are considered heterotypic synonyms of the species Micropuntia pulchella. The species Micropuntia pulchella was scientifically described by George Engelmann in 1863 as Opuntia pulchella. It was moved to Micropuntia by M.Patrick Griffith in a paper published in 2003.

== Range and habitat ==
Sagebrush cholla is native to three western US states, California, Nevada, and Utah.

Micropuntia pulchella grows in gravelly alluvial fans, often above salt flats or alkali basins. Specimens can be locally common, although they are difficult to locate, often growing under other shrubs such as shadscale.
