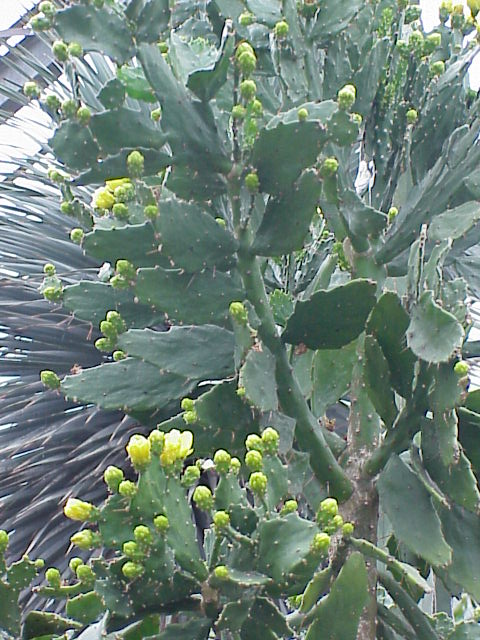

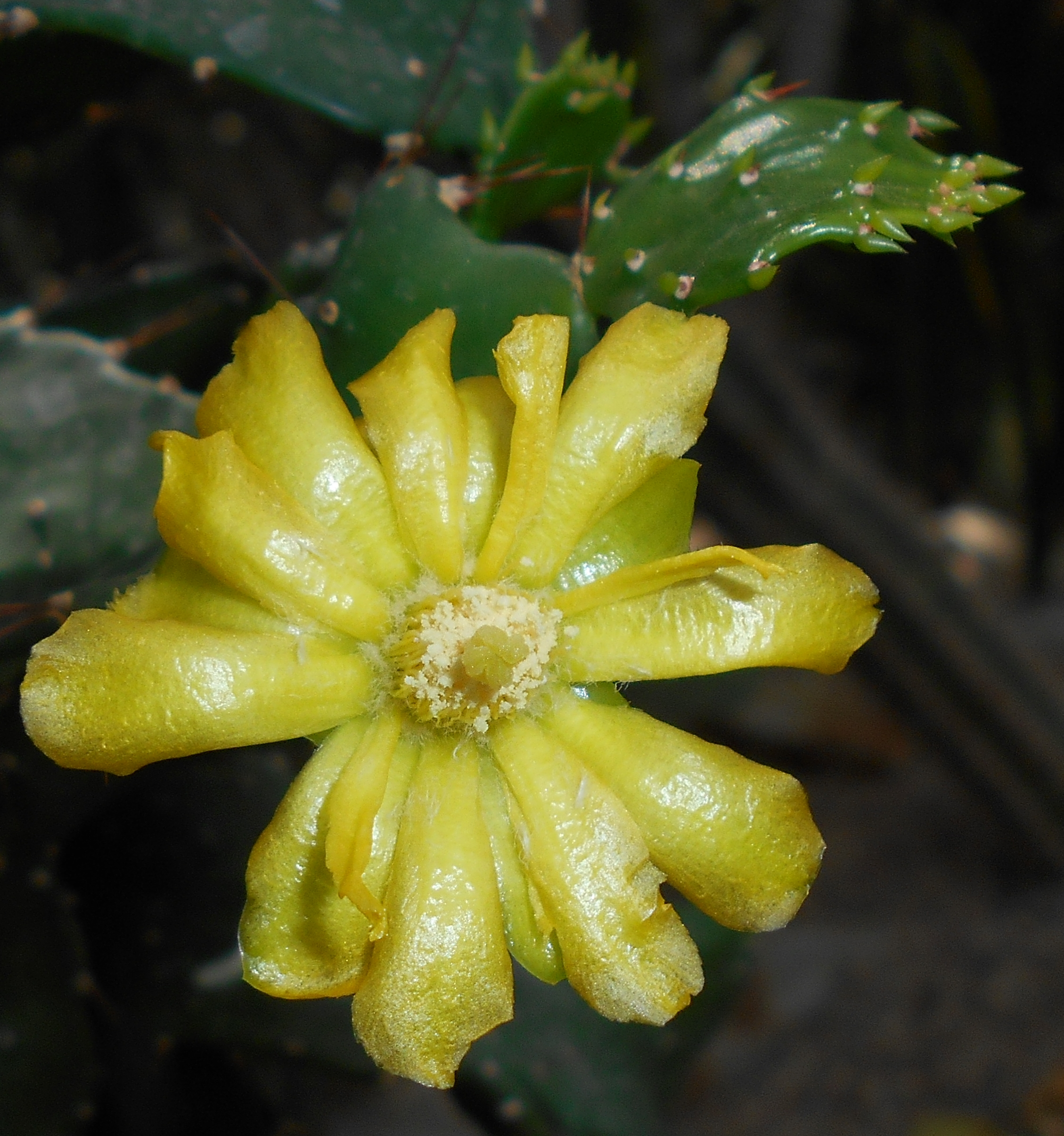

Conservation status
- Least Concern (IUCN 3.1)

Scientific classification
- Kingdom: Plantae
- Clade: Tracheophytes
- Clade: Angiosperms
- Clade: Eudicots
- Order: Caryophyllales
- Family: Cactaceae
- Subfamily: Opuntioideae
- Tribe: Opuntieae
- Genus: Brasiliopuntia (K.Schum.) A.Berger
- Species: B. brasiliensis

Binomial name
- Brasiliopuntia brasiliensis (Willd.) A.Berger

Synonyms
- Cactus brasiliensis Willd.

= Brasiliopuntia =

Genus of plants

Brasiliopuntia is a genus in the cactus family, Cactaceae. It contains only one species, Brasiliopuntia brasiliensis.

== Description ==
Brasiliopuntia brasiliensis shows thin, upright, tree-like, slightly shrunken cladodes on a central, cylindrical trunk reaches a height of 20 meters (or more); the tallest member of the Opuntia subfamily. The intermediate segments are cylindrical and 20 to 100 centimeters long. The leaves are bright green. The light to dark green end segments are rhomboid to ovoid, of unequal shape, narrow at the base and produce leaf-like shoots or flax sprouts. The fleshy, light green leaves are small and soon fall off. The areoles have white hairs and later develop glochids. Its white areoles bear one or two small brown upright spines. The 1 to 3 spines, which may also be missing, are thin, reddish and up to 15 millimeters long. Its light brown flowers appear only on adult plants. The yellow flowers appear near the tip or terminally on the thin-fleshed segments or from the pericarpel of old flowers, open during the day and are up to 6 centimeters long. There are hair-like staminodes between the perianth and the stamens.

The spherical to pear-shaped to elongated, fleshy fruits are yellow, orange-red, red or purple, have a diameter of 3 to 4 centimeters and bear striking tufts of dark brown glochids. They contain 1 to 5, very large (6.5 to 10 millimeters), thick, disc-like, laterally compressed, woolly seeds.

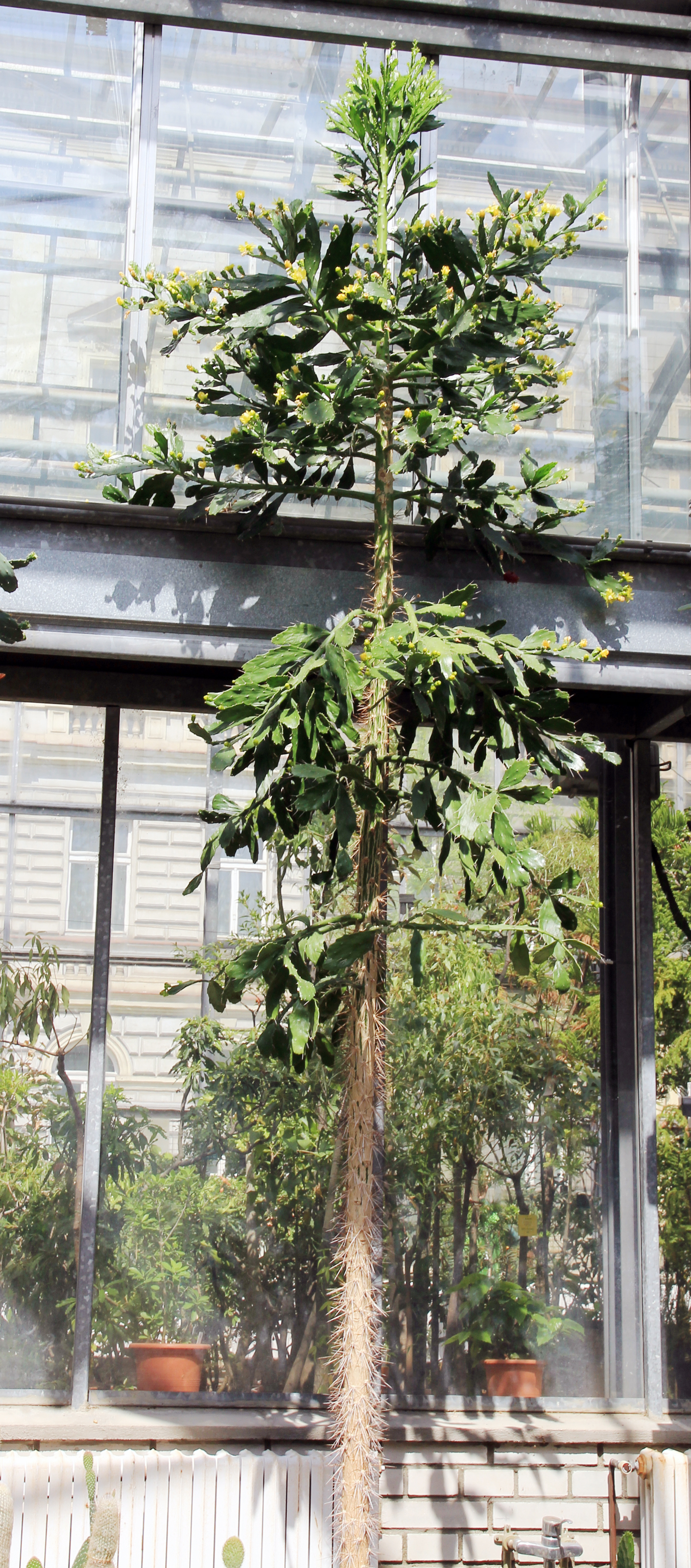
Brasiliopuntia brasiliensis

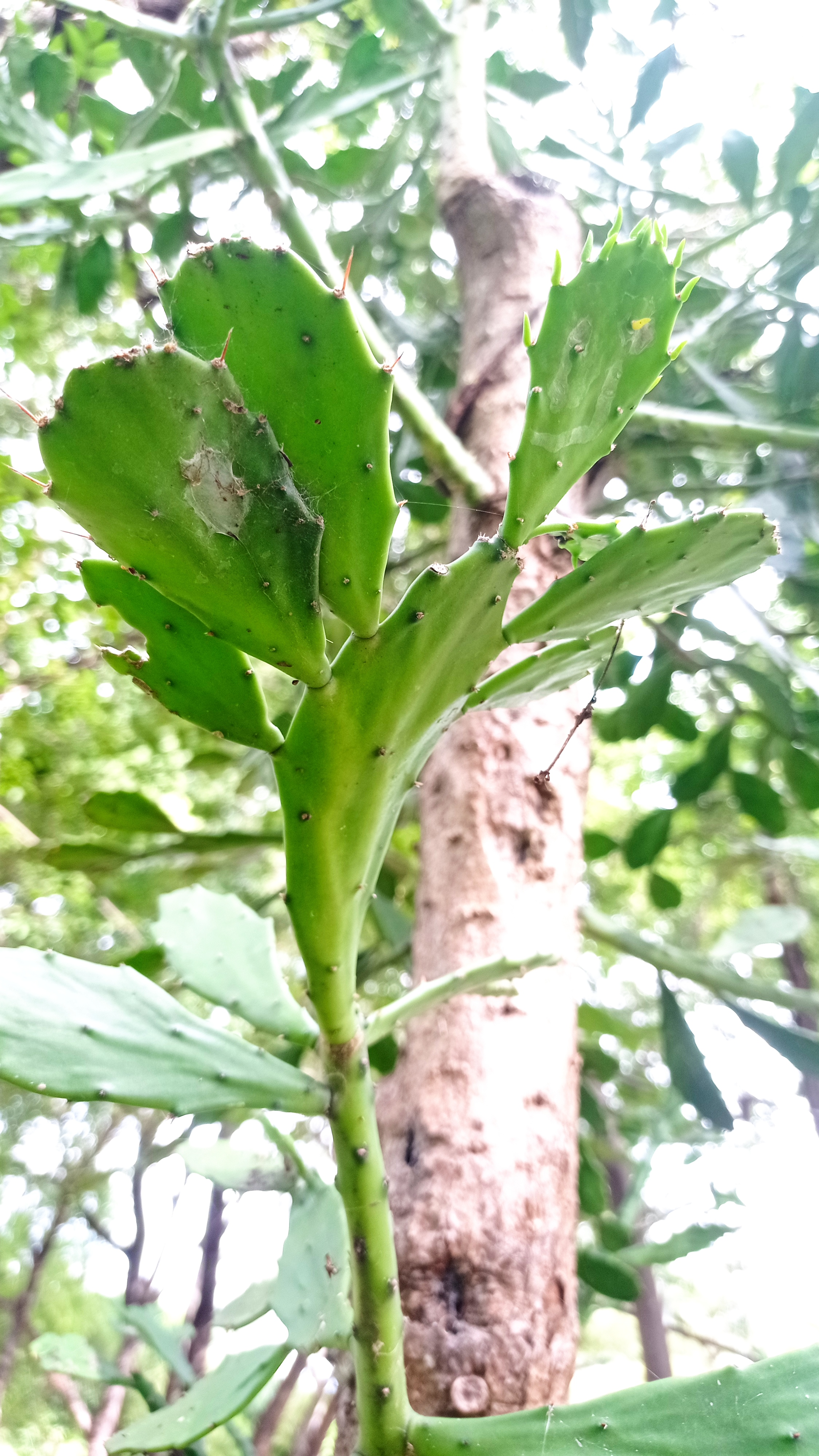
segments

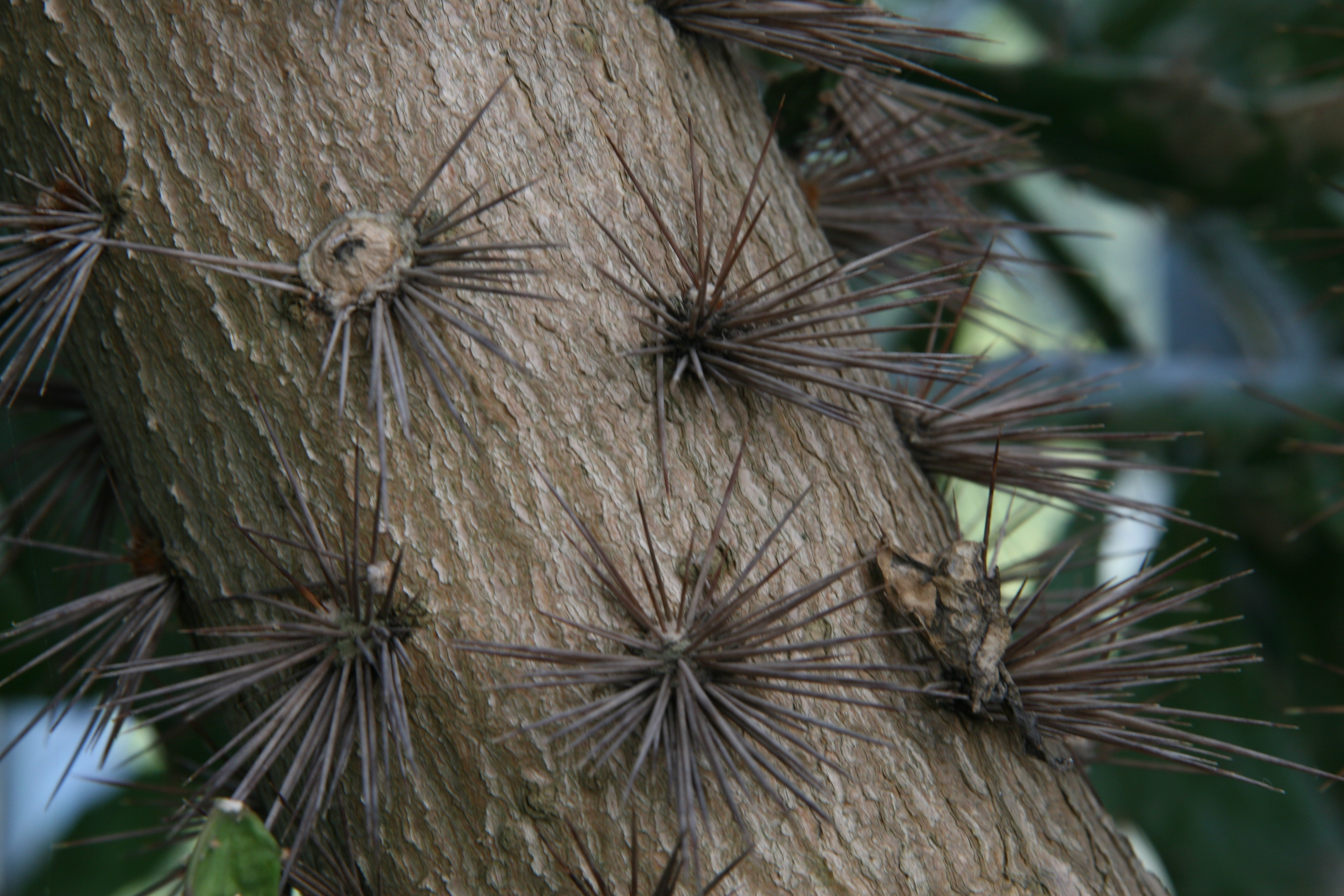
Trunk

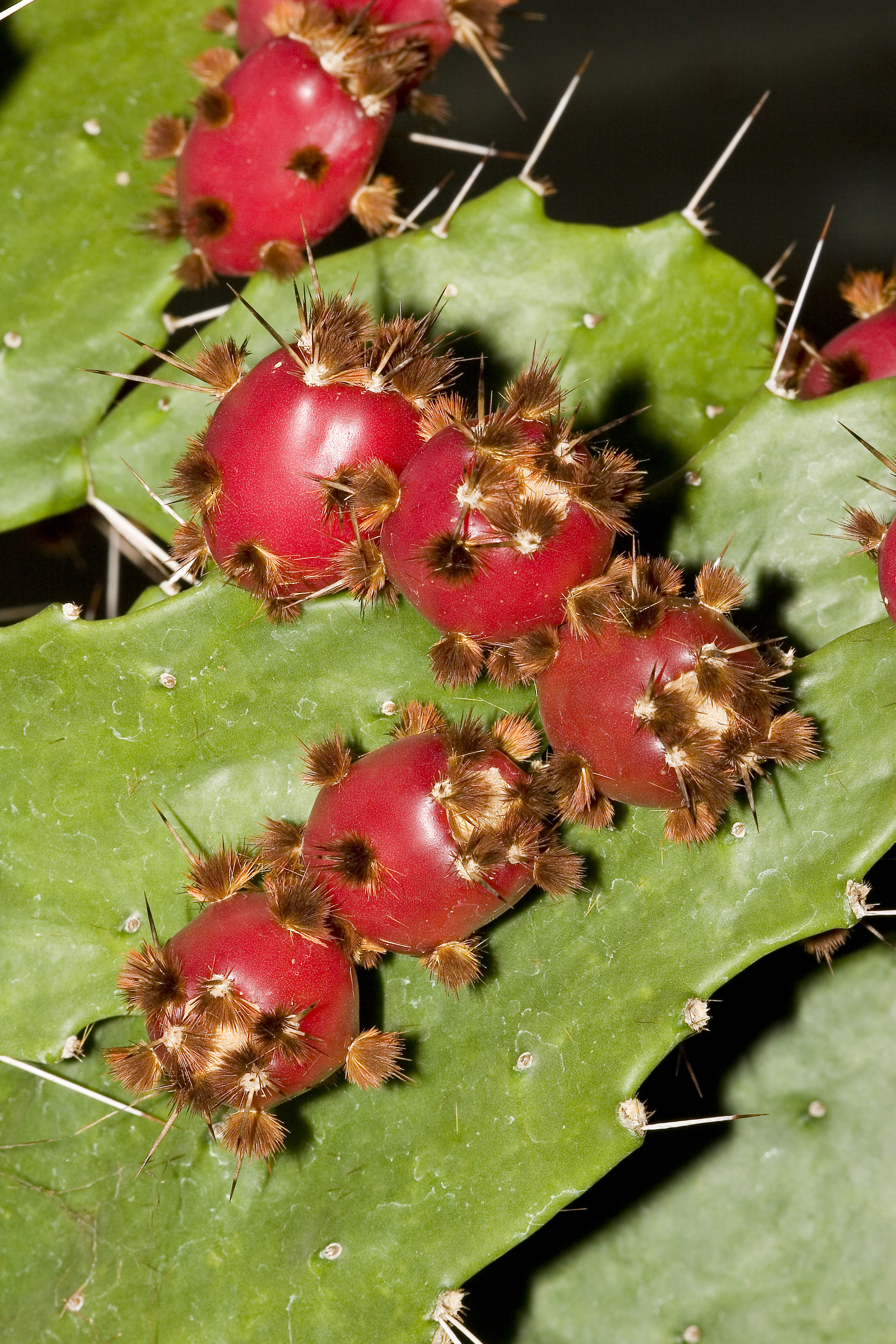
Fruits

== Distribution ==
It is found in Brazil, Paraguay, eastern Bolivia, Peru and northern Argentina, and has become naturalized in Florida among other places.

== Systematics ==
Karl Moritz Schumann described the genus in 1898 as a subgenus of Opuntia. Nathaniel Lord Britton and Joseph Nelson Rose already considered the possibility of an independent genre in 1919. Alwin Berger finally elevated the species to the status of an independent genus in 1926. Brasiliopuntia brasiliensis was placed in the genus Opuntia when the very broad genus Cactus was dismembered. The distinctive features of the species were recognized by Karl Schumann in 1898 when he created a subgenus Brasiliopuntia within the genus Opuntia. In 1926 Alwin Berger completed the separation from Opuntia by raising Brasiliopuntia to a full genus. The first description as Cactus brasiliensis was in 1814 by Carl Ludwig Willdenow. A number of species have been described in the past, but are now considered only to be variants of B. brasiliensis.

=== Species list ===
- Brasiliopuntia brasiliensis (Willdenow) A. Berger

Synonyms:

- Cactus brasiliensis Willdenow
- Opuntia brasiliensis (Willdenow) Haworth
- Opuntia bahiensis Britton & Rose
- Brasilopuntia bahiensis (Britton & Rose) A. Berger
- Opuntia schulzii A. Castellanos & Lelong
- Brasilopuntia neoargentina Backeberg
- Brasilopuntia schulzii (A. Castellanos & Lelong) Backeberg
- Brasilopuntia subcarpa Rizzini & A. Mattos

== Bibliography ==
- Innes C, Wall B (1995). Cacti Succulents and Bromaliads. Cassell & The Royal Horticultural Society.
