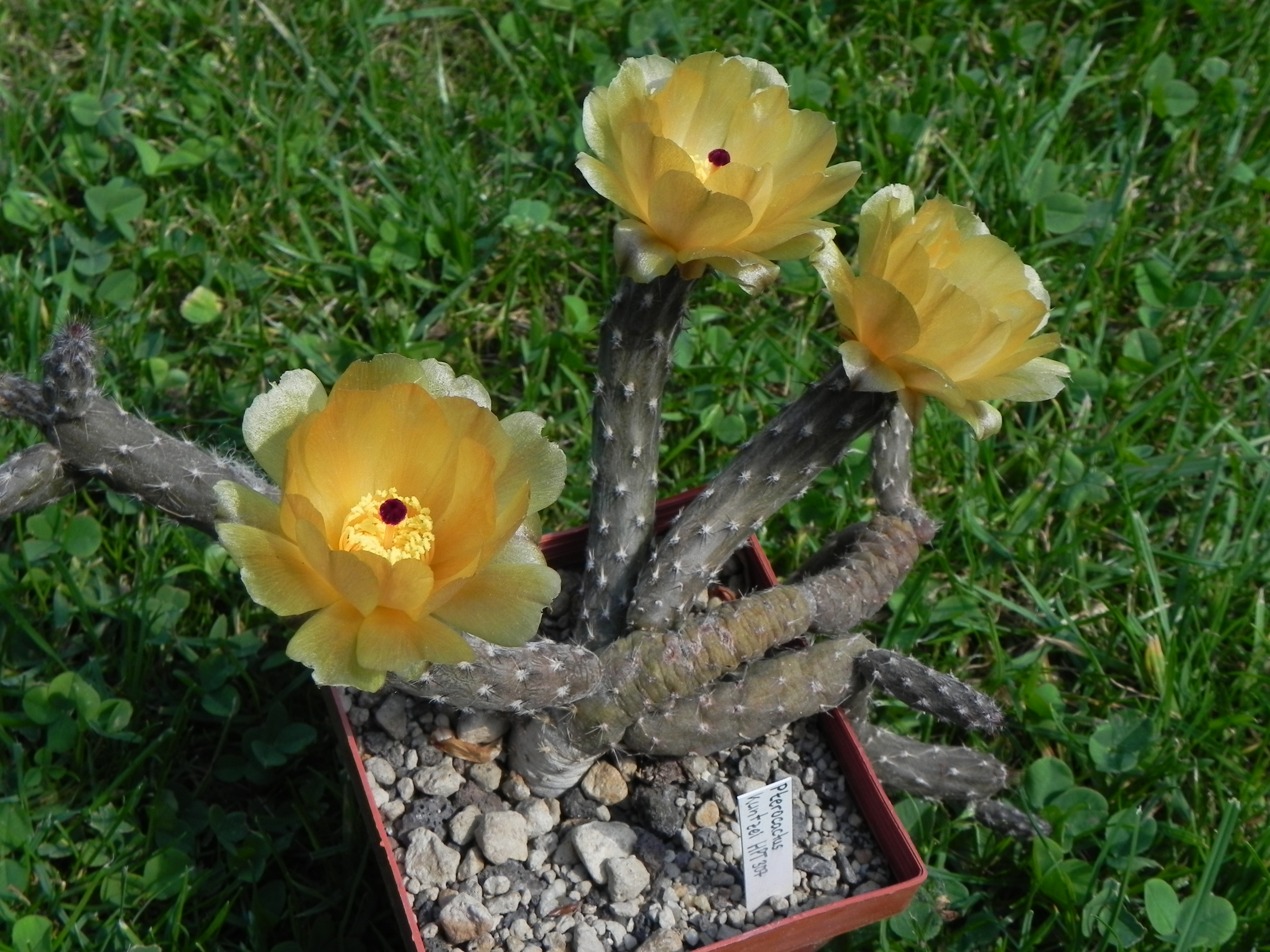
- In bloom

Scientific classification
- Kingdom: Plantae
- Clade: Embryophytes
- Clade: Tracheophytes
- Clade: Angiosperms
- Clade: Eudicots
- Order: Caryophyllales
- Family: Cactaceae
- Genus: Pterocactus
- Species: P. tuberosus

Binomial name
- Pterocactus tuberosus (Pfeiff.) Britton & Rose

Synonyms
- Opuntia kuntzei (K.Schum.) Kiessling; Opuntia tuberosa Pfeiff.; Opuntia tuberosa var. spinosa Pfeiff.; Pterocactus kuntzei K.Schum.; Pterocactus tuberosus f. lelongii (Ruíz Leal ex R.Kiesling) R.Kiesling

= Pterocactus tuberosus =

Species of cactus

Pterocactus tuberosus is a species of cactus in the genus Pterocactus, native to Argentina. It has gained the Royal Horticultural Society's Award of Garden Merit.
