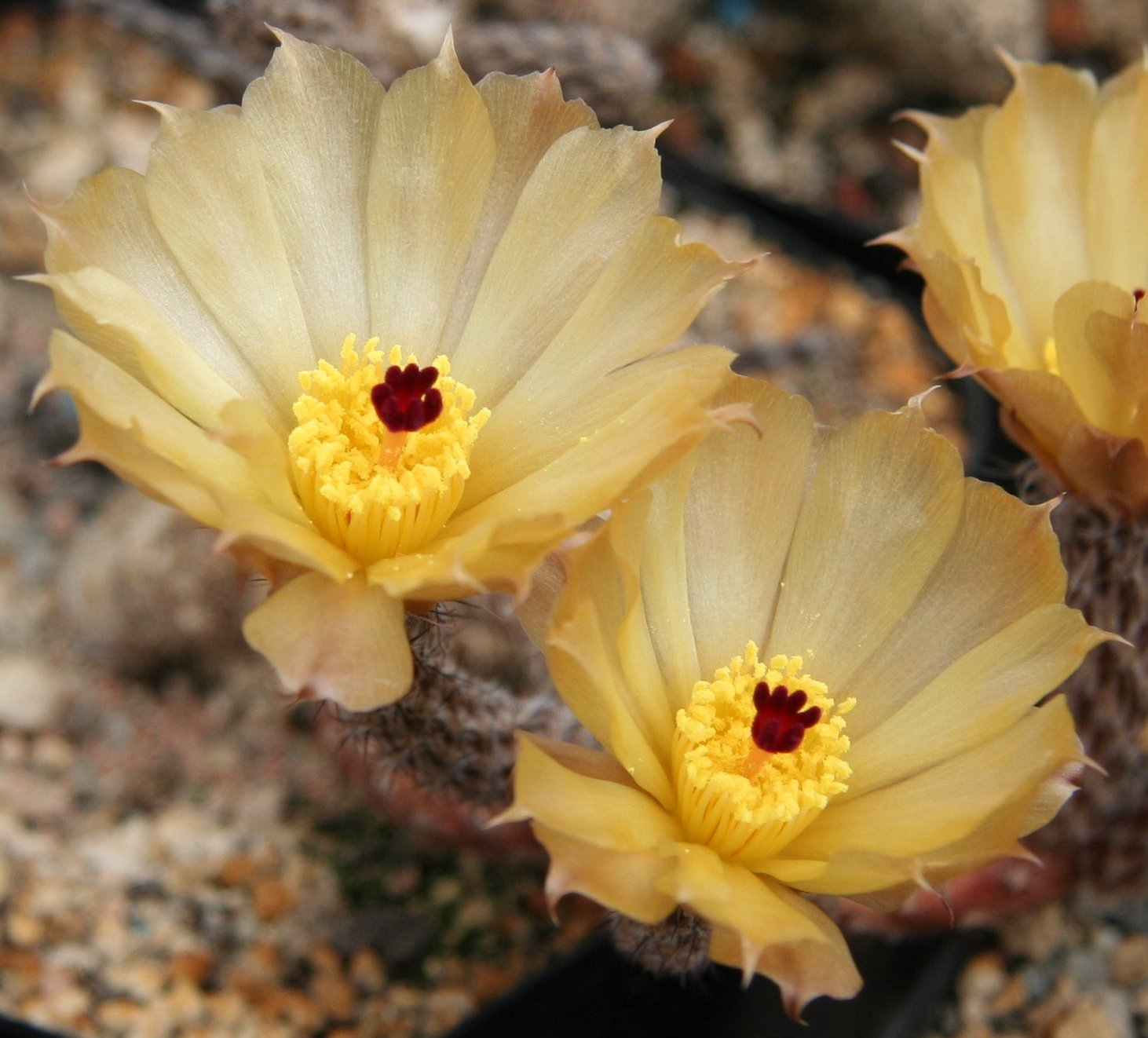
- Pterocactus tuberosus

Scientific classification
- Kingdom: Plantae
- Clade: Tracheophytes
- Clade: Angiosperms
- Clade: Eudicots
- Order: Caryophyllales
- Family: Cactaceae
- Subfamily: Opuntioideae
- Tribe: Tephrocacteae
- Genus: Pterocactus; K.Schum.

Type species
- Pterocactus kuntzei

Species
- See text

= Pterocactus =

Genus of cacti

Pterocactus (from Greek pteron, "wing", referring to the saucer-shaped seed of these plants) is a genus of the cactus family (Cactaceae), comprising 9 species. All Pterocactus have tuberous roots and are endemic to South and Western Argentina. The genus has been given its own tribe, the Pterocacteae. A molecular phylogenetic analysis placed the genus in the tribe Tephrocacteae.

== Species ==
Species of the genus Pterocactus accepted by Plants of the World Online as of September 2026:

Image	Scientific name	Distribution
	Pterocactus araucanus Castell.	Argentina
	Pterocactus australis (F.A.C.Weber) Backeb.	Argentina, Chile
	Pterocactus fischeri Britton & Rose	Argentina
	Pterocactus fragilis R.Kiesling, E.Sarnes & N.Sarnes	Argentina (Neuquén)
	Pterocactus gonjianii R.Kiesling	Argentina (San Juan).
	Pterocactus hickenii Britton & Rose	Argentina, Chile
	Pterocactus megliolii R.Kiesling	Argentina (San Juan)
	Pterocactus neuquensis R.Kiesling, E.Sarnes & N.Sarnes	Argentina (Neuquén)
	Pterocactus reticulatus R.Kiesling	Argentina (San Juan, Mendoza)
	Pterocactus tuberosus (Pfeiff.) Britton & Rose	Argentina
	Pterocactus valentini Speg.	Argentina
