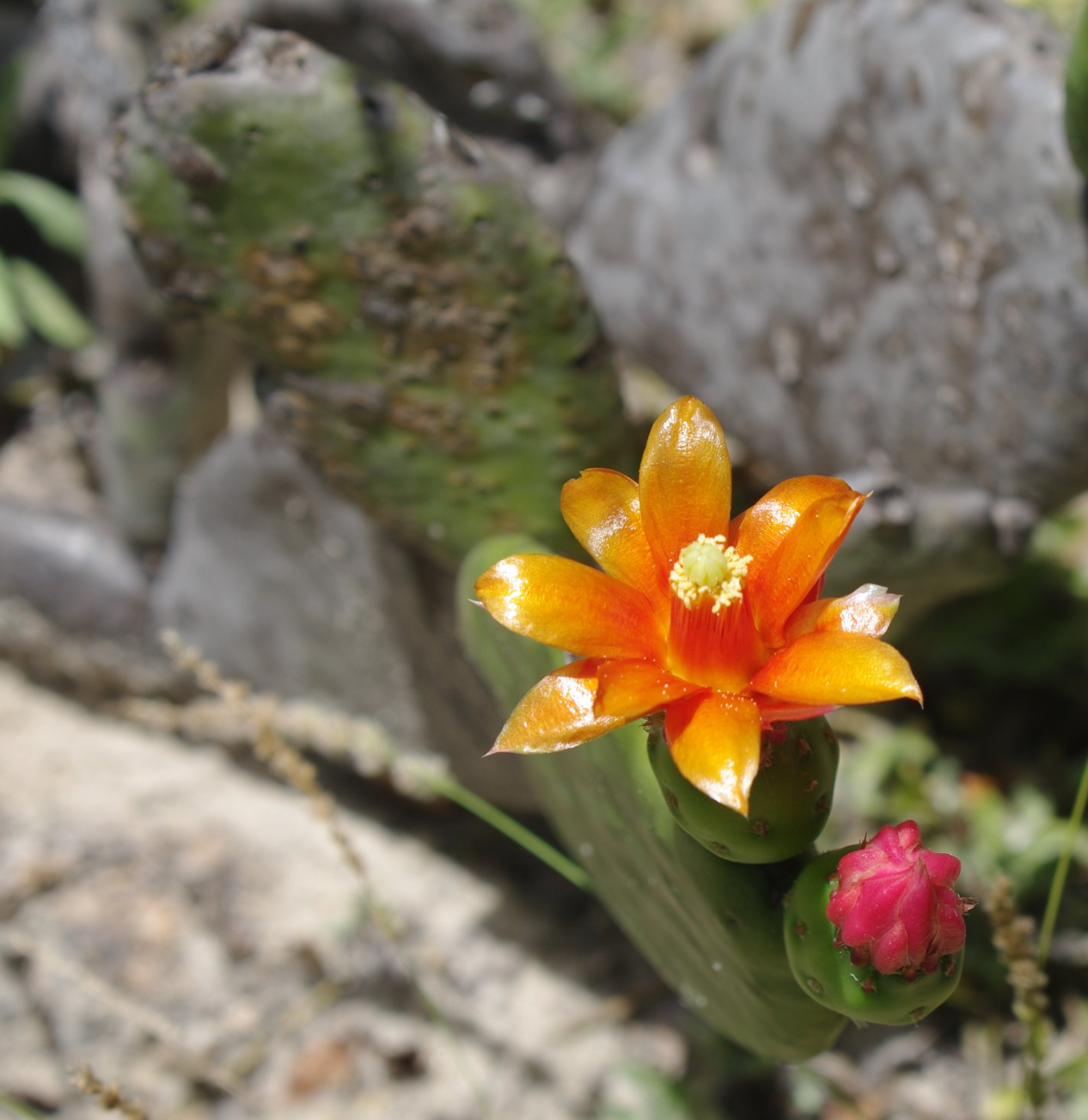
- Tacinga inamonena cv. "Marlons Dwarf"

Conservation status
- Least Concern (IUCN 3.1)

Scientific classification
- Kingdom: Plantae
- Clade: Tracheophytes
- Clade: Angiosperms
- Clade: Eudicots
- Order: Caryophyllales
- Family: Cactaceae
- Genus: Tacinga
- Species: T. inamoena

Binomial name
- Tacinga inamoena (K.Schumann) N.P.Taylor & Stuppy

= Tacinga inamoena =

Species of cactus

Tacinga inamoena is a species of plant in the family Cactaceae.

== Distribution and habitat ==
T. inamoena is endemic to Brazil. Its natural habitats are subtropical or tropical dry forests, subtropical or tropical dry shrubland, and rocky areas. It is threatened by habitat loss.
