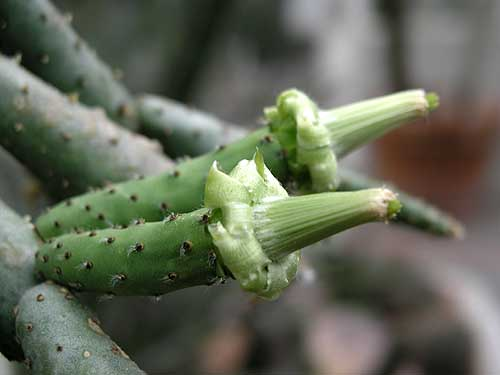
- Tacinga funalis

Scientific classification
- Kingdom: Plantae
- Clade: Tracheophytes
- Clade: Angiosperms
- Clade: Eudicots
- Order: Caryophyllales
- Family: Cactaceae
- Subfamily: Opuntioideae
- Tribe: Opuntieae
- Genus: Tacinga; Britton & Rose

Species
- See text

= Tacinga =

Genus of cacti

Tacinga is a genus in the cactus family Cactaceae, native to northeast Brazil (from northeast Minas Gerais to southern Rio Grande do Norte, including Bahia, Sergipe, Alagoas, Pernambuco and Paraíba). Once thought to be monotypic, the genus now comprises 11 species and 4 hybrids.

== Species ==
As of September 2026, Plants of the World Online accepts these species:

Image	Scientific name	Distribution
	Tacinga armata J.G.Freitas & E.M.Almeida	Brazil
	Tacinga braunii Esteves	Eastern Brazil
	Tacinga funalis Britton & Rose	Brazil
	Tacinga gladispina J.G.Freitas & E.M.Almeida	Northeastern Brazil
	Tacinga inamoena (K.Schum.) N.P.Taylor & Stuppy	Brazil
	Tacinga lilae (Trujillo & Marisela Ponce) Majure & R.Puente	Northern Venezuela
	Tacinga mirim M.O.T Menezes	Brazil (Ceará)
	Tacinga palmadora(Britton & Rose) N.P.Taylor & Stuppy	Brazil
	Tacinga saxatilis (F.Ritter) N.P.Taylor & Stuppy	Central Brazil
	Tacinga subcylindrica (M.Machado & N.P.Taylor) M.Machado & N.P.Taylor	Northeastern Brazil
	Tacinga werneri (Eggli) N.P.Taylor & Stuppy	Brazil

== Natural Hybrids ==
Image	Scientific name	Distribution	Parentage
	Tacinga × catingicola (Werderm.) N.P.Taylor	W Bahia	Tacinga palmadora × Tacinga werneri
	Tacinga × flammea J.G.Freitas & E.M.Almeida	Bahia, Minas Gerais	Tacinga inamoena × Tacinga werneri
	Tacinga × grandiflora N.P.Taylor & Zappi	Bahia	Tacinga funalis × Tacinga inamoena
	Tacinga × quipa (F.A.C.Weber) N.P.Taylor & Stuppy	NE Brazil	Tacinga inamoena × Tacinga palmadora
