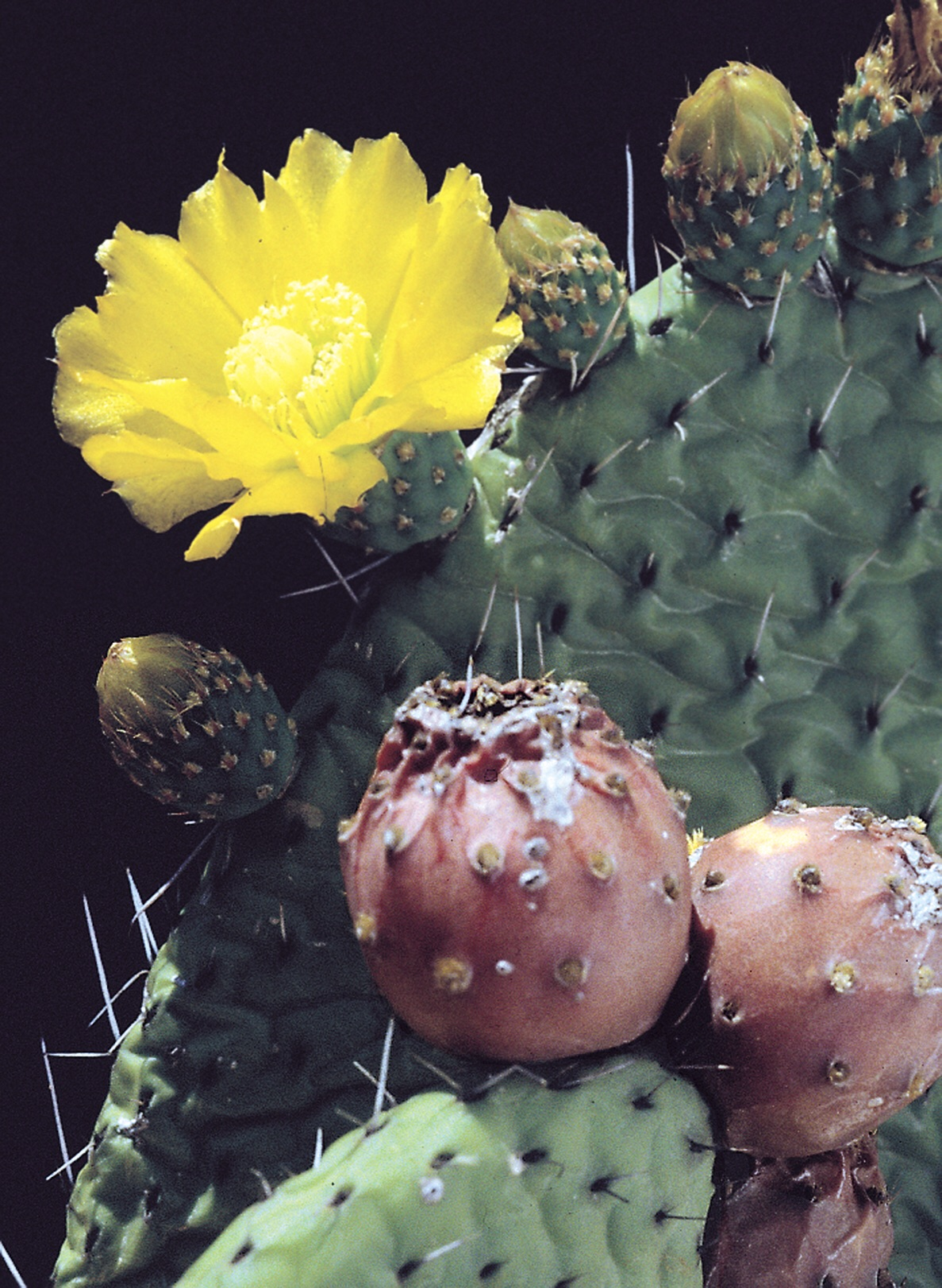

Conservation status
- Least Concern (IUCN 3.1)

Scientific classification
- Kingdom: Plantae
- Clade: Tracheophytes
- Clade: Angiosperms
- Clade: Eudicots
- Order: Caryophyllales
- Family: Cactaceae
- Genus: Tacinga
- Species: T. saxatilis

Binomial name
- Tacinga saxatilis (F.Ritter) N.P.Taylor & Stuppy

= Tacinga saxatilis =

Species of cactus

Tacinga saxatilis is a species of plant in the family Cactaceae. It is endemic to Brazil. Its natural habitats are subtropical or tropical dry forests, temperate shrubland, and rocky areas. It is threatened by habitat loss.
