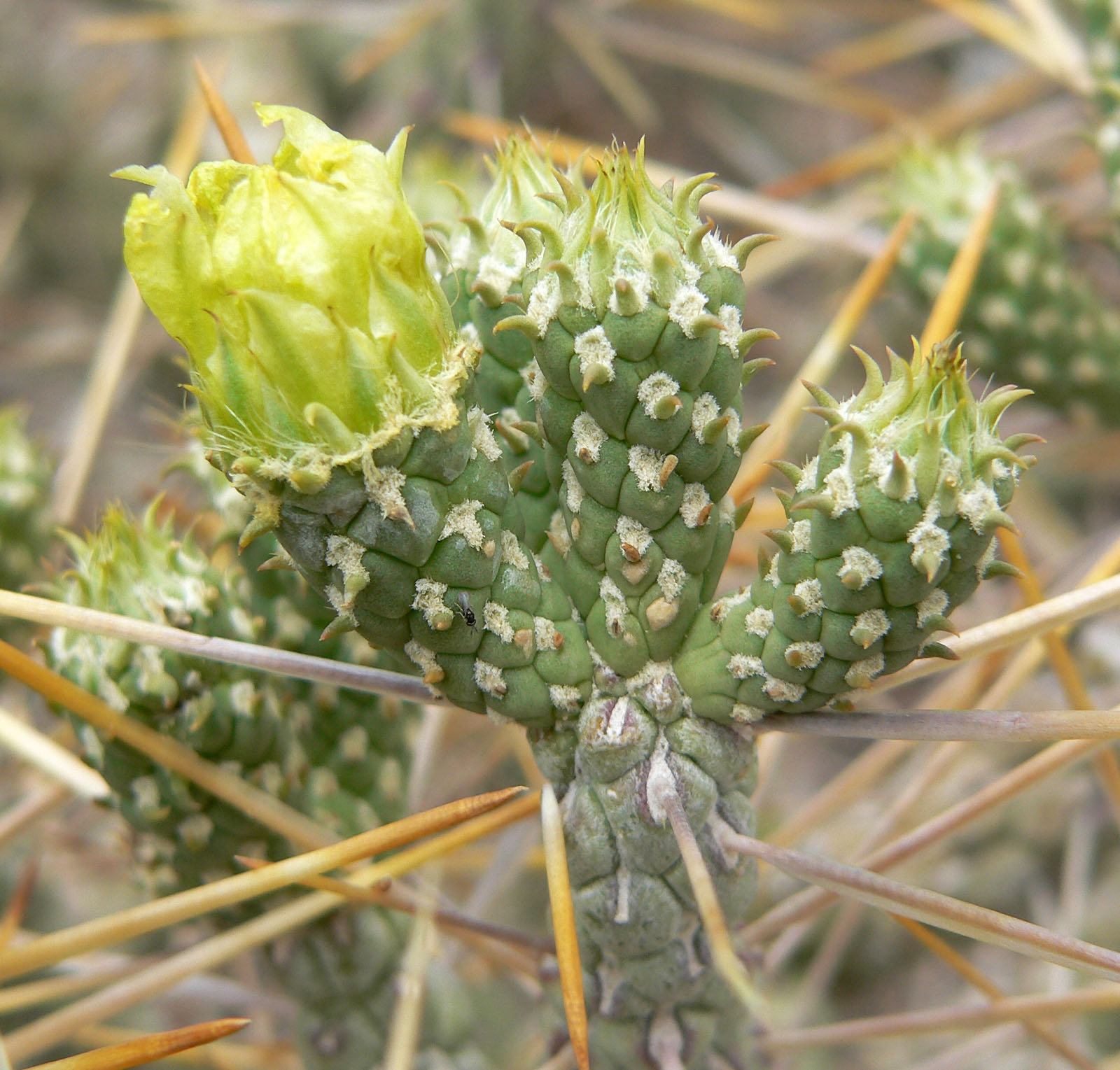
- Cylindropuntia ramosissima

Scientific classification
- Kingdom: Plantae
- Clade: Tracheophytes
- Clade: Angiosperms
- Clade: Eudicots
- Order: Caryophyllales
- Family: Cactaceae
- Subfamily: Opuntioideae; Burnett

Tribes
- Cylindropuntieae; Opuntieae; Tephrocacteae

= Opuntioideae =

Subfamily of cacti

Opuntioideae is a subfamily of the cactus family, Cactaceae. It contains 15 genera divided into five tribes. The subfamily encompasses roughly 220–250 species, and is geographically distributed throughout the New World from Canada, to Argentina. Members of this subfamily have diverse habits, including small geophytes, hemispherical cushions, shrubs, trees, and columnar cacti consisting of indeterminate branches or determinate terete or spherical segments.

== Description ==
Synapomorphies of Opuntioideae include small deciduous, barbed spines called glochids born on areoles and a bony aril surrounding a campylotropous ovule (inverted and curved, such that the micropyle almost meets the funiculus). Other prominent morphological characters for this subfamily are presence of cylindrical, caducous leaves that tend to be shed by maturity and the sectioning of the stem into joints or pads known as cladodes.

Opuntioideae are unique among cacti for lacking in the stem a thick cortex, an extensive system of cortical bundles, collapsible cortical cells, and medullary bundles. Typically, the epidermis consists of a single layer of irregularly shaped cells, a cuticle at least 1-2 microns thick, and long, uniseriate trichomes in the areoles. Opuntioideae have a hypodermis of at least one layer, very thick walls, and druses (aggregations of calcium oxalate crystals), and their cortical cells have enlarged nuclei; the reason for this is unknown. They also possess mucilage cells.

Notably, their lack of collapsible cortical cells, ribs, and tubercles mean that they cannot absorb water or transfer it intercellularly as easily as the other cacti, so this may place evolutionary constraints on the aridity of habitats and maximum adult size. One adaptation around this problem is the evolution of flattened cladodes that allow opuntioids to swell up with water, increasing in volume without an increase in surface area risking water loss. Opuntioids also lack fiber caps to their phloem bundles, which in other cacti protect against sucking insects and stiffen developing internodes.

== Taxonomy ==
A major challenge in Opuntioideae classification is that the subfamily is known to hybridize (particularly the Opuntieae tribe), which complicates identifying species. Genera exhibit variation in morphology, which makes using genetic analysis more important in determining relationships, since physical characteristics used to define genera may be unseen in some of them.

In 2009, a study by Griffith and Porter, based on ribosomal intergenic spacer analysis defined four clades within the Opuntioideae:

1. Core Maihueniopsis - which was shown as monophyletic through genetic analysis
2. Pterocactus - defined by a winged seed
3. Terete-stemmed - defined by cylinder-shaped stems
4. Flat-stemmed - defined by flat stems

They noted that the boundaries of some genera as then circumscribed were unclear.

Later research found different relationships based on what genetic sequences and analysis was used. In 2010, Nyffeler and Eggli, as part of a larger overhaul of Cactaceae systematics, proposed recognizing only Cylindropuntieae and Opuntieae as true tribes of Opuntioideae, since they were the tribes generally agreed to be monophyletic. All other genera would be placed in one polyphyletic basal group until further research produced more definitive answers to their phylogeny.

A 2020 study using chloroplast genome sequences found a much clearer division into three monophyletic tribes. Their maximum likelihood cladogram is shown below (the genus Punotia was not included in the study).

- - Outgroups
  - Opuntioideae
    - Opuntieae
      - Consolea
      - - - Brasiliopuntia
          - Tacinga
        - - Opuntia
          - - Miqueliopuntia
            - - Salmonopuntia
              - Airampoa (as Tunilla)
    - - Tephrocacteae
        - - Tephrocactus
          - Maihueniopsis
        - - Pterocactus
          - - Cumulopuntia
            - Austrocylindropuntia
      - Cylindropuntieae
        - Quiabentia
        - - Pereskiopsis
          - - Micropuntia
            - - Cylindropuntia
              - Grusonia

Other previously proposed tribes (Austrocylindropuntieae, Pterocacteae, and Pereskiopsideae) were found to be nested within these three tribes. Different relationships among the three tribes were found in other studies, so the authors of the 2020 study said that the relationship between the three tribes must be further investigated using other datasets.

=== Tribes and genera ===
The tribes and genera of the subfamily Opuntioideae as of January 2025 are:

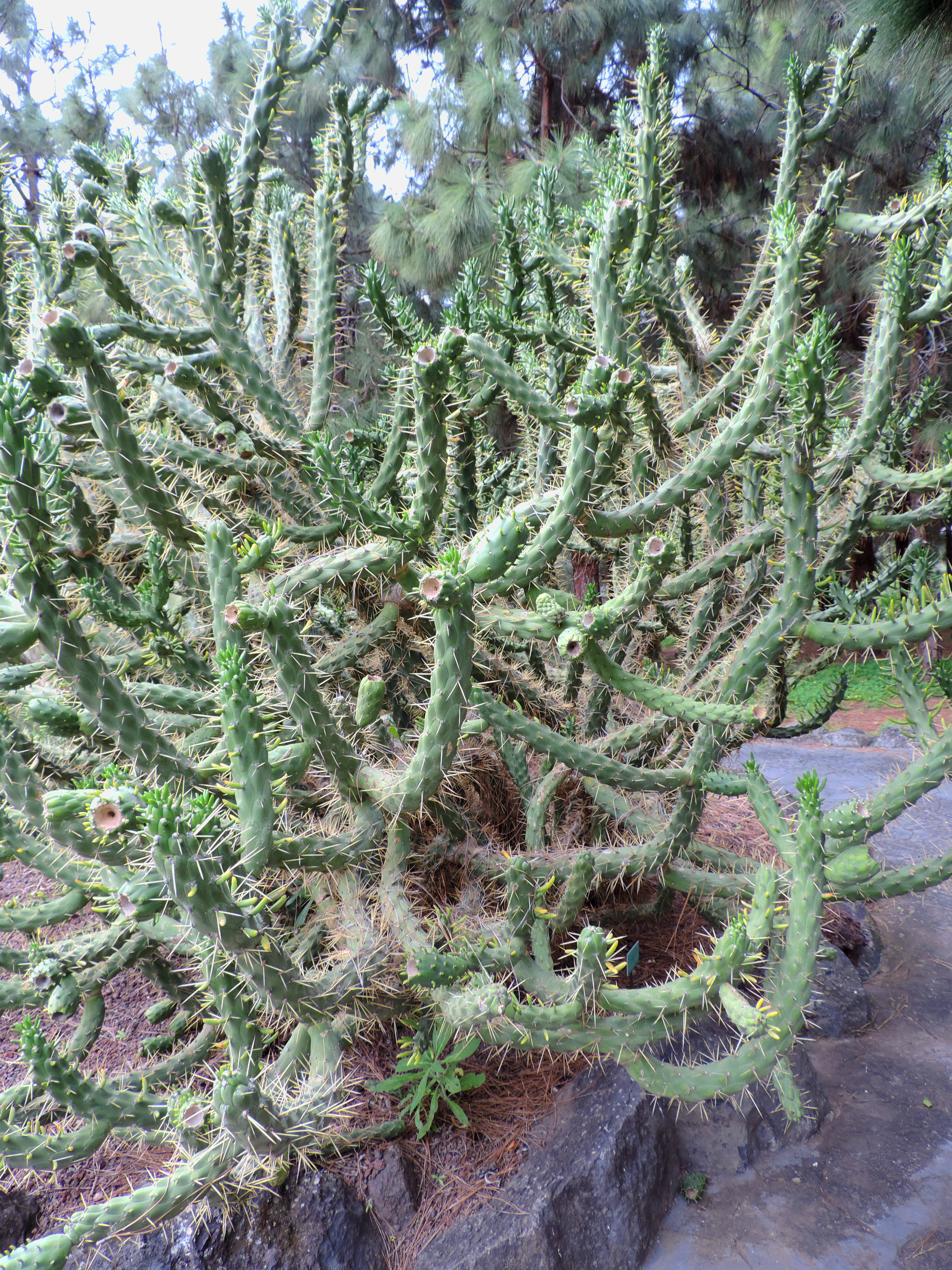
Austrocylindropuntia subulata

Cylindropuntieae – round stems

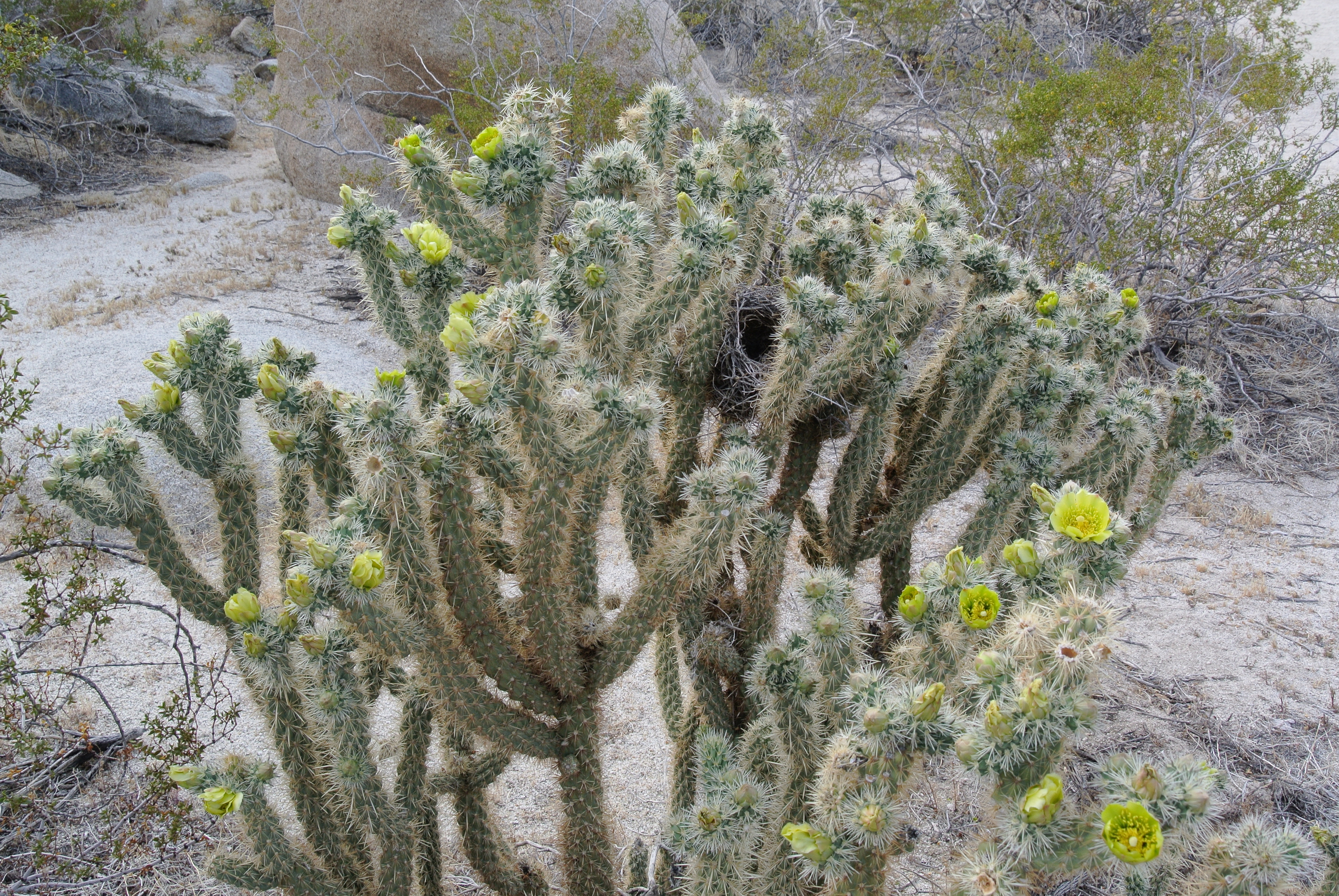
Cylindropuntia bigelovii

- Cylindropuntia (Engelm.) F.M.Knuth
- Grusonia Rchb.f. ex Britton & Rose
- Micropuntia Daston
- Pereskiopsis Britton & Rose
- Quiabentia Britton & Rose

Opuntieae – flattened stems

- Airampoa Frič (synonym Tunilla)
- Brasiliopuntia (K. Schum.) A. Berger
- Consolea Lem.
- Miqueliopuntia Fric ex F. Ritter
- Opuntia Mill.
- Salmonopuntia P.V.Heath
- Tacinga Britton & Rose

Tephrocacteae – round stems

- Austrocylindropuntia Backeb.
- Cumulopuntia F.Ritter
- Maihueniopsis Speg.
- Pterocactus K.Schum.
- Punotia D.R.Hunt
- Tephrocactus Lem.

=== Intergeneric hybrids ===
- × Opulea M.H.J.van der Meer (Consolea × Opuntia)

== See also ==
- Taxonomy of the Cactaceae
