= Glochid =

Detachable, irritating spines on cacti of the sub-family Opuntioideae

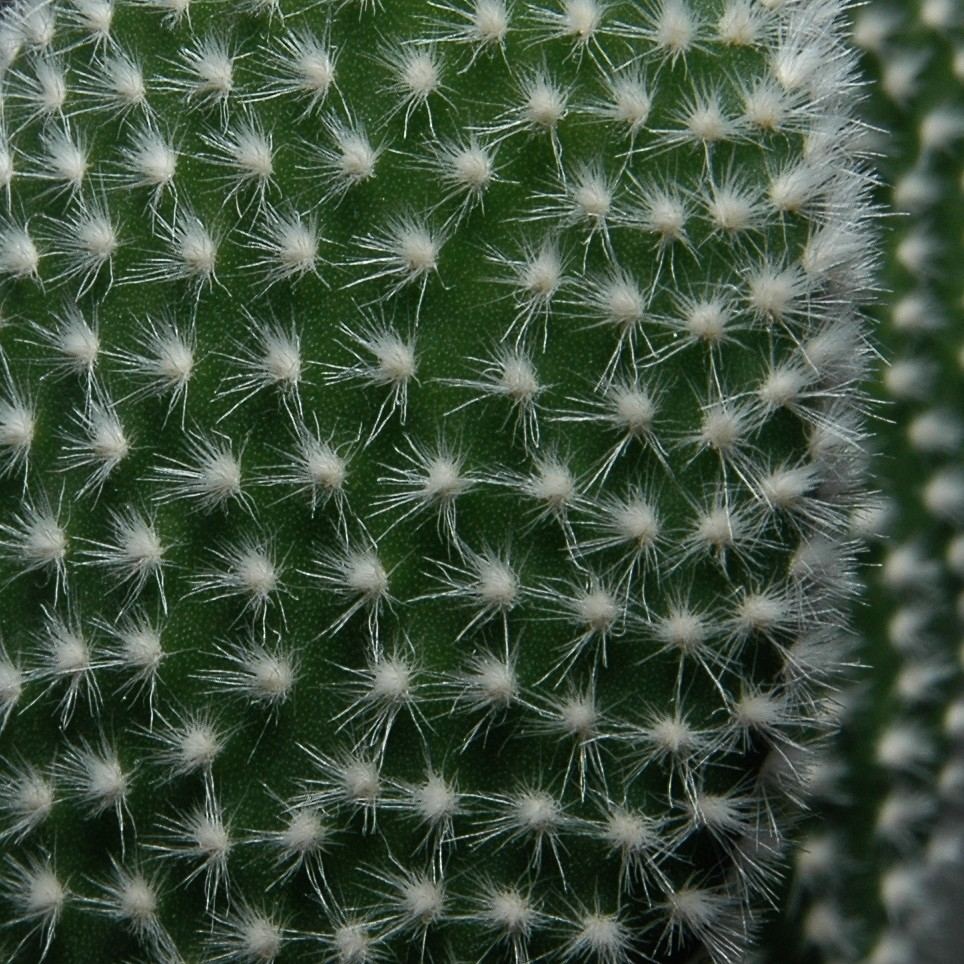
Glochids and spines on a species of Opuntia. The spines are the relatively large, radiating organs; the glochids are the fine prickles in the centres of the bunches.

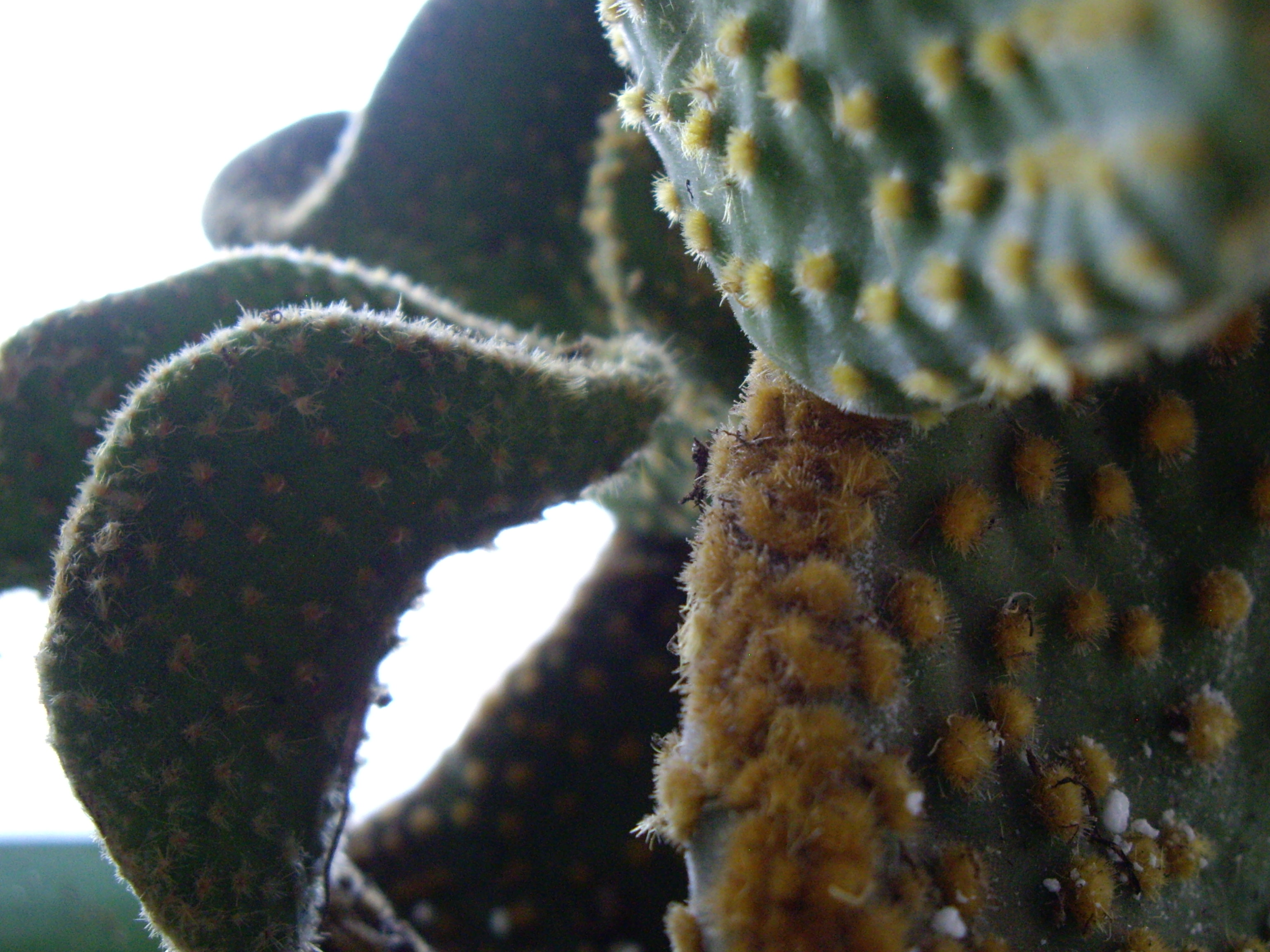
Glochids (Opuntia microdasys monstrose)

Glochids or glochidia (sing.: "glochidium") are hair-like spines or short prickles, generally barbed, found on the areoles of cacti in the sub-family Opuntioideae. Cactus glochids easily detach from the plant and lodge in the skin, causing irritation upon contact. The tufts of glochids in the areoles nearly cover the stem surfaces of some cactus species, each tuft containing hundreds of glochids; this may be in addition to, or instead of, the larger, more conspicuous cactus spines, which do not readily detach and are not generally barbed.

== Mechanical irritant dermatitis ==
=== Reaction to the glochidia ===
Most cacti possess spines, some large enough to cause serious wounds. Glochids however, though smaller, commonly induce more troublesome, more persistent, dermatological manifestations in humans. Though minute, glochids commonly are barbed and once they have penetrated the skin barbed glochids are practically impossible to dislodge without leaving scraps of foreign material in the wound.

Implantation of glochidia in the skin does sometimes cause immediate irritation, but not always, as one may deduce from the presentation of patients with granulomatous lesions around glochidia, patients who have no recollection of the penetration that caused the acute injury, even when it is clear that the injury is far from fresh. Distraction or excitement might cause the victim to overlook brushing past a cactus and picking up a few hundred barely visible glochids. In such cases, the irritant reaction may have a delayed onset. Shanon reported that brushing his axillary skin with sabra fruit resulted in no symptoms for a half-hour, followed by 1 1/2 hours of "stabbing feelings". Winer reports immediate burning sensation, redness and swelling which remained for one to three days if the spines were removed. Depending on the exposure, widespread areas may be involved, even extending to hard palate, tongue, conjunctiva and cornea.

If the glochidia are not removed, a response may ensue that eventuates in granulomatous dermatitis. Within 24 to 72 hours there is the appearance of 2- to 5-mm, asymptomatic, domed, glistening papules, sometimes erythematous, with a central pin-point-sized black dot at the site of the injury. There may be groups of these papules. Vesicles and pustules and even focal ulceration may also occur. In some instances, diagnosis can be made easily by passing the fingers over the affected area and by feeling the embedded glochidia.

Left untreated, these lesions may last as long as 9 months. A biopsy of the later lesions reveals granuloma formation with plant material embedded in the dermis. The fragments of the barbed bristles gave strongly positive reactions with PAS. The presence of a cactus granuloma lesion is often followed by post-inflammatory hyperpigmentation.

Penetrating injuries can introduce pathogenic microorganisms into the wound. Examples include Clostridium tetani and Staphylococcus aureus (from spines and thorns), Sporothrix schenckii (from rose thorns, grasses, and sphagnum moss), Mycobacterium kansasii (from blackberries), Mycobacterium marinum (from cactus spines), and Mycobacterium ulcerans (from spiky tropical vegetation).

Glochids from prickly pears (Opuntia species) can cause an extremely itchy, papular eruption called sabra dermatitis, which can easily be confused with scabies or fiberglass dermatitis.

=== Sabra dermatitis ===
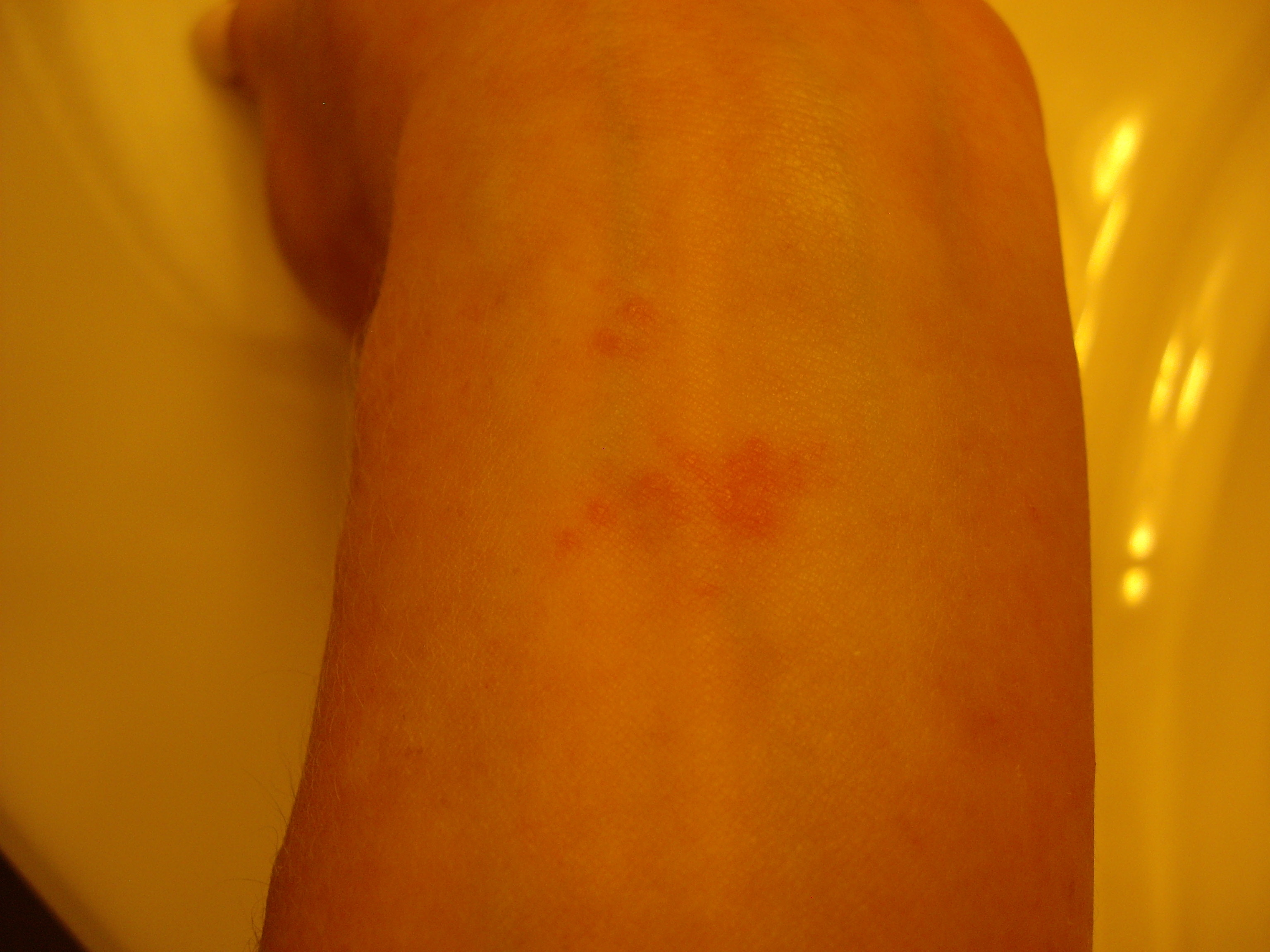
Sabra dermatitis

The skin reaction of gatherers of the fruit was described in Israel and is known as "sabra dermatitis". This condition is characterized by a papular or vesicular reaction that is sometimes scabies-like. It has also been described as tinea-like and dyshidrosis-like. The hard palate and tongue are occasionally affected. Typical areas of involvement of this irritant dermatitis include fingers, wrists, genitals, thorax, and buttocks. Biopsy of these lesions will reveal that they contain glochidia. Glochidia may be transferred to the workers' clothing and thence to other individuals. It is recommended that the fruit should be picked only when wetted, and picking should be stopped when it is windy since the glochidia can become airborne.

== Removal of glochidia ==
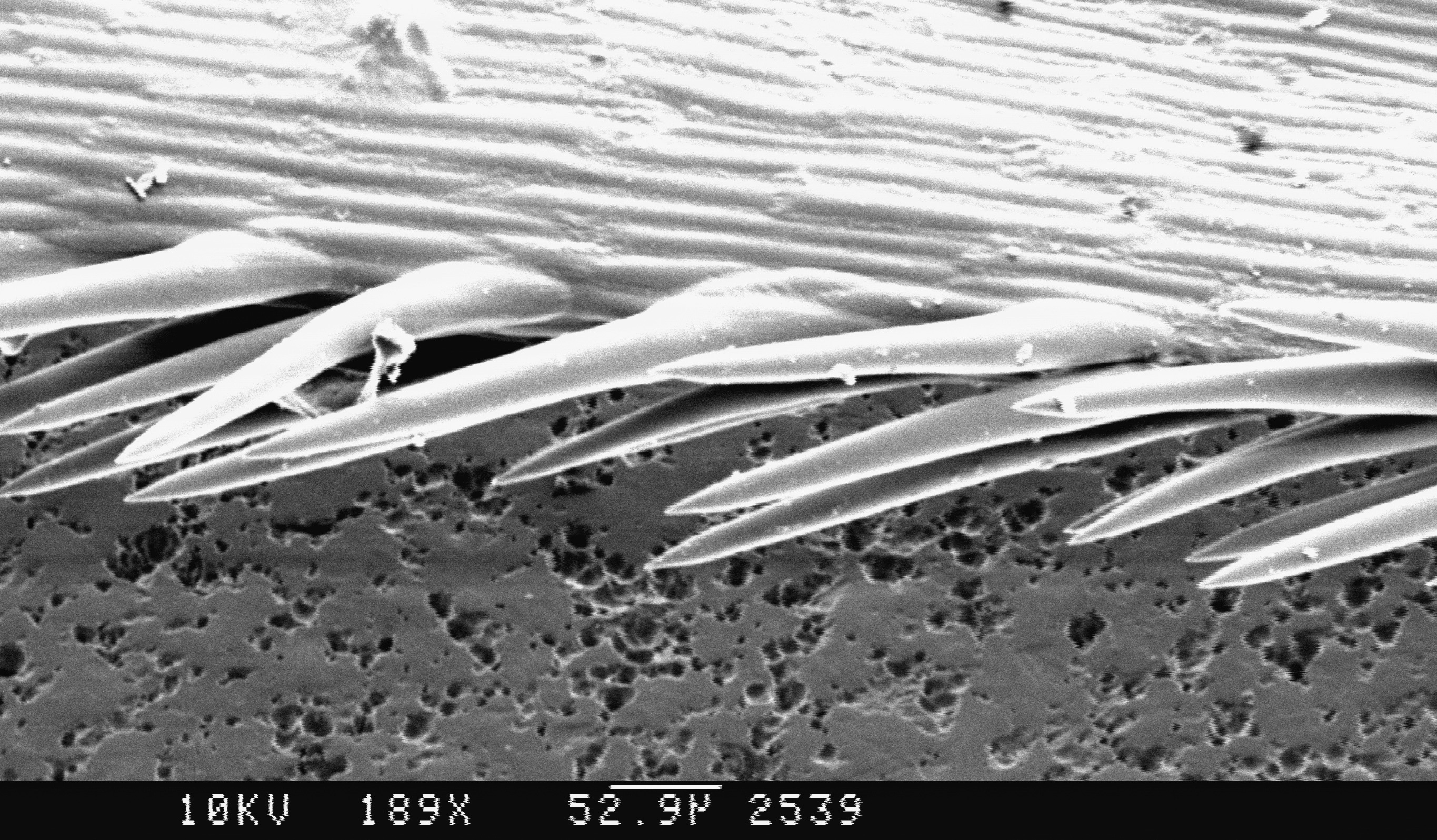
Glochids are barbed, making removal difficult. Pictured is the similarly barbed foxtail.

If the glochidia are allowed to remain in the skin, a dermatitis may ensue that will persist for months. It may help to treat the affected area with a topical corticosteroid. However, since the presence of glochidia is the inciting factor, removal of these minute spines is generally preferable.

Glochidia may be difficult to remove. Yanking out the bristles may result in leaving one or more 20–30 micrometre sized barbs in the skin, later to be manifested by granuloma formation. Attempts to suck out the glochidia are likely to result in their attachment to the tongue. Popular methods of removing glochidia have included spreading adhesive plaster over the area and ripping it off quickly or using melted wax (as is used in wax hair removal). Martinez et al. studied various methods of removing glochidia from rabbit skin. They evaluated tweezers, glue, facial mask, adhesive tape, package-sealing tape, and tweezing followed by glue. The most effective single method was tweezing, which removed 76% of the spines. The method using a thin layer of household glue covered with gauze, allowed to dry (about 30 minutes) and then peeled off resulted in removal of 63% of the spines. Facial masks and adhesive tapes removed about 40% and 30% of the spines, respectively, and produced more retention and inflammation three days after removal than no treatment. Repeated applications of adhesive tape did not improve the results. According to Martinez, the most effective method is to first use tweezers to remove clumps of spines followed by the application and removal of household glue, resulting in removal of 95% of the spines.

Unroofing the early vesicles or pustules may permit manual extraction of the spicules. Soaking unroofed papules may allow for extrusion of the glochidia. Faster resolution may be obtained by removing the papules. A method of treatment has been described for the granulomatous papules, and involves unroofing the granulomatous papules, removing the glochidia fragments under a dissecting microscope, and subsequently soaking the wound in an antibacterial solution.
