= Taxonomy of the Cactaceae =

Classification of cacti

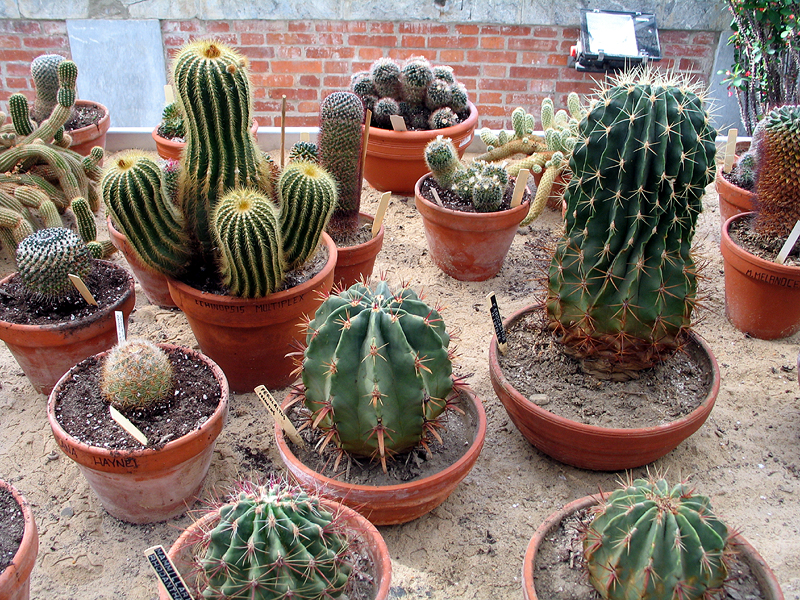
A collection of cultivated cacti

In 1984, the International Organization for Succulent Plant Study set up a working party, now called the International Cactaceae Systematics Group, to produce a consensus classification of the cactus family, down to the level of genus. Their classification has been used as the basis for systems published since the mid-1990s. Treatments in the 21st century have generally divided the family into around 125–130 genera and 1,400–1,500 species, which are then arranged in a number of tribes and subfamilies. However, subsequent molecular phylogenetic studies have shown that a very high proportion of the higher taxa (genera, tribes and subfamilies) are not monophyletic, i.e. they do not contain all of the descendants of a common ancestor. As of August 2023, the internal classification of the family Cactaceae remained uncertain and subject to change. A classification incorporating many of the insights from the molecular studies was produced by Nyffeler and Eggli in 2010.

== Overview ==
The classification of the family Cactaceae remains uncertain as of August 2023. Since the mid-1990s, the system produced by the International Cactaceae Systematics Group (ICSG) of the International Organization for Succulent Plant Study has been used as the basis of many published classifications. Detailed treatments produced in the 21st century have divided the family into around 125–130 genera and 1,400–1,500 species, which are then arranged into a number of tribes and subfamilies.

The ICSG classification of the family recognizes four subfamilies: Pereskioideae (consisting only of the genus Pereskia), Opuntioideae, Maihuenioideae (consisting only of the genus Maihuenia) and Cactoideae. Molecular phylogenetic studies suggest that Pereskia is not monophyletic (i.e. its species are not the complete set of descendants of a common ancestor), so that Pereskioideae is not monophyletic although the three other subfamilies are. The Bayesian consensus cladogram from a 2005 study is shown below:

- Cactaceae
  - Pereskia Clade A
  - - Pereskia Clade B
    - - Opuntioideae
      - - Maihuenioideae
        - Cactoideae

Five tribes have been recognized within the subfamily Opuntioideae: Tephrocacteae, Pterocacteae, Austrocylindropuntieae, Cylindropuntieae and Opuntieae. All but the first, Tephrocacteae, were shown to be "essentially monophyletic" in molecular phylogenetic study in 2009. A summary of the consensus Bayesian tree is shown below (tribes are bold; the number of species in the study is shown in parentheses).

- - Puna (1), Maihueniopsis (3), Cumulopuntia (1) = **Tephrocacteae (part)**
  - - Pterocactus (6) = **Pterocacteae**
    - - terete‑stemmed opuntioids
        - Maihueniopsis (1), Puna (1), Tephrocactus (7) = **Tephrocacteae (part)**
        - Maihueniopsis (1), Cumulopuntia (5), Puna (1), Austrocylindropuntia (4) ≈ **Austrocylindropuntieae**
        - Quiabentia (1), Pereskiopsis (2), Micropuntia (2), Cylindropuntia (12), Grusonia s.s. (1), Corynopuntia (6) ≈ **Cylindropuntieae**
      - flat‑stemmed opuntioids
        - Miqueliopuntia (1), Tunilla (2), Maihueniopsis (1)
        - - Opuntia (2)
          - Brasiliopuntia (1), Opuntia (1), Tacinga (2)
          - Opuntia (28), Consolea (6), Nopalea (7)

Many of the genera within the Opuntioideae are not monophyletic. Maihueniopsis is highly polyphyletic, appearing in four separate lineages. The two largest genera within the subfamily, Opuntia and Cylindropuntia are also not monophyletic. The classification of the Opuntioideae is thus uncertain as of March 2012; Griffith and Porter say that changes in classification will require "broad information (of multiple data types) regarding all species of opuntioid cacti".

The ICSG classification divides the subfamily Cactoideae into nine tribes. However, phylogenetic research has not supported most of these tribes, nor even the genera of which they are composed. A 2011 study found that "an extraordinarily high proportion of genera" were not monophyletic, including 22 (61%) of the 36 genera in the subfamily Cactoideae sampled in the research. Of the nine tribes recognized within Cactoideae, one, Calymmantheae, comprises a single genus, Calymmanthium. Of the remaining eight, only two (Cacteae and Rhipsalideae) have been shown to be monophyletic. A summary of the cladograms for the Cactoideae presented in a 2011 paper is shown below (ICSG tribes in bold).

- Cactoideae
  - Blossfeldia
  - - **Cacteae**
    - core Cactoideae
      - **Calymmantheae** (i.e. Calymmanthium), species of Copiapoa and Frailea
      - - core Cactoideae I
          including members of **Pachycereeae**, **Hylocereeae** and **Browningieae**
        - core Cactoideae II
          - **Rhipsalideae**
          - other core Cactoideae II, including members of **Notocacteae**, **Trichocereeae**, **Cereeae** and **Browningieae**

The classification of the Cactaceae thus remains subject to change, from the genus level upwards. In 2016, David Hunt wrote that "the advent of molecular systematic studies in the past two decades will hopefully have a stabilizing effect on classification in due course, but has so far had the opposite effect".

== Nyffler and Eggli (2010) classification ==
In 2010, Nyffler and Eggli produced a classification based on an explicit phylogeny. The broad outlines of their cladogram agree with that of Hern et al. (2011), shown above, although some details are different. Their classification corresponds to the cladogram shown below.

- Cactaceae
  - - Pereskia A
    - - Pereskia B
      - - Maihuenia
        - - incertae sedis
          - - Cylindropuntieae
            - Opuntieae
        - - Blossfeldia (Blossfeldieae)
          - - Cacteae
            - - incertae sedis
              - Phyllocacteae
              - - Rhipsalideae
                - - Notocacteae
                  - Cereeae

The table below shows how the genera recognized by Nyffler and Eggli are placed into their subfamilies and tribes (they also use some subtribes, not shown here). The column headed "Older tribe (if different)" shows the ICSG classification of the subfamily Cactoideae (as presented by Anderson in 2001) with a 2002 classification of the subfamily Opuntioideae. There are differences in the genera recognized in the systems; where the older system does not recognize the genus, "–" is shown.

Nyffeller & Eggli (2010) classification
| Systematic order | Genus | Subfamily | Tribe | Older tribe (if different) |
|---|---|---|---|---|
| 1 | Pereskia Mill. | Pereskioideae* | | |
| 2 | Maihuenia (Phil.ex F.A.C.Weber) K.Schum. | Maihuenioideae | | |
| 3.1 | Austrocylindropuntia Backeb. | Opuntioideae | Cylindropuntieae | Austrocylindropuntieae |
| 3.1 | Cumulopuntia F.Ritter (part) | Opuntioideae | Cylindropuntieae | Austrocylindropuntieae |
| 3.1 | Cylindropuntia (Engelm.) F.M.Knuth | Opuntioideae | Cylindropuntieae | |
| 3.1 | Grusonia F.Rchb.ex Britton & Rose | Opuntioideae | Cylindropuntieae | |
| 3.1 | Maihueniopsis Speg. (part) | Opuntioideae | Cylindropuntieae | Tephrocacteae |
| 3.1 | Pereskiopsis Britton & Rose | Opuntioideae | Cylindropuntieae | |
| 3.1 | Quiabentia Britton & Rose | Opuntioideae | Cylindropuntieae | |
| 3.1 | Tephrocactus Lem. | Opuntioideae | Cylindropuntieae | Tephrocacteae |
| 3.2 | Brasiliopuntia (K.Schum.) A.Berger | Opuntioideae | Opuntieae | |
| 3.2 | Consolea Lem. | Opuntioideae | Opuntieae | |
| 3.2 | Miqueliopuntia Fric ex F.Ritter | Opuntioideae | Opuntieae | |
| 3.2 | Opuntia Mill. | Opuntioideae | Opuntieae | |
| 3.2 | Tacinga Britton & Rose | Opuntioideae | Opuntieae | |
| 3.2 | Tunilla D.R.Hunt & Iliff | Opuntioideae | Opuntieae | |
| 3.3 | Cumulopuntia F.Ritter (part) | Opuntioideae | incertae sedis | Austrocylindropuntieae |
| 3.3 | Maihueniopsis Speg. (part) | Opuntioideae | incertae sedis | Tephrocacteae |
| 3.3 | Pterocactus K.Schum. | Opuntioideae | incertae sedis | Pterocacteae |
| 4.1 | Blossfeldia Werderm. | Cactoideae | Blossfeldieae | Notocacteae |
| 4.2 | Acharagma (N.P.Taylor) Glass | Cactoideae | Cacteae | |
| 4.2 | Ariocarpus Scheidw. | Cactoideae | Cacteae | |
| 4.2 | Astrophytum Lem. | Cactoideae | Cacteae | |
| 4.2 | Aztekium Boed. | Cactoideae | Cacteae | |
| 4.2 | Coryphantha (Engelm.) Lem. | Cactoideae | Cacteae | |
| 4.2 | Digitostigma Velazco & Nevárez | Cactoideae | Cacteae | – |
| 4.2 | Echinocactus Link & Otto | Cactoideae | Cacteae | |
| 4.2 | Echinomastus Britton & Rose | Cactoideae | Cacteae | |
| 4.2 | Epithelantha F.A.C.Weber ex Britton & Rose | Cactoideae | Cacteae | |
| 4.2 | Escobaria Britton & Rose | Cactoideae | Cacteae | |
| 4.2 | Ferocactus Britton & Rose | Cactoideae | Cacteae | |
| 4.2 | Geohintonia Glass & W.A.Fitz Maur. | Cactoideae | Cacteae | |
| 4.2 | Leuchtenbergia Hook. | Cactoideae | Cacteae | |
| 4.2 | Lophophora J.M.Coult. | Cactoideae | Cacteae | |
| 4.2 | Mammillaria Haw. including Cochemiea (K.Brandegee) Walton, Mammilloydia Buxb. | Cactoideae | Cacteae | |
| 4.2 | Neolloydia Britton & Rose | Cactoideae | Cacteae | |
| 4.2 | Obregonia Fric | Cactoideae | Cacteae | |
| 4.2 | Ortegocactus Alexander | Cactoideae | Cacteae | |
| 4.2 | Pediocactus Britton & Rose | Cactoideae | Cacteae | |
| 4.2 | Pelecyphora C.Ehrenb. | Cactoideae | Cacteae | |
| 4.2 | Sclerocactus Britton & Rose | Cactoideae | Cacteae | |
| 4.2 | Stenocactus (K.Schum.) A.W.Hill | Cactoideae | Cacteae | |
| 4.2 | Strombocactus Britton & Rose | Cactoideae | Cacteae | |
| 4.2 | Thelocactus (K.Schum.) Britton & Rose | Cactoideae | Cacteae | |
| 4.2 | Turbinicarpus (Backeb.) Buxb.& Backeb. | Cactoideae | Cacteae | |
| 4.3 | Acanthocereus (Engelm.ex A.Berger) Britton & Rose | Cactoideae | Phyllocacteae | Pachycereeae |
| 4.3 | Armatocereus Backeb. | Cactoideae | Phyllocacteae | Browningieae |
| 4.3 | Austrocactus Britton & Rose | Cactoideae | Phyllocacteae | Notocacteae |
| 4.3 | Brachycereus Britton & Rose | Cactoideae | Phyllocacteae | Trichocereeae |
| 4.3 | Castellanosia Cárdenas | Cactoideae | Phyllocacteae | – |
| 4.3 | Corryocactus Britton & Rose | Cactoideae | Phyllocacteae | Pachycereeae |
| 4.3 | Dendrocereus Britton & Rose | Cactoideae | Phyllocacteae | Pachycereeae |
| 4.3 | Eulychnia Phil. | Cactoideae | Phyllocacteae | Notocacteae |
| 4.3 | Jasminocereus Britton & Rose | Cactoideae | Phyllocacteae | Browningieae |
| 4.3 | Leptocereus (A.Berger) Britton & Rose | Cactoideae | Phyllocacteae | Pachycereeae |
| 4.3 | Neoraimondia Britton & Rose | Cactoideae | Phyllocacteae | Browningieae |
| 4.3 | Pfeiffera Salm-Dyck | Cactoideae | Phyllocacteae | – |
| 4.3 | Disocactus Lindl. | Cactoideae | Phyllocacteae | Hylocereeae |
| 4.3 | Epiphyllum Haw. | Cactoideae | Phyllocacteae | Hylocereeae |
| 4.3 | Hylocereus (A.Berger) Britton & Rose | Cactoideae | Phyllocacteae | Hylocereeae |
| 4.3 | Pseudorhipsalis Britton & Rose | Cactoideae | Phyllocacteae | Hylocereeae |
| 4.3 | Selenicereus (A.Berger) Britton & Rose | Cactoideae | Phyllocacteae | Hylocereeae |
| 4.3 | Weberocereus Britton & Rose | Cactoideae | Phyllocacteae | Hylocereeae |
| 4.3 | Bergerocactus Britton & Rose | Cactoideae | Phyllocacteae | Pachycereeae |
| 4.3 | Carnegiea Britton & Rose | Cactoideae | Phyllocacteae | Pachycereeae |
| 4.3 | Cephalocereus Pfeiff. | Cactoideae | Phyllocacteae | Pachycereeae |
| 4.3 | Echinocereus Engelm. | Cactoideae | Phyllocacteae | Pachycereeae |
| 4.3 | Escontria Rose | Cactoideae | Phyllocacteae | Pachycereeae |
| 4.3 | Isolatocereus Backeb. | Cactoideae | Phyllocacteae | Pachycereeae |
| 4.3 | Myrtillocactus Console | Cactoideae | Phyllocacteae | Pachycereeae |
| 4.3 | Neobuxbaumia Backeb. | Cactoideae | Phyllocacteae | Pachycereeae |
| 4.3 | Pachycereus (A.Berger) Britton & Rose | Cactoideae | Phyllocacteae | Pachycereeae |
| 4.3 | Peniocereus (A.Berger) Britton & Rose | Cactoideae | Phyllocacteae | Pachycereeae |
| 4.3 | Polaskia Backeb. | Cactoideae | Phyllocacteae | Pachycereeae |
| 4.3 | Pseudoacanthocereus F.Ritter | Cactoideae | Phyllocacteae | Pachycereeae |
| 4.3 | Stenocereus (A.Berger) Riccob. | Cactoideae | Phyllocacteae | Pachycereeae |
| 4.3 | Strophocactus Britton & Rose | Cactoideae | Phyllocacteae | – |
| 4.4 | Hatiora Britton & Rose | Cactoideae | Rhipsalideae | |
| 4.4 | Lepismium Pfeiff. | Cactoideae | Rhipsalideae | |
| 4.4 | Rhipsalis Gaertn. | Cactoideae | Rhipsalideae | |
| 4.4 | Schlumbergera Lem. | Cactoideae | Rhipsalideae | |
| 4.5 | Eriosyce Phil. | Cactoideae | Notocacteae | |
| 4.5 | Neowerdermannia Fric | Cactoideae | Notocacteae | |
| 4.5 | Parodia Speg. | Cactoideae | Notocacteae | |
| 4.5 | Rimacactus Mottram | Cactoideae | Notocacteae | – |
| 4.5 | Yavia R.Kiesling & Piltz | Cactoideae | Notocacteae | – |
| 4.6 | Browningia Cárdenas | Cactoideae | Cereeae | Browningieae |
| 4.6 | Gymnocalycium Pfeiff.ex Mittler | Cactoideae | Cereeae | Trichocereeae |
| 4.6 | Lasiocereus F.Ritter | Cactoideae | Cereeae | Trichocereeae |
| 4.6 | Rebutia K.Schum. | Cactoideae | Cereeae | Trichocereeae |
| 4.6 | Stetsonia Britton & Rose | Cactoideae | Cereeae | Browningieae |
| 4.6 | Uebelmannia Buining | Cactoideae | Cereeae | |
| 4.6 | Weingartia Werderm. including Cintia Knize & Ríha | Cactoideae | Cereeae | Notocacteae (Cintia) |
| 4.6 | Arrojadoa Britton & Rose | Cactoideae | Cereeae | |
| 4.6 | Brasilicereus Backeb. | Cactoideae | Cereeae | |
| 4.6 | Cereus Mill. | Cactoideae | Cereeae | |
| 4.6 | Cipocereus F.Ritter | Cactoideae | Cereeae | |
| 4.6 | Coleocephalocereus Backeb. | Cactoideae | Cereeae | |
| 4.6 | Discocactus Pfeiff. | Cactoideae | Cereeae | Trichocereeae |
| 4.6 | Facheiroa Britton & Rose | Cactoideae | Cereeae | Trichocereeae |
| 4.6 | Leocereus Britton & Rose (synonym of Facheiroa) | Cactoideae | Cereeae | Trichocereeae |
| 4.6 | Melocactus Link & Otto | Cactoideae | Cereeae | |
| 4.6 | Micranthocereus Backeb. | Cactoideae | Cereeae | |
| 4.6 | Pierrebraunia Esteves | Cactoideae | Cereeae | – |
| 4.6 | Pilosocereus Byles & G.D.Rowley | Cactoideae | Cereeae | |
| 4.6 | Praecereus Buxb. | Cactoideae | Cereeae | |
| 4.6 | Stephanocereus A.Berger | Cactoideae | Cereeae | |
| 4.6 | Acanthocalycium Backeb. | Cactoideae | Cereeae | Trichocereeae |
| 4.6 | Arthrocereus A.Berger | Cactoideae | Cereeae | Trichocereeae |
| 4.6 | Borzicactus Riccob. | Cactoideae | Cereeae | – |
| 4.6 | Cephalocleistocactus F.Ritter | Cactoideae | Cereeae | Trichocereeae |
| 4.6 | Cleistocactus Lem. (including Samaipaticereus and Yungasocereus) | Cactoideae | Cereeae | Trichocereeae |
| 4.6 | Denmoza Britton & Rose | Cactoideae | Cereeae | Trichocereeae |
| 4.6 | Echinopsis Zucc. | Cactoideae | Cereeae | Trichocereeae |
| 4.6 | Espostoa Britton & Rose | Cactoideae | Cereeae | Trichocereeae |
| 4.6 | Espostoopsis Buxb. | Cactoideae | Cereeae | Trichocereeae |
| 4.6 | Haageocereus Backeb. including Pygmaeocereus H.Johnson & Backeb. | Cactoideae | Cereeae | Trichocereeae |
| 4.6 | Harrisia Britton | Cactoideae | Cereeae | Trichocereeae |
| 4.6 | Matucana Britton & Rose | Cactoideae | Cereeae | Trichocereeae |
| 4.6 | Mila Britton & Rose | Cactoideae | Cereeae | Trichocereeae |
| 4.6 | Oreocereus (A.Berger) Riccob. | Cactoideae | Cereeae | Trichocereeae |
| 4.6 | Oroya Britton & Rose | Cactoideae | Cereeae | Trichocereeae |
| 4.6 | Rauhocereus Backeb. | Cactoideae | Cereeae | Trichocereeae |
| 4.6 | Samaipaticereus Cárdenas | Cactoideae | Cereeae | Trichocereeae |
| 4.6 | Vatricania Backeb. | Cactoideae | Cereeae | – |
| 4.6 | Weberbauerocereus Backeb. | Cactoideae | Cereeae | Trichocereeae |
| 4.7 | Calymmanthium F.Ritter | Cactoideae | incertae sedis | Calymmantheae |
| 4.7 | Copiapoa Britton & Rose | Cactoideae | incertae sedis | Notocacteae |
| 4.7 | Frailea Britton & Rose | Cactoideae | incertae sedis | Notocacteae |

== Earlier classification ==
Unless otherwise indicated, the subfamily placement of the genera listed here is based on Anderson's 2001 presentation of the ICSG classification, as is the tribal placement of the genera of the subfamily Cactoideae. The division of the subfamily Opuntioideae into tribes is additional to the ICSG system.

=== Subfamily Pereskioideae ===
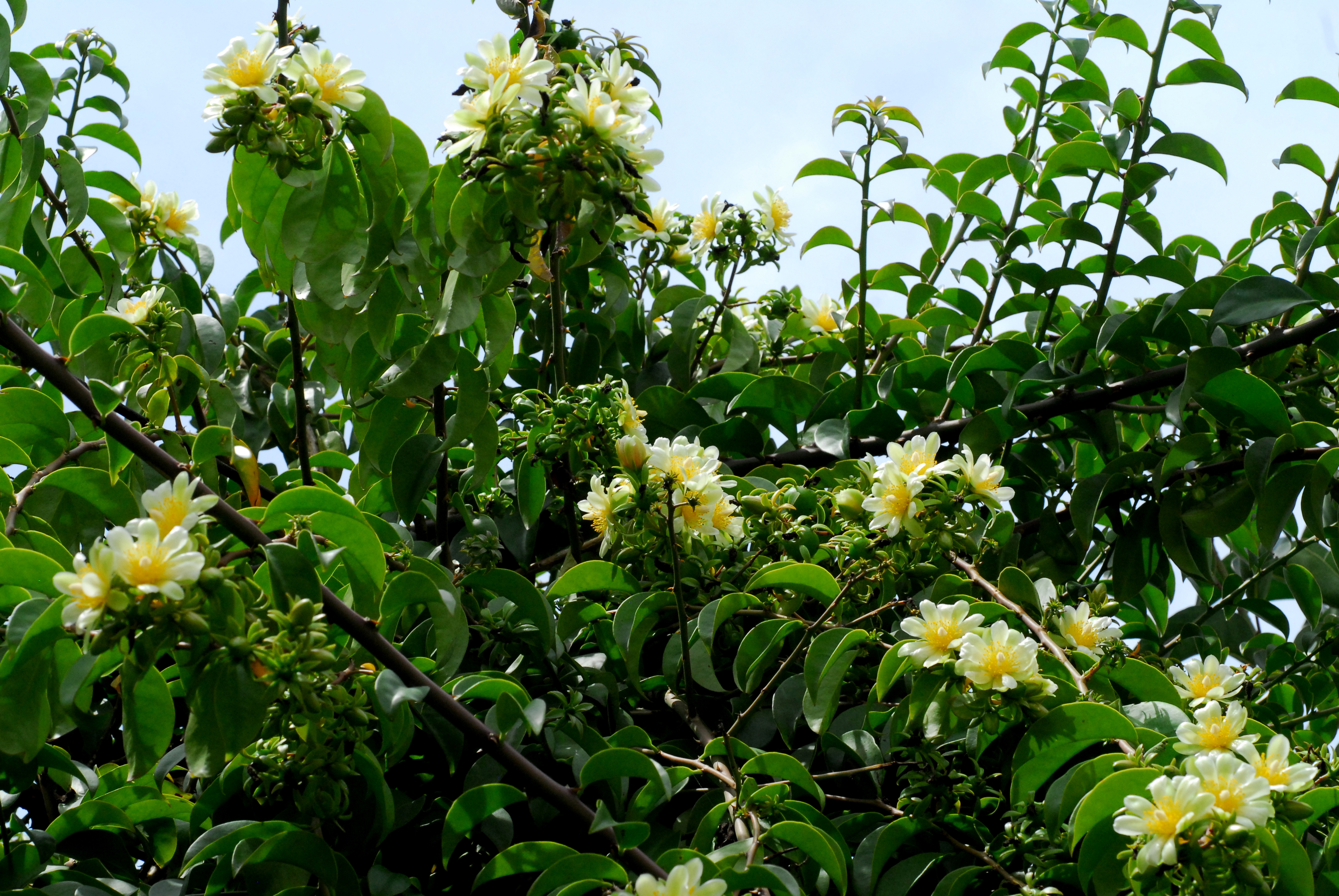
Pereskia aculeata

- Pereskia Mill.

synonyms: Peirescia Zucc. (orth. var.), Peireskia Steud. (orth. var.), Perescia Lem. (orth. var.), Rhodocactus (A.Berger) F.M.Knuth

=== Subfamily Opuntioideae ===
==== Tribe Austrocylindropuntieae ====
- Austrocylindropuntia Backeb.
- Cumulopuntia F.Ritter

==== Tribe Cylindropuntieae ====
- Cylindropuntia (Engelm.) F.M.Knuth – chollas
- Grusonia F.Rchb. ex Britton & Rose

including Corynopuntia F.M.Knuth, Micropuntia Daston

- Pereskiopsis Britton & Rose

synonyms: Peireskiopsis Vaupel (orth. var.)

- Quiabentia Britton & Rose

==== Tribe Opuntieae ====
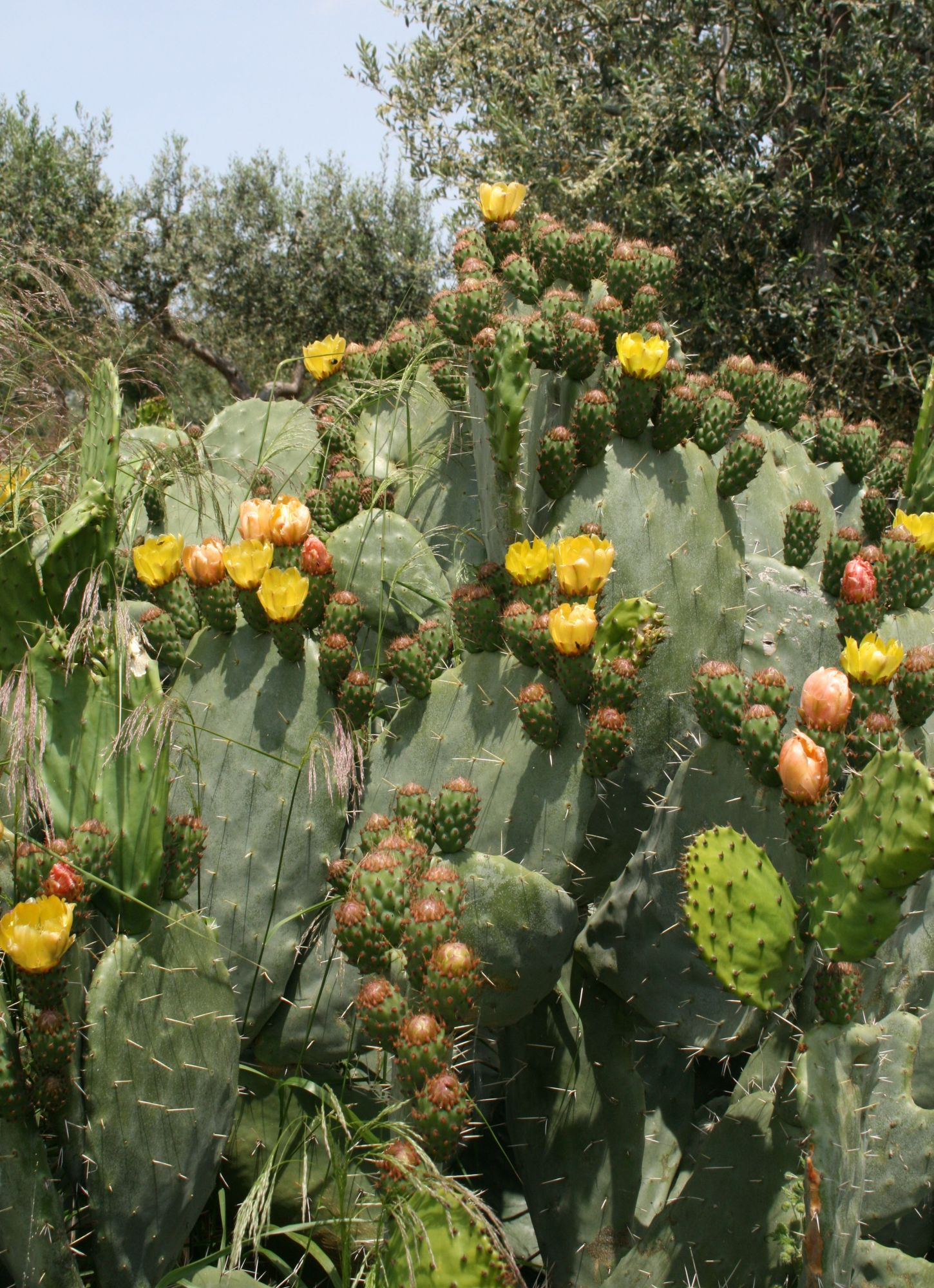
Opuntia ficus-indica

- Brasiliopuntia (K.Schum.) A.Berger
- Consolea Lem.
- Miqueliopuntia Fric ex F.Ritter
- Opuntia Mill. – prickly pears

synonyms: Airampoa Fric, Cactodendron Bigelow, nom. inval., Cactus Lem., Chaffeyopuntia Fric & Schelle, Clavarioidia Kreuz. (nom. inval.), Ficindica St.-Lag., Nopalea Salm-Dyck, Parviopuntia Soulaire & Marn.-Lap. (nom. inval.), Phyllarthus Neck. ex M.Gómez (nom. inval.), Salmiopuntia Fric (nom. inval.), Subulatopuntia Fric & Schelle, Tunas Lunell, Weberiopuntia Fric
including Nopalea Salm-Dyck

- Salmonopuntia P.V.Heath
- Tacinga Britton & Rose
- Tunilla D.R.Hunt & Iliff

==== Tribe Pterocacteae ====
- Pterocactus K.Schum.

==== Tribe Tephrocacteae ====
- Maihueniopsis Speg.

including Puna R.Kiesling

- Tephrocactus Lem.

synonyms: Pseudotephrocactus Fric

=== Subfamily Maihuenioideae ===
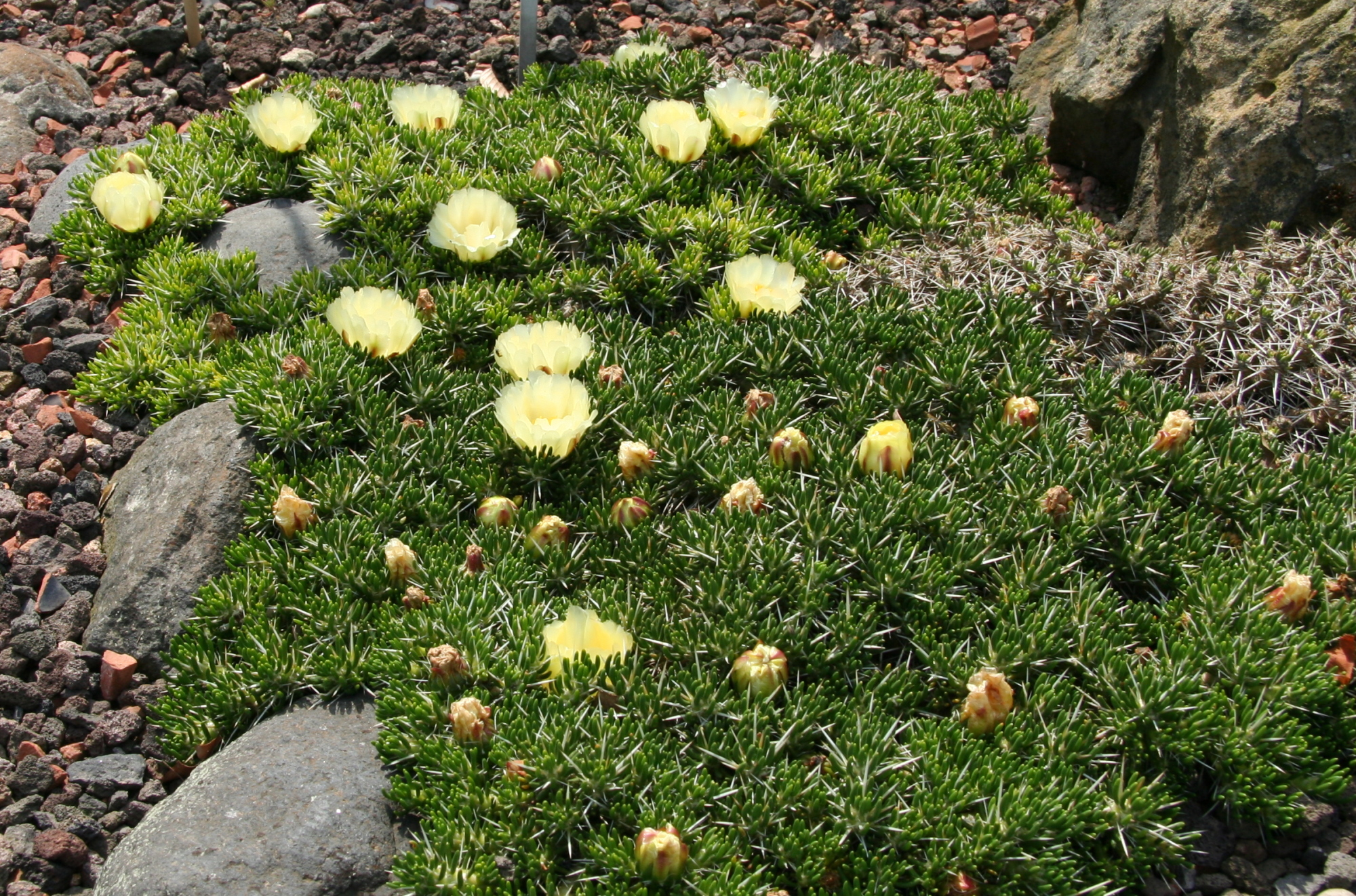
Maihuenia poeppigii

- Maihuenia (Phil. ex F.A.C.Weber) K.Schum.

=== Subfamily Cactoideae ===
==== Tribe Browningieae ====
- Armatocereus Backeb.
- Browningia Cárdenas, Gymnocereus Rauh & Backeb.
- Jasminocereus Britton & Rose
- Neoraimondia Britton & Rose

synonyms: Neocardenasia Backeb.

- Stetsonia Britton & Rose

==== Tribe Cacteae ====
- Acharagma (N.P.Taylor) Glass
- Ariocarpus Scheidw. – living rock

synonyms: Anhalonium Lem., Neogomesia Castañeda, Neogomezia Buxb. (orth. var.), Roseocactus A.Berger, Stromatocactus Karw. ex Rümpler (nom. inval.)

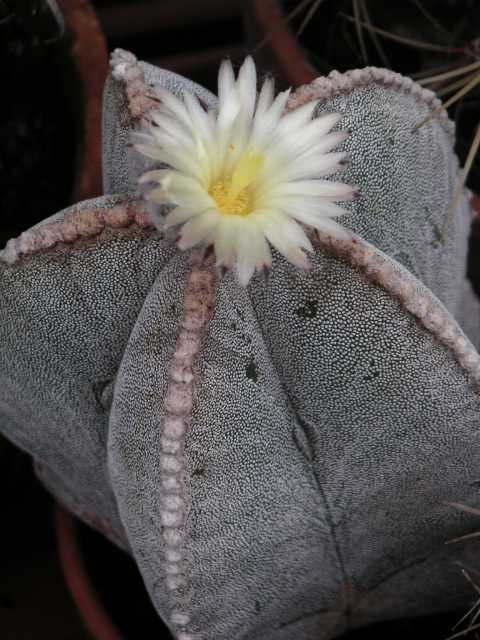
Astrophytum myriostigma

- Astrophytum Lem.

synonyms: Astrophyton Lawr. (orth. var.), Maierocactus E.C.Rost

- Aztekium Boed.
- Chichimecactus Bárcenas, H.M.Hern. & P.Hern.-Led.
- Cochemiea (K.Brandegee) Walton
- Coryphantha (Engelm.) Lem. – beehive cactus

synonyms: Aulacothele Monv. (nom. inval.), Glandulifera (Salm-Dyck) Fric, Lepidocoryphantha Backeb., Roseia Fric (nom. inval.)

- Cumarinia (Boed.) Buxb.
- Echinocactus Link & Otto – barrel cactus

synonyms: Brittonrosea Speg., Echinofossulocactus Lawr., Homalocephala Britton & Rose

- Echinomastus Britton & Rose
- Epithelantha F.A.C.Weber ex Britton & Rose – pingpong ball cactus
- Escobaria Britton & Rose – foxtail cactus, pincushion cactus

synonyms: Cochiseia W.H.Earle, Escobesseya Hester, Fobea Fric (nom. inval.), Neobesseya Britton & Rose

- Ferocactus Britton & Rose – barrel cactus

synonyms: Bisnaga Orcutt, Brittonia C.A.Armstr. (nom. inval.)

- Geohintonia Glass & W.A.Fitz Maur.
- Leuchtenbergia Hook.
- Lophophora J.M.Coult. – peyote

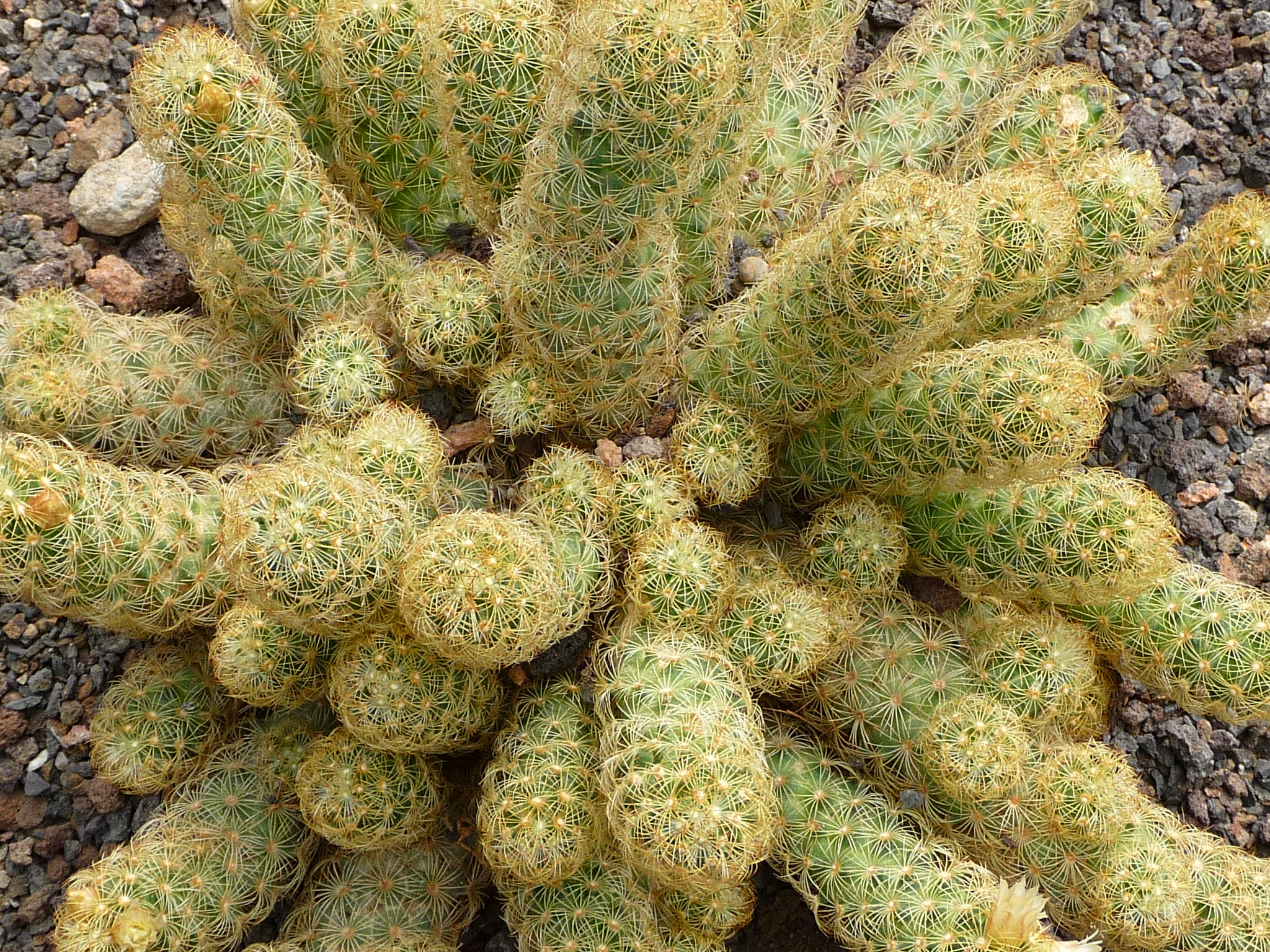
Mammillaria elongata

- Mammillaria Haw. – fishhook cactus, globe cactus, pincushion cactus, bird's-nest cactus

synonyms: Bartschella Britton & Rose, Cactus L., Chilita Orcutt, Cochemiea (K.Brandegee) Walton, Dolichothele (K.Schum.) Britton & Rose, Ebnerella Buxb., Haagea Fric, Krainzia Backeb., Lactomammillaria Fric (nom. inval.), Leptocladia Buxb., Leptocladodia Buxb., Mamillaria F.Rchb. (orth. var.), Mamillopsis (E.Morren) F.A.C.Weber ex Britton & Rose, Mammariella Shafer (nom. inval.), Mammilaria Torr. & A.Gray (orth. var.), Neomammillaria Britton & Rose, Oehmea Buxb., Phellosperma Britton & Rose, Porfiria Boed., Pseudomammillaria Buxb., Solisia Britton & Rose

- Neolloydia Britton & Rose

synonyms: Napina Fric (nom. inval.), Pseudosolisia Y.Itô (nom. inval.)

- Obregonia Fric
- Ortegocactus Alexander
- Pediocactus Britton & Rose – hedgehog cactus

synonyms: Navajoa Croizat, Pilocanthus B.W.Benson & Backeb.

- Pelecyphora C.Ehrenb.

synonyms: Encephalocarpus A.Berger

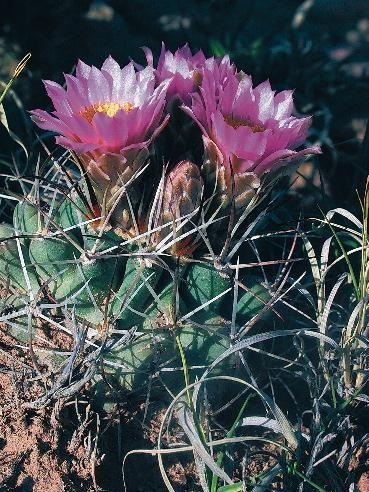
Sclerocactus glaucus

- Sclerocactus Britton & Rose – fishhook cactus

synonyms: Ancistrocactus Britton & Rose, Coloradoa Boissev. & C.Davidson, Glandulicactus Backeb., Toumeya Britton & Rose

- Stenocactus (K.Schum.) A.W.Hill

synonyms: Echinofossulocactus Britton & Rose, Efossus Orcutt (orth. var.)

- Strombocactus Britton & Rose
- Thelocactus (K.Schum.) Britton & Rose

synonyms: Hamatocactus Britton & Rose, Thelomastus Fric (nom. inval.)

- Turbinicarpus (Backeb.) Buxb. & Backeb. – top cactus

synonyms: Gymnocactus Backeb., Normanbokea Kladiwa & Buxb., Rapicactus Buxb. & Oehme

==== Tribe Calymmantheae ====
- Calymmanthium F.Ritter

synonyms: Diploperianthium F.Ritter (nom. inval.)

==== Tribe Cereeae ====
- Aylostera Speg.

synonyms: Digitorebutia Frič & Kreuz. ex Buining, Mediolobivia Backeb.

- Arrojadoa Britton & Rose

synonyms: Pierrebraunia Esteves

- Brasilicereus Backeb.
- Cereus Mill. – sweet potato cactus

synonyms: Mirabella F.Ritter, Piptanthocereus (A.Berger) Riccob., Subpilocereus Backeb.

- Cipocereus F.Ritter

synonyms: Floribunda F.Ritter

- Coleocephalocereus Backeb.

synonyms: Buiningia Buxb.

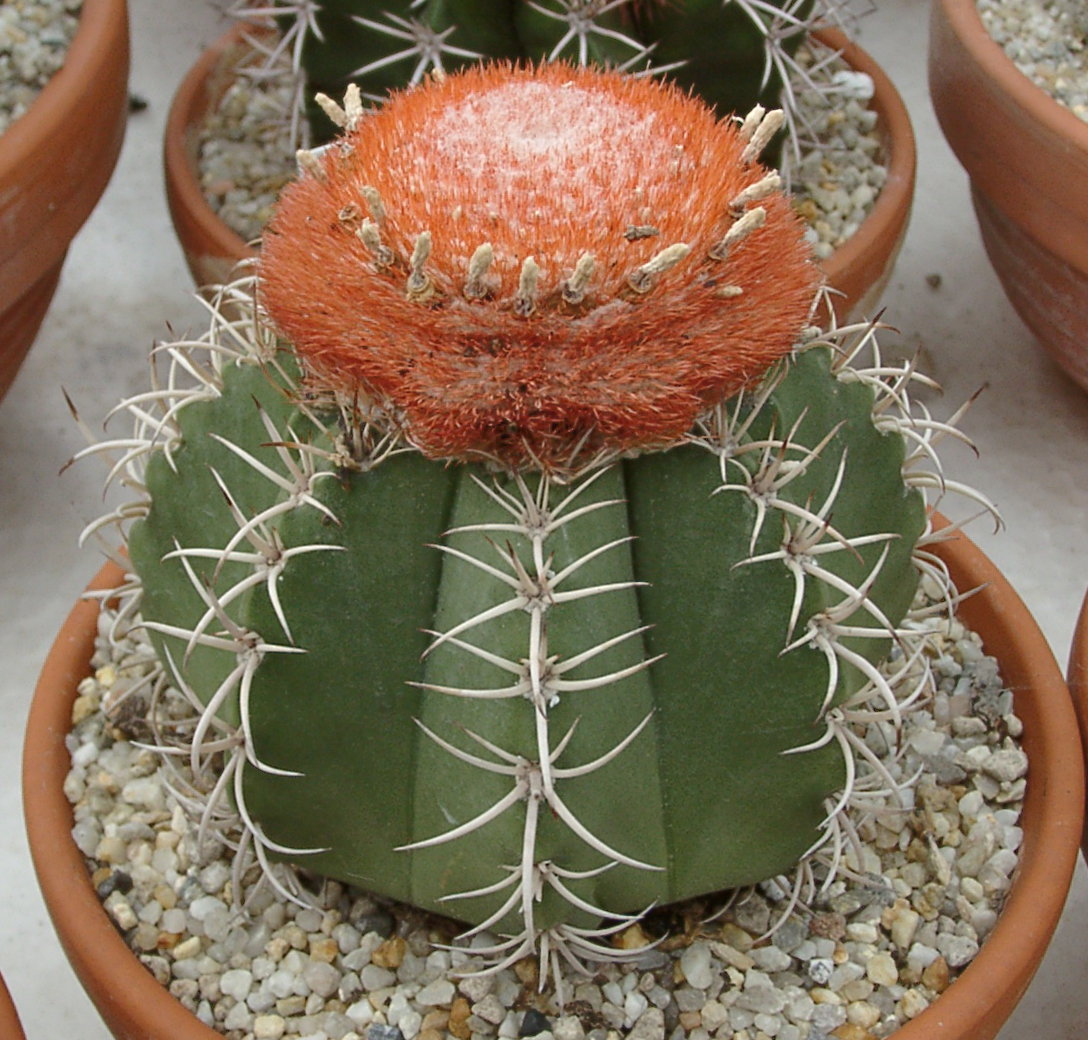
Melocactus matanzanus

- Melocactus Link & Otto

synonyms: Cactus Britton & Rose

- Micranthocereus Backeb.

synonyms: Austrocephalocereus Backeb., Siccobaccatus P.J.Braun & Esteves

- Pilosocereus Byles & G. D. Rowley – tree cactus

synonyms: Pilocereus K.Schum., Pseudopilocereus Buxb.

- Praecereus Buxb.
- Reicheocactus Backeb.
- Serrulatocereus Guiggi, synonym of Cereus
- Stephanocereus A.Berger
- Uebelmannia Buining

==== Tribe Hylocereeae ====
- Disocactus Lindl.

synonyms: Aporocactus Lem., Aporocereus Fric & Kreuz. (orth. var.), Bonifazia Standl. & Steyerm., Chiapasia Britton & Rose, Disisocactus Kunze (orth. var.), Disocereus Fric & Kreuz. (orth. var.), Heliocereus (A.Berger) Britton & Rose, Lobeira Alexander, Mediocereus Fric & Kreuz. (orth. var.), Nopalxochia Britton & Rose, Pseudonopalxochia Backeb., Trochilocactus Linding., Wittia K.Schum., Wittiocactus Rauschert

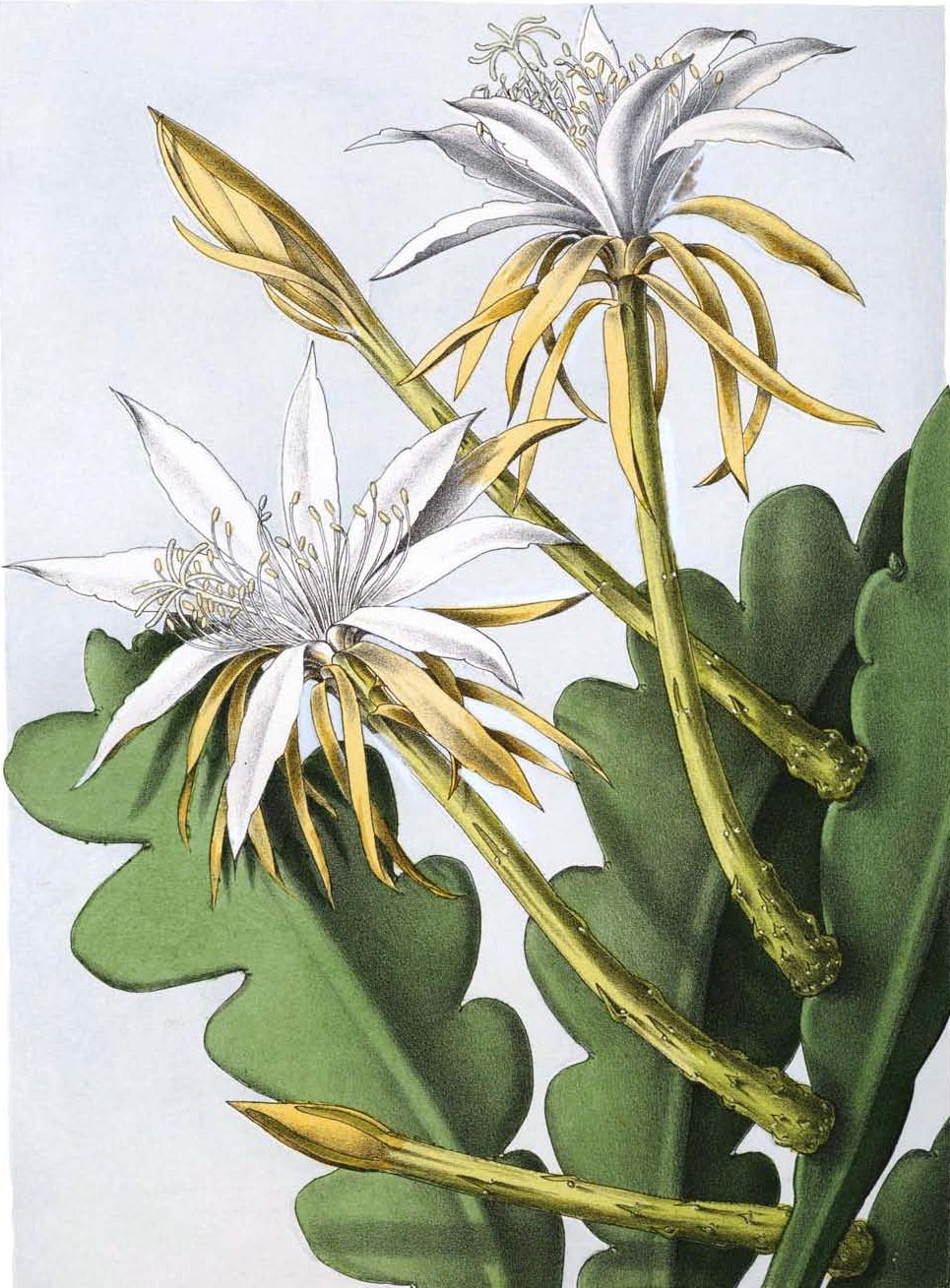
Epiphyllum anguliger

- Epiphyllum Haw. – climbing cactus

synonyms: Phyllocactus Link, Phyllocereus Miq.

- Hylocereus (A.Berger) Britton & Rose – nightblooming cactus

synonyms: Wilmattea Britton & Rose

- Pseudorhipsalis Britton & Rose
- Selenicereus (A.Berger) Britton & Rose – moonlight cactus, nightblooming cereus

synonyms: Cryptocereus Alexander, Deamia Britton & Rose, Marniera Backeb., Mediocactus Britton & Rose, Strophocactus Britton & Rose, Strophocereus Fric & Kreuz. (orth. var.)

- Weberocereus Britton & Rose

synonyms: Eccremocactus Britton & Rose, Eccremocereus Fric & Kreuz. (orth. var.), Werckleocereus Britton & Rose

==== Tribe Notocacteae ====
- Austrocactus Britton & Rose
- Blossfeldia Werderm.
- Cintia Kníže & Říha
- Copiapoa Britton & Rose

synonyms: Pilocopiapoa F.Ritter

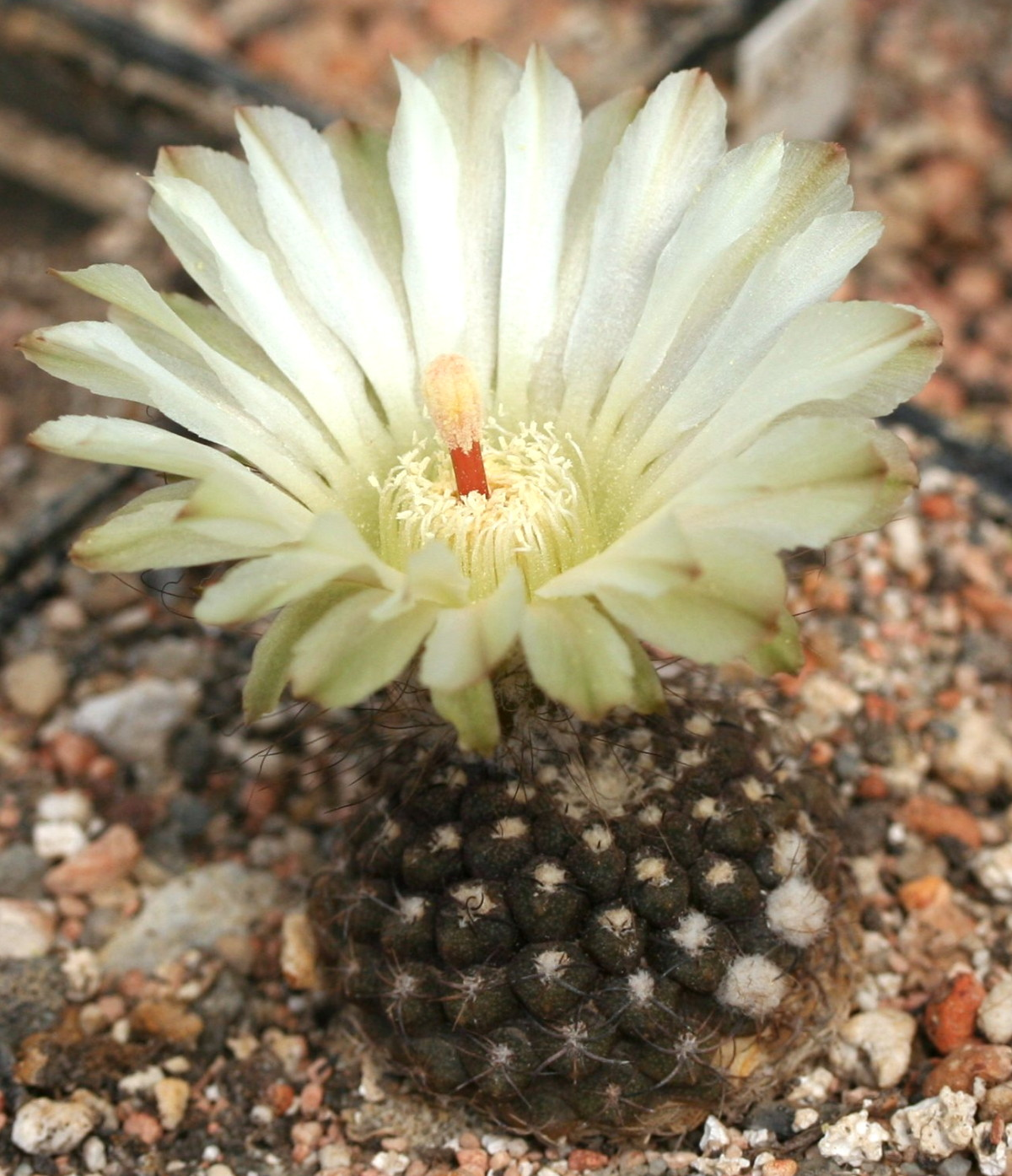
Eriosyce esmeraldana

- Eriosyce Phil.

synonyms: Ceratistes Labour. (nom. inval.), Chileniopsis Backeb., Chileocactus Fric (nom. inval.), Chileorebutia Fric (nom. inval.), Chiliorebutia Fric (orth. var.), Delaetia Backeb., Dracocactus Y.Itô (nom. inval.), Euporteria Kreuz. & Buining, Hildmannia Kreuz. & Buining, Horridocactus Backeb., Islaya Backeb., Neochilenia Backeb. ex Dölz, Neoporteria Britton & Rose, Neoporteria Backeb., Neotanahashia Y.Itô, Nichelia Bullock (nom. inval.), Pyrrhocactus (A.Berger) A.W.Hill, Rodentiophila F.Ritter ex Backeb., Thelocephala Y.Itô

- Eulychnia Phil.

synonyms: Philippicereus Backeb.

- Frailea Britton & Rose
- Neowerdermannia Fric
- Parodia Speg.

synonyms: Acanthocephala Backeb., Brasilicactus Backeb., Brasiliparodia F.Ritter, Brasilocactus Fric (nom. inval.), Chrysocactus Y.Itô (nom. inval.), Dactylanthocactus Y.Itô, Eriocactus Backeb., Eriocephala Backeb., Friesia Fric (nom. inval.), Hickenia Britton & Rose, Malacocarpus Salm-Dyck, Microspermia Fric, Neohickenia Fric, Notocactus (K.Schum.) Fric, Sericocactus Y.Itô, Wigginsia D.M.Porter

- Yavia R.Kiesling & Piltz

==== Tribe Pachycereeae ====
- Acanthocereus (Engelm. ex A.Berger) Britton & Rose – triangle cactus

synonyms: Dendrocereus Britton & Rose, Monvillea Britton & Rose

- Bergerocactus Britton & Rose – snake cactus

synonyms: Bergerocereus Fric & Kreuz. (orth. var.)

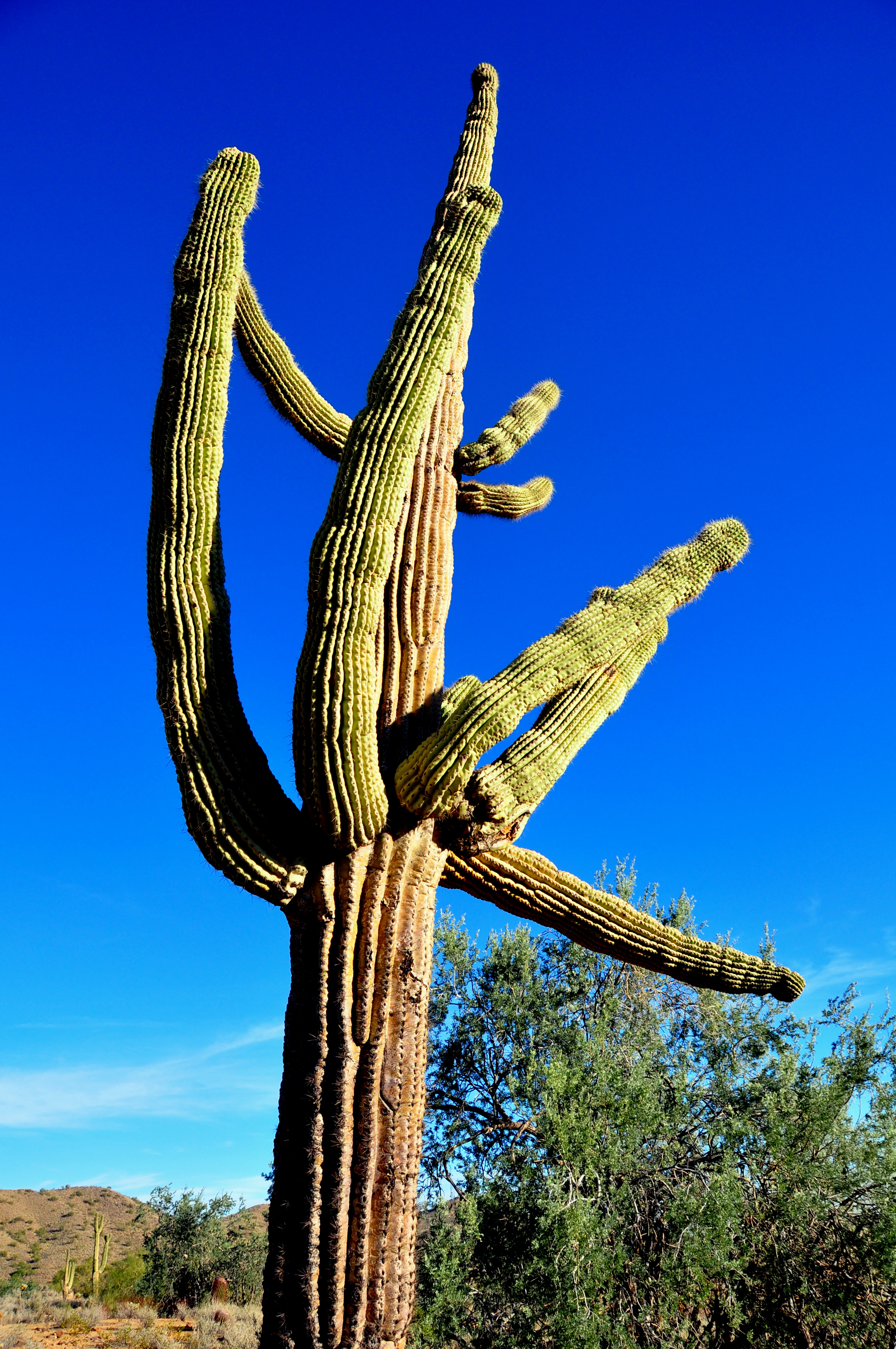
Carnegiea gigantea

- Carnegiea Britton & Rose – saguaro
- Cephalocereus Pfeiff. – old man cactus

synonyms: Haseltonia Backeb., Neodawsonia Backeb., Pilocereus Lem.

- Corryocactus Britton & Rose

synonym: Corryocereus Fric & Kreuz. (orth. var.), Erdisia Britton & Rose, Eulychnocactus Backeb. (nom. inval.)

- Dendrocereus Britton & Rose – see Acanthocereus
- Echinocereus Engelm. – hedgehog cactus

synonyms: Morangaya G.D.Rowley, Wilcoxia Britton & Rose

- Escontria Rose
- Isolatocereus Backeb. – see Stenocereus
- Leptocereus (A.Berger) Britton & Rose

synonyms: Neoabbottia Britton & Rose

- ×Myrtgerocactus Moran

[= Myrtillocactus × Bergerocactus]

- Myrtillocactus Console

synonyms: Myrtillocereus Fric & Kreuz. (orth. var.)

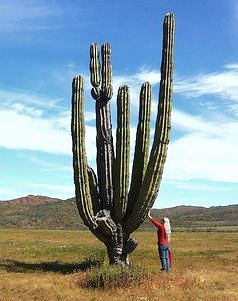
Pachycereus pringlei

- Neobuxbaumia Backeb.

synonyms: Pseudomitrocereus Bravo & Buxb., Rooksbya Backeb.

- ×Pacherocactus G.D.Rowley

[= Pachycereus × Bergerocactus]

- Pachycereus (A.Berger) Britton & Rose

synonyms: Backebergia Bravo, Lemaireocereus Britton & Rose, Lophocereus (A.Berger) Britton & Rose, Marginatocereus (Backeb.) Backeb., Mitrocereus (Backeb.) Backeb., Pterocereus T.MacDoug. & Miranda

- Peniocereus (A.Berger) Britton & Rose

synonyms: Cullmannia Distefano, Neoevansia W.T.Marshall, Nyctocereus (A.Berger) Britton & Rose

- Polaskia Backeb.

synonyms: Chichipia Backeb. (nom. inval.), Heliabravoa Backeb.

- Pseudoacanthocereus F.Ritter
- Stenocereus (A.Berger) Riccob.

synonyms: Hertrichocereus Backeb., Isolatocereus Backeb., Isolatocereus (Backeb.) Backeb., Machaerocereus Britton & Rose, Marshallocereus Backeb., Neolemaireocereus Backeb., Rathbunia Britton & Rose, Ritterocereus Backeb.

==== Tribe Rhipsalideae ====
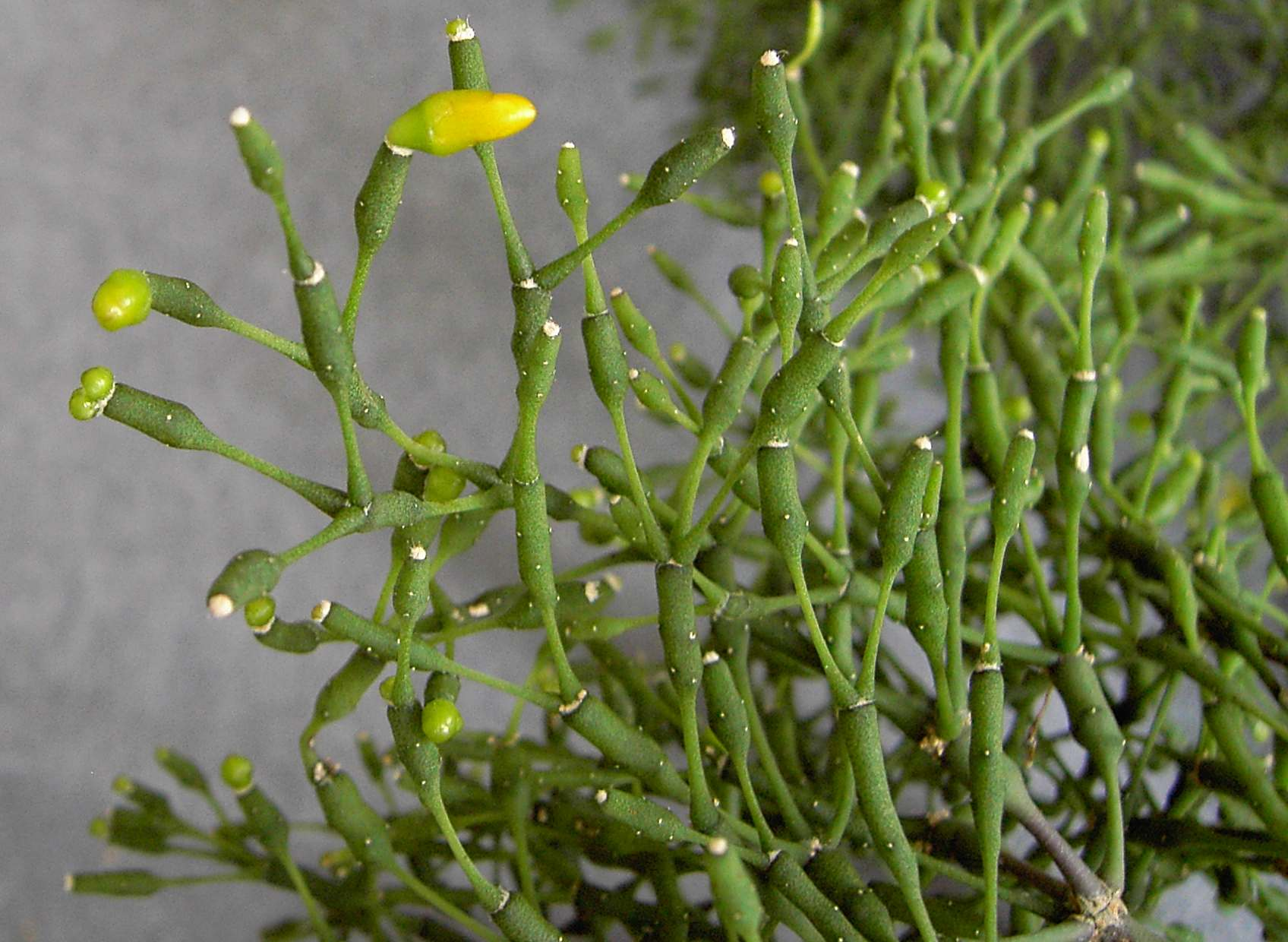
Hatiora salicornioides

- Hatiora Britton & Rose

synonyms: Epiphyllopsis Backeb. & F.M.Knuth, Hariota DC., Pseudozygocactus Backeb., Rhipsalidopsis Britton & Rose

- Lepismium Pfeiff.

synonyms: Acanthorhipsalis (K.Schum.) Britton & Rose, Acanthorhipsalis Kimnach, Pfeiffera Salm-Dyck

- Rhipsalis Gaertn.

synonyms: Cassytha Mill., Erythrorhipsalis A.Berger, Hariota Adans., Lymanbensonia Kimnach

- Schlumbergera Lem. – Christmas cactus, Easter cactus

synonyms: Epiphyllanthus A.Berger, Epiphyllum Pfeiff., Opuntiopsis Knebel (nom. inval.), Zygocactus K.Schum., Zygocereus Fric & Kreuz. (orth. var.)

==== Tribe Trichocereeae ====
- Acanthocalycium Backeb.

synonyms: Spinicalycium Fric (nom. inval.)

- Arthrocereus A.Berger
- Brachycereus Britton & Rose

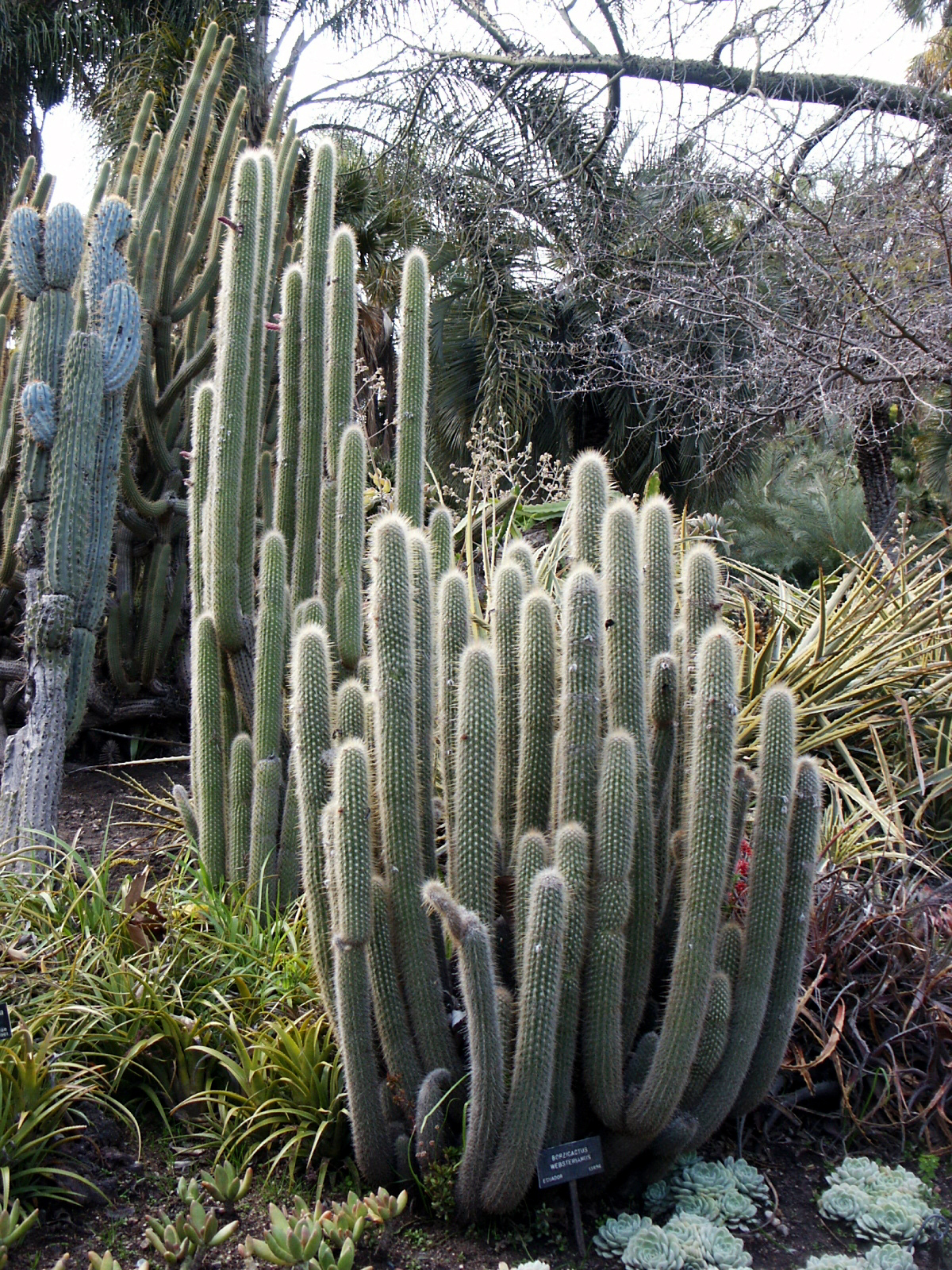
Cleistocactus

- Cleistocactus Lem.

synonyms: Akersia Buining, Bolivicereus Cárdenas, Borzicactella H.Johnson ex F.Ritter, Borzicactus Riccob, Borzicereus Fric & Kreuz. (orth. var.), Cephalocleistocactus F.Ritter, Cleistocereus Fric & Kreuz. (orth. var.), Clistanthocereus Backeb., Demnosa Fric, Gymnanthocereus Backeb., Hildewintera F.Ritter, Loxanthocereus Backeb., Maritimocereus Akers, Pseudoechinocereus Buining (nom. inval.), Seticereus Backeb., Seticleistocactus Backeb., Winteria F.Ritter, Winterocereus Backeb.

- Cephalocleistocactus F.Ritter – see Cleistocactus
- Denmoza Britton & Rose
- Discocactus Pfeiff.
- Echinopsis Zucc. – San Pedro cactus

synonyms: Acantholobivia Backeb., Acanthopetalus Y.Itô, Andenea Fric (nom. inval.), Aureilobivia Fric, nom. inval., Chamaecereus Britton & Rose, Chamaelobivia Y. Itô (nom. inval.), Cinnabarinea Fric ex F.Ritter, Echinolobivia Y.Itô (nom. inval.), Echinonyctanthus Lem., Furiolobivia Y.Itô (nom. inval.), Helianthocereus Backeb, Heterolobivia Y.Itô (nom. inval.), Hymenorebulobivia Fric (nom. inval.), Hymenorebutia Fric ex Buining, Leucostele Backeb., Lobirebutia Fric (nom. inval.), Lobivia Britton & Rose, Lobiviopsis Fric (nom. inval.), Megalobivia Y.Itô (nom. inval.), Mesechinopsis Y.Itô, Neolobivia Y.Itô, Pilopsis Y.Itô (nom. inval.), Pseudolobivia (Backeb.) Backeb., Rebulobivia Fric (nom. inval.), Salpingolobivia Y.Itô, Scoparebutia Fric & Kreuz. ex Buining, Setiechinopsis (Backeb.) de Haas, Soehrensia Backeb., Trichocereus (A.Berger) Riccob.

- Espostoa Britton & Rose

synonyms: Binghamia Britton & Rose, Pseudoespostoa Backeb., Thrixanthocereus Backeb.,

- Espostoopsis Buxb.

synonyms: Gerocephalus F.Ritter

- Facheiroa Britton & Rose

synonyms: Zehntnerella Britton & Rose

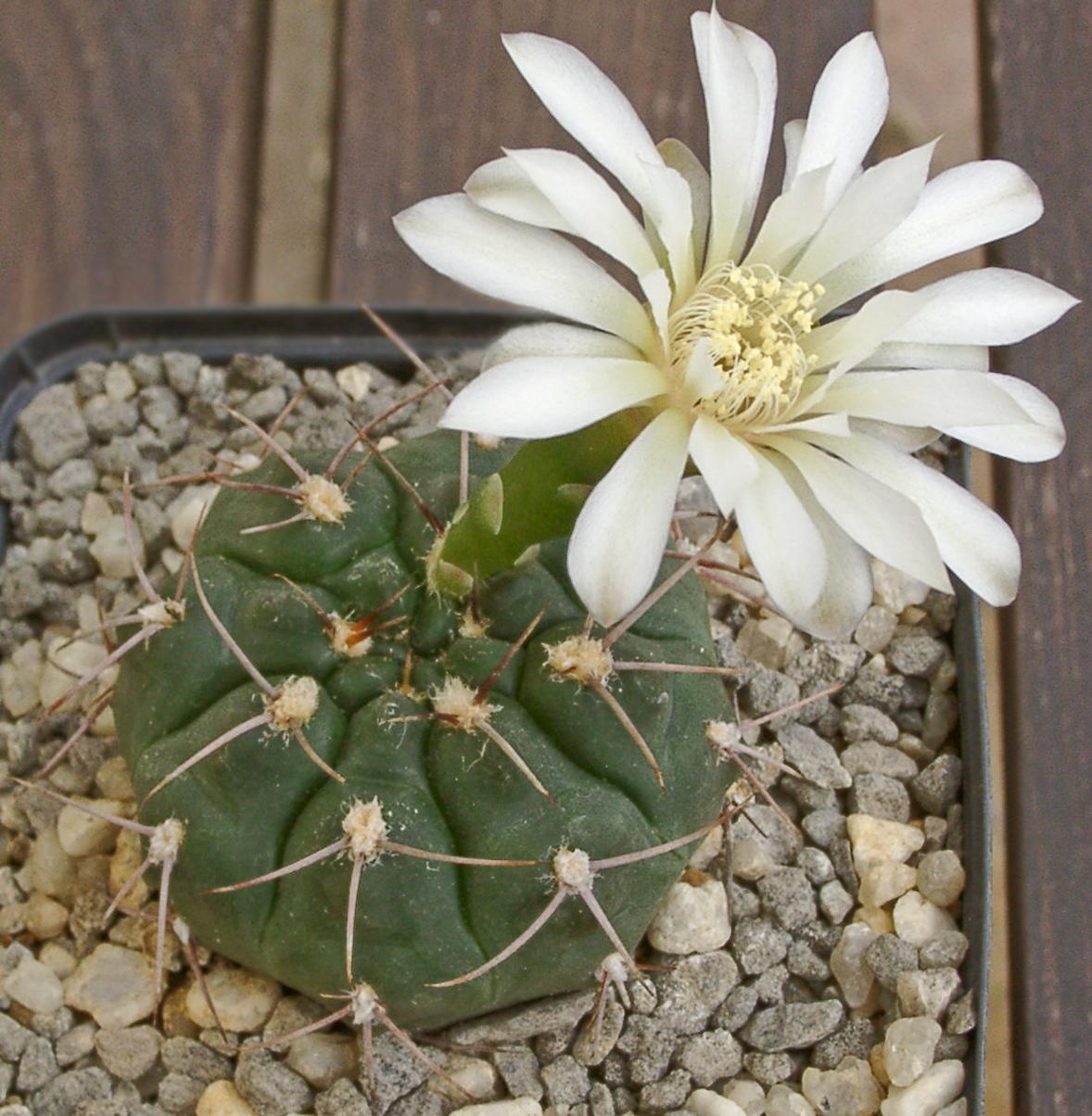
Gymnocalycium moserianum

- Gymnocalycium Pfeiff. ex Mittler – chin cactus

synonyms: Brachycalycium Backeb.

- Haageocereus Backeb.

synonyms: Floresia Krainz & F.Ritter ex Backeb. (nom. inval.), Haageocactus Backeb. (nom. inval.), Lasiocereus F.Ritter, Neobinghamia Backeb., Peruvocereus Akers

- × Haagespostoa G.D.Rowley

[= Haageocereus × Espostoa]

- Harrisia Britton – apple cactus

synonyms: Eriocereus (A.Berger) Riccob., Roseocereus Backeb.

- Lasiocereus F.Ritter – see Haageocereus
- Leocereus Britton & Rose – see Facheiroa
- Matucana Britton & Rose

synonyms: Eomatucana F.Ritter

- Mila Britton & Rose
- Oreocereus (A.Berger) Riccob.

synonyms: Arequipa Britton & Rose, Arequipiopsis Kreuz. & Buining, Morawetzia Backeb., Submatucana Backeb.

- Oroya Britton & Rose
- Pygmaeocereus H.Johnson & Backeb.
- Rauhocereus Backeb.

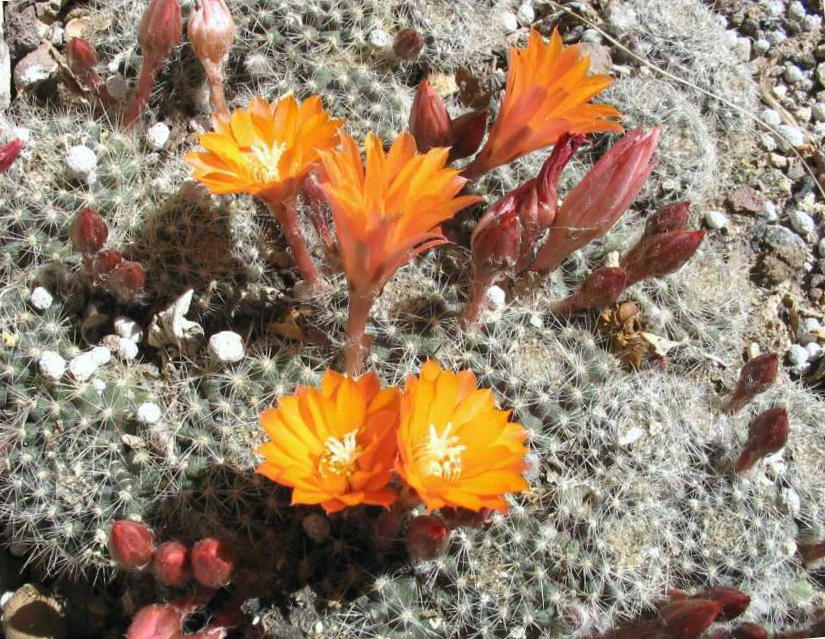
Rebutia flavistyla

- Rebutia K.Schum.

synonyms: Aylostera Speg., Bridgesia Backeb., Cylindrorebutia Fric & Kreuz., Digitorebutia Fric & Kreuz., Echinorebutia Fric (nom. inval.), Eurebutia Fric (nom. inval.), Gymnantha Y.Itô, Mediolobivia Backeb., Mediorebutia Fric (nom. inval.), Neogymnantha Y.Itô, Reicheocactus Backeb., Setirebutia Fric & Kreuz. (nom. inval.), Spegazzinia Backeb., Sulcorebutia Backeb., Weingartia Werderm.

- Weberbauerocereus Backeb.

synonyms: Meyenia Backeb.

- Vatricania Backeb.

== Bibliography ==
- Anderson, Edward F. (2001), The Cactus Family, Pentland, Oregon: Timber Press, ISBN 978-0-88192-498-5
