= Oehme =

Oehme is a German surname. Notable people with the surname include:

- Felix Oehme (born 1981), German yachtsman
- Franziska Oehme (born 1944), German actress
- Ernst Erwin Oehme (1831-1907), German painter
- Ernst Ferdinand Oehme (1797-1855), German painter
- Reinhard Oehme (1928-2010), German-American physicist
- Ulrich Oehme (born 1960), German politician
- Wolfgang Oehme (1930-2011), German-American landscape architect
- Bobby Max Oehme (1964-present) American Entertainer
