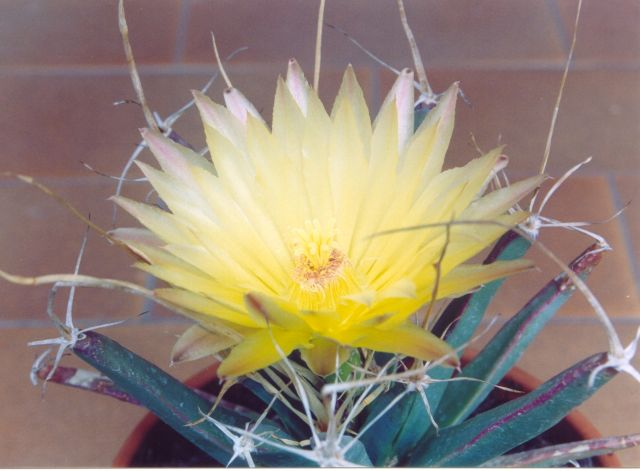

Conservation status
- Least Concern (IUCN 3.1)

Scientific classification
- Kingdom: Plantae
- Clade: Tracheophytes
- Clade: Angiosperms
- Clade: Eudicots
- Order: Caryophyllales
- Family: Cactaceae
- Subfamily: Cactoideae
- Genus: Leuchtenbergia; Hook.
- Species: L. principis

Binomial name
- Leuchtenbergia principis Fisch. ex Hook.

= Leuchtenbergia =

Agave cactus

Genus of cacti

Leuchtenbergia is a genus of cactus which has only one species, Leuchtenbergia principis (agave cactus or prism cactus). It is native to north-central Mexico (San Luis Potosi, Chihuahua). The genus is named after Maximilian Eugen Joseph (1817–1852), Duke of Leuchtenberg and amateur botanist.

== Description ==
It is very slow-growing, grow individually, sprouts only occasionally and reaches heights of 20 to 70 cm high, with a cylindrical stem which becomes bare and corky at the base with age, sprouts only occasionally and reaches heights of 20 to 35 cm (7.9 to 13.8 in) (rarely up to 70 cm (28 in)). The roots are large and fleshy, the shoots spherical to briefly cylindrical. It has long, slender, grayish-green tubercles 6–12 cm long, with purplish-red blotches at their tips. The tubercles are topped with papery spines, making the plant resemble an agave; old, basal tubercles dry up and fall off. After four years or so, yellow, fragrant, funnel-shaped flowers 5–6 cm diameter may be borne at the tubercle tips at the end of the areoles near the body and open during the day. Their pericarpel is scaled. The egg-shaped to oblong fruits are dry when ripe. The fruit is smooth and green, 3 cm long and 2 cm broad. It has a large, tuberous taproot. They contain broadly oval, black to brown seeds 2.4 mm (0.094 in) long and 2 mm (0.079 in) in diameter.

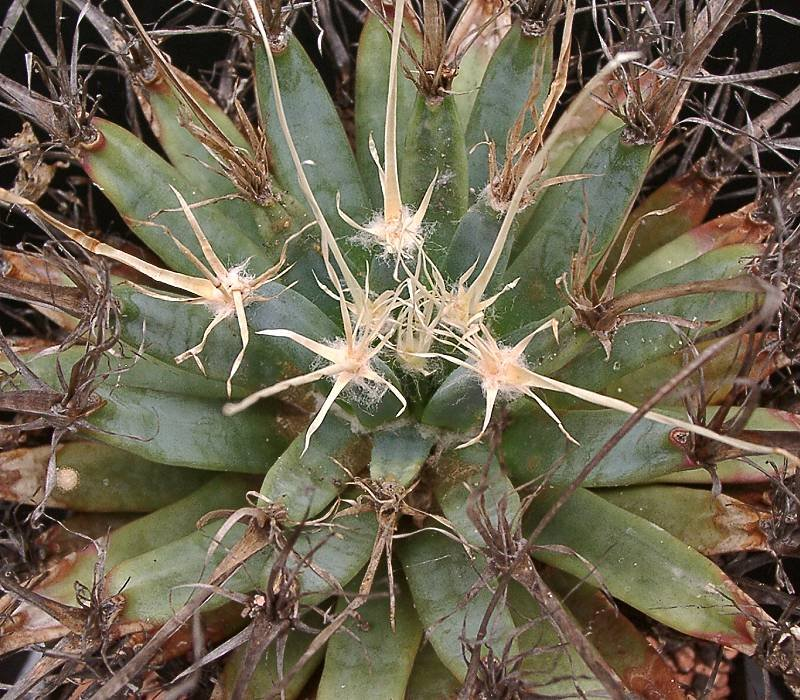
Plant

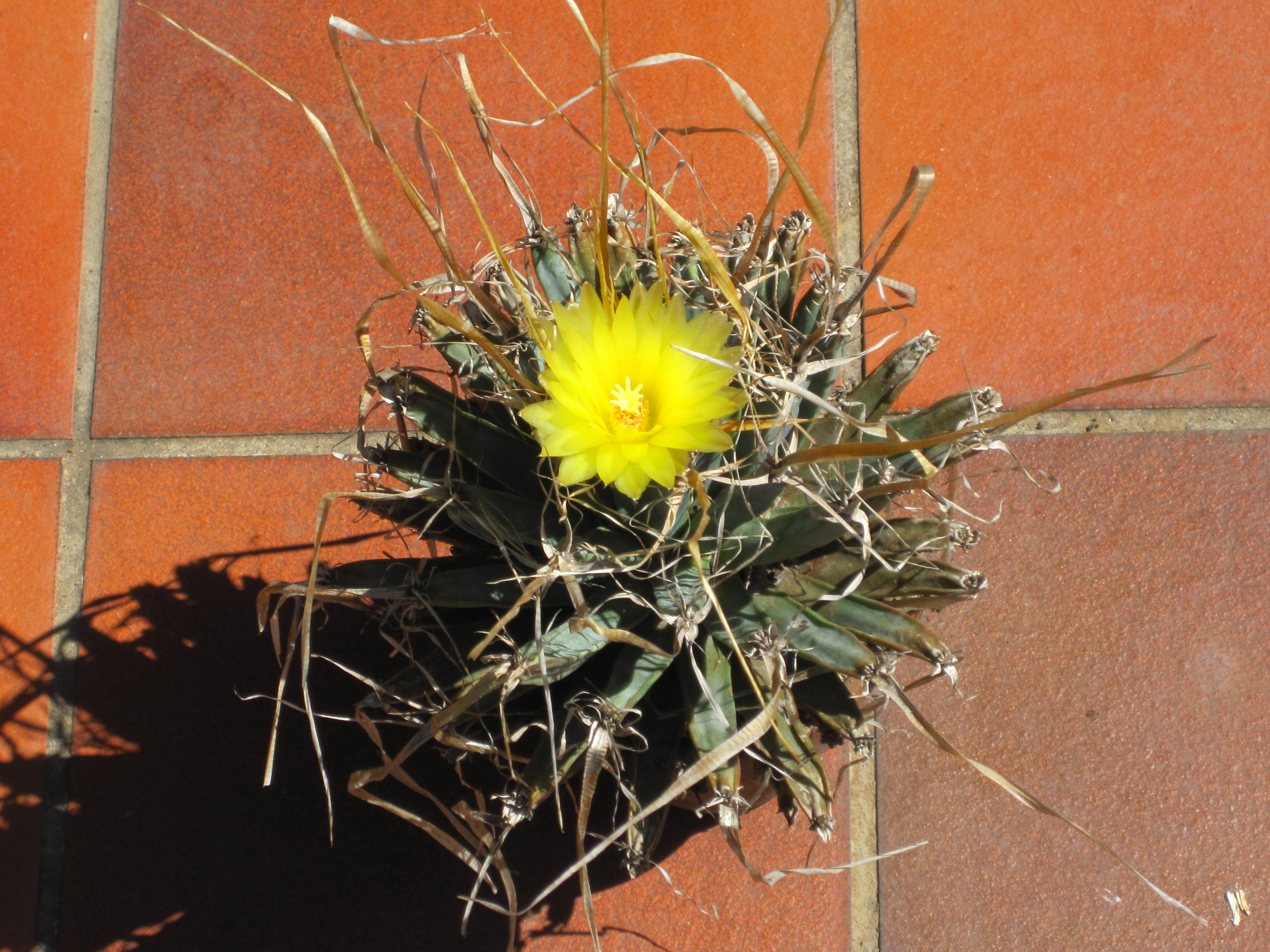
Leuchtenbergia principis seen from above

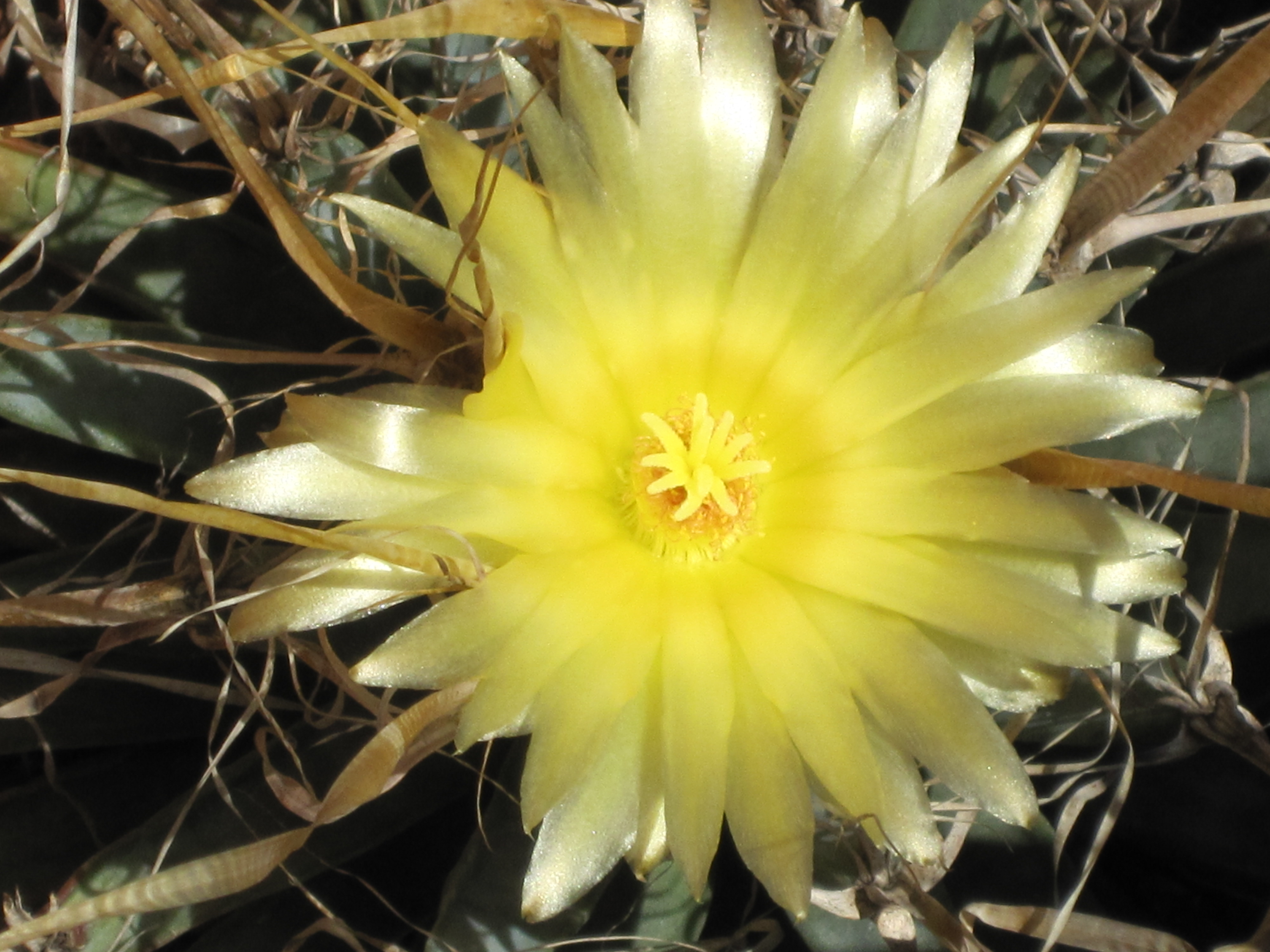
The flower

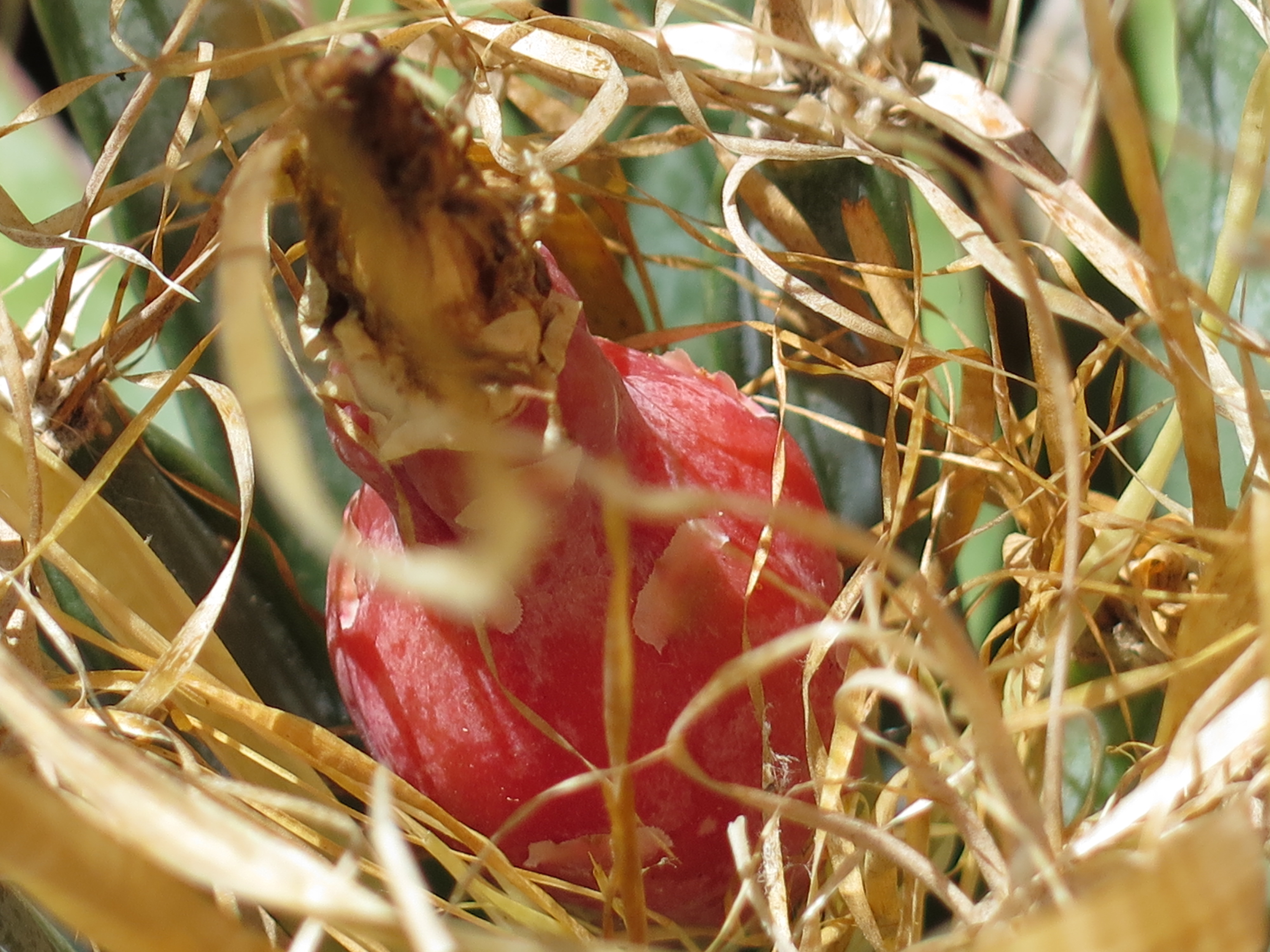
The fruit

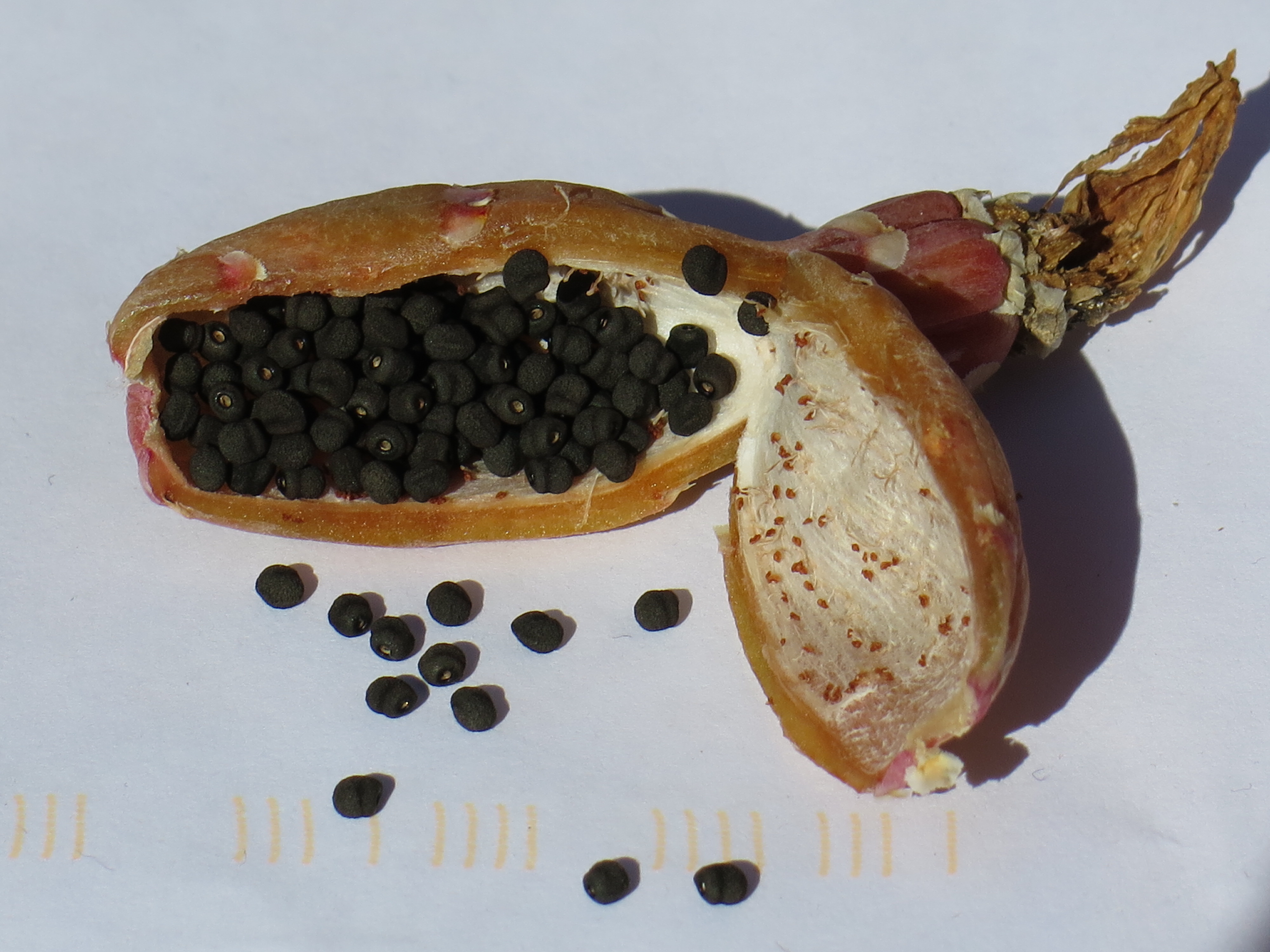
Seeds

== Distribution ==
Leuchtenbergia principis is distributed in the Mexican states of Coahuila, Guanajuato, Hidalgo, Nuevo León, San Luis Potosi, Tamaulipas and Zacatecas in the vegetation of the Chihuahuan Desert on limestone soils.

== Taxonomy ==
Leuchtenbergia principis was first described in 1848 by William Jackson Hooker. The botanical name honors the 3rd Duke of Leuchtenberg Maximilian de Beauharnais. William Jackson Hooker may have adopted the name Leuchtenbergia principis from Friedrich Ernst Ludwig von Fischer, who was director of the Saint Petersburg Botanical Garden from 1823 to 1850.

It is related to the genus Ferocactus, and hybrids have been created between these two genera.

Leuchtenbergia principis had been found in European collections since 1846. Soon after Hooker's description, it appears to have not been cultivated for some time and was considered a rarity. However, around the beginning of the 20th century, Leuchtenbergia principis was again fairly widespread in Europe. Leuchtenbergia principis was listed in Appendix I of the Convention on International Trade in Endangered Species of Wild Fauna and Flora in 1992.

== See also ==
- Agave
