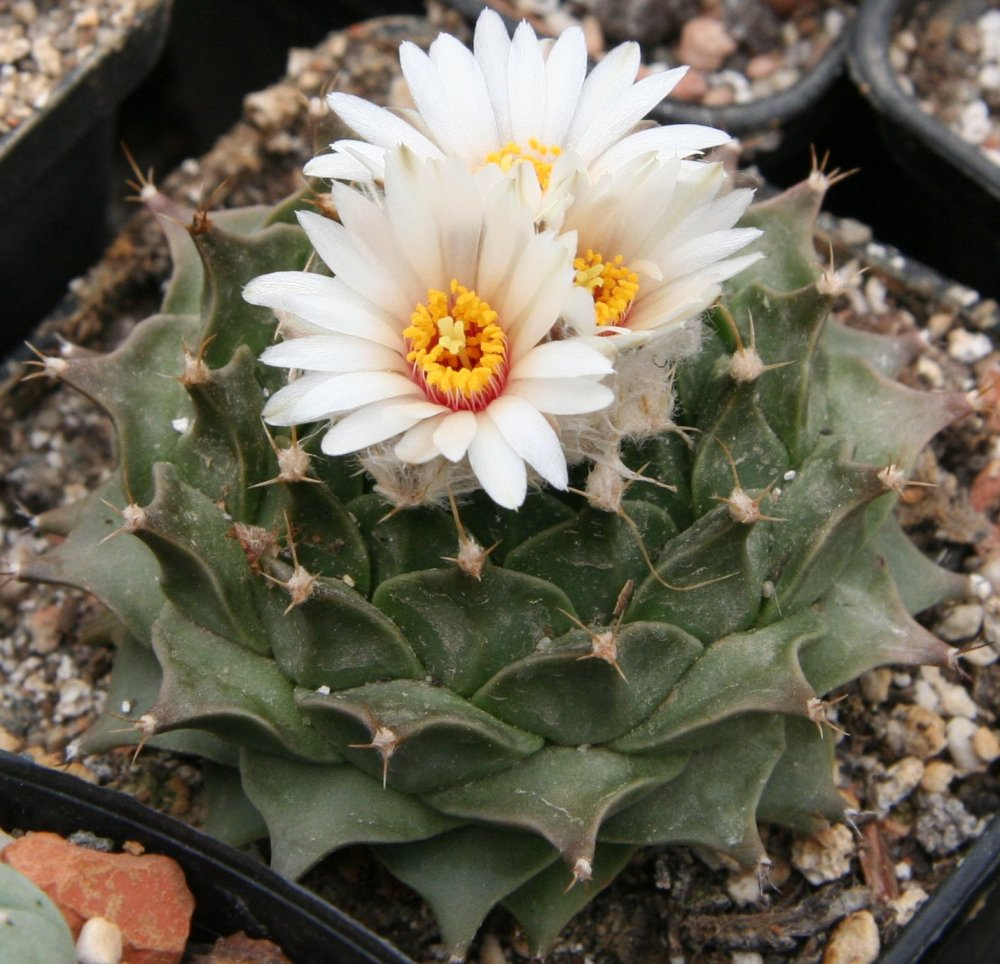

Conservation status
- Endangered (IUCN 3.1)
- CITES Appendix I

Scientific classification
- Kingdom: Plantae
- Clade: Tracheophytes
- Clade: Angiosperms
- Clade: Eudicots
- Order: Caryophyllales
- Family: Cactaceae
- Subfamily: Cactoideae
- Genus: Obregonia; Fric
- Species: O. denegrii

Binomial name
- Obregonia denegrii Fric

Synonyms
- Ariocarpus denegrii (Fric) Marshall; Strombocactus denegrii (Fric) Rowley

= Obregonia =

Genus of cacti

Obregonia, the artichoke cactus, is a monotypic genus of cacti, containing the species Obregonia denegrii. The species is endemic to the state of Tamaulipas in Mexico.

The genus Obregonia is named after Álvaro Obregón, while the species is named after Ramon P. De Negri, who was the Minister of Agriculture of Mexico when the cactus was first described by Alfred Frec in 1923.

== Description ==
Obregonia denegrii typically grows as a single plant, characterized by a sunken and woolly apex. This rare species resembles an inverted green pine cone with a woolly center. The stems take on a globular-squashed form with a woolly center, reaching diameters of up to 15 cm (5.9 in) and showcasing a color spectrum from greyish green to dark green. Small areoles are situated at the tips of the tubercles, adorned with wool in their early stages. The areoles exhibit 2 to 4 whitish to brown spines, measuring approximately 5 to 15 mm (0.20 to 0.59 in) in length, on the young tubercles. These spines are soft, flexible, slightly curved, and tend to shed rapidly. In the summer, flowers bloom, emerging between the wool of the apex and at the center of the stem on young tubercles. These flowers take on a funnel-shaped, diurnal, white appearance, with dimensions reaching up to 2.5 cm (0.98 in) in diameter and 2.5-3 cm (1.2 in) in length. The external perianth segments exhibit a greyish hue, and the pericarpel is either exposed or possesses a few scales. Filaments are reddish-purple or pink, anthers are yellow, and both the style and stigma lobes are white.

== Distribution ==
Obregonia denegrii originates from the Valley of Jaumave in Ciudad Victoria, Tamaulipas, Mexico, commonly thriving at elevations around 1000 meters. This plant prospers in semi-desert open areas and dense bushes. It grows slowly in culture and requires little water. It benefits from full sun and is multiplied by seed. It is very slow growing.

It is assessed as endangered on the IUCN Red List .

== Uses ==
The Nahuatl Indians call the plant peyotl, and it is said to have hallucinogenic alkaloids. It is one of the closest living relatives of the genus Lophophora.

== Gallery ==
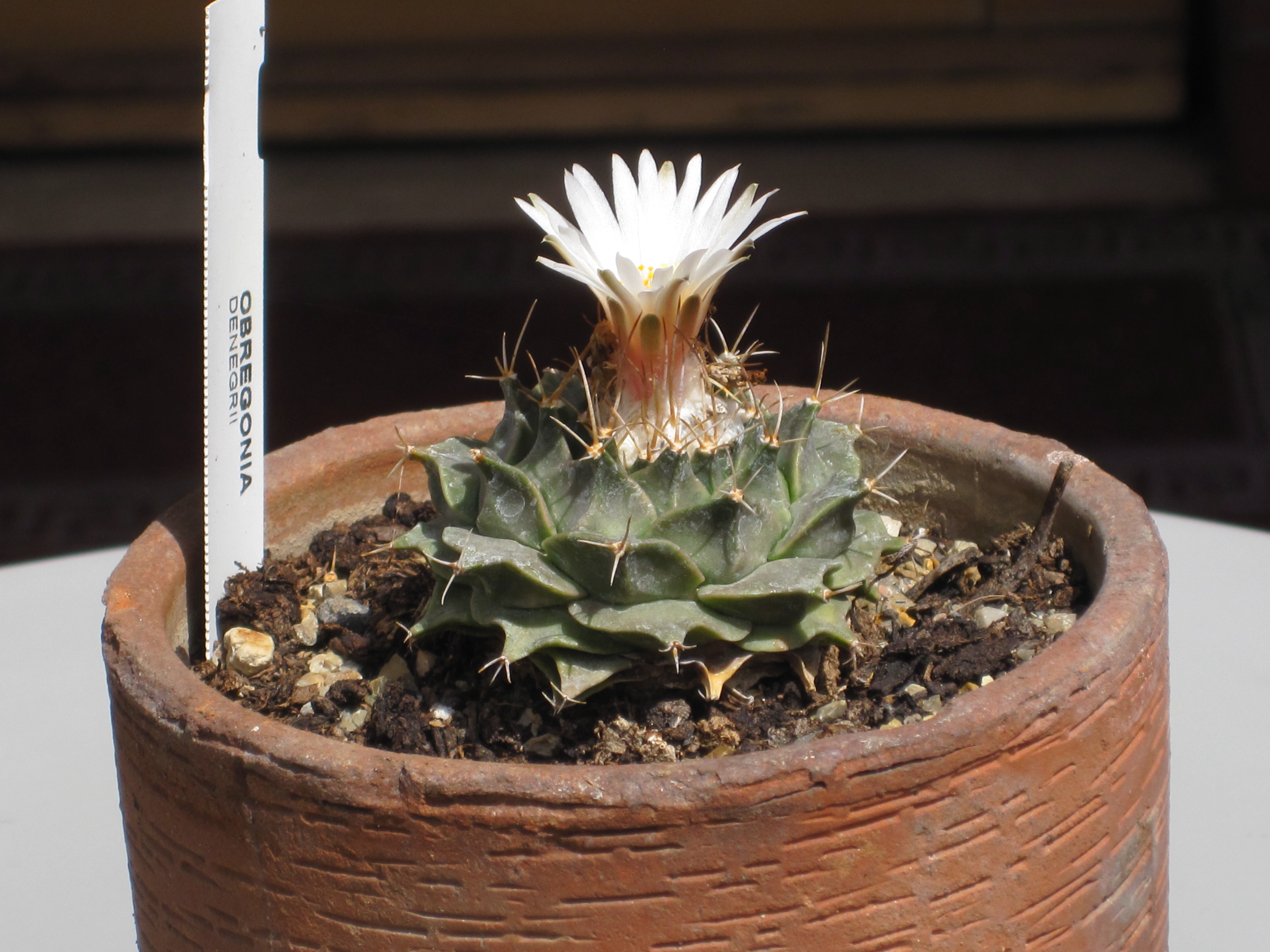
Obregonia denigrii in flower

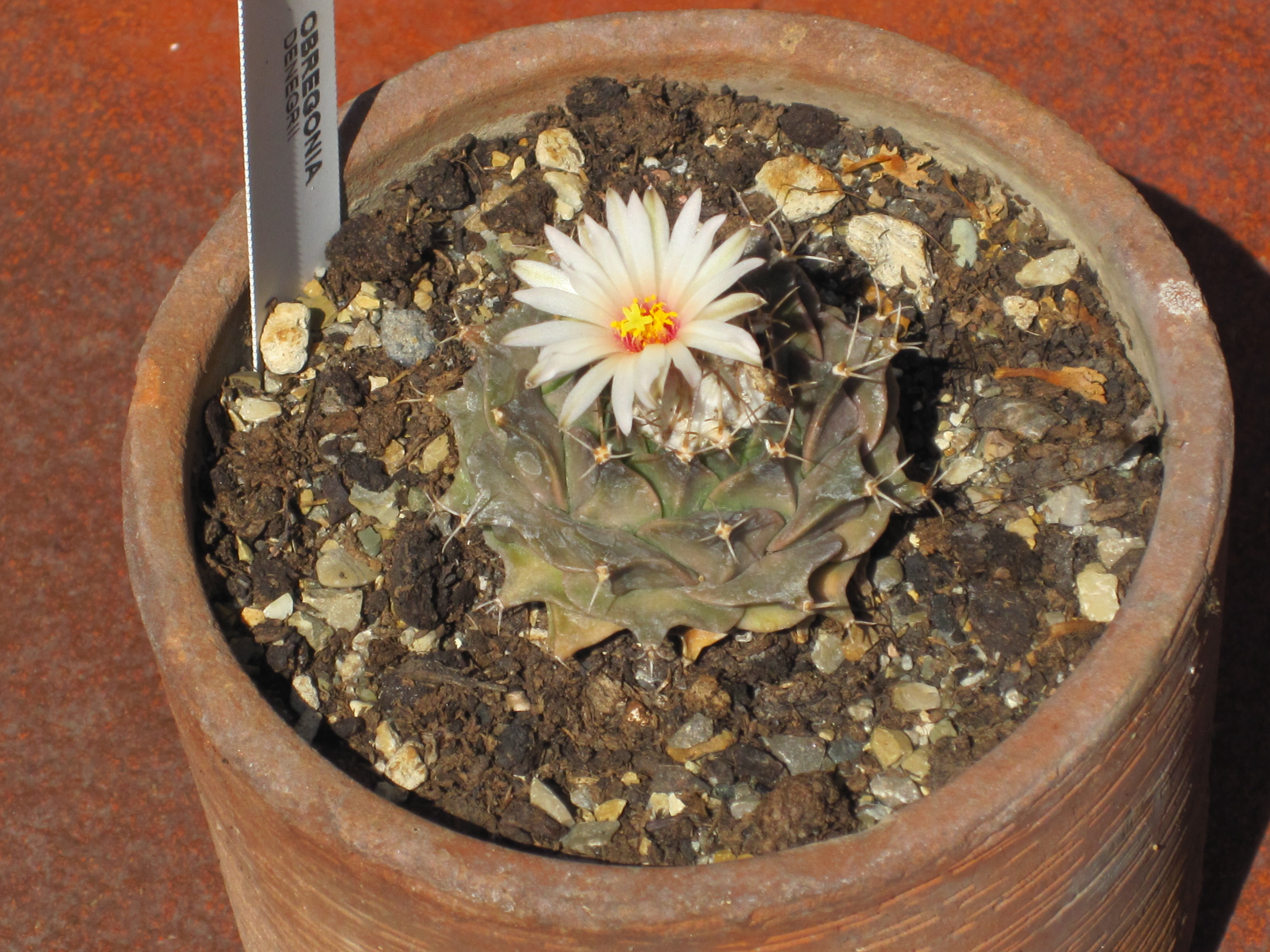
Obregonia denigrii seen from above

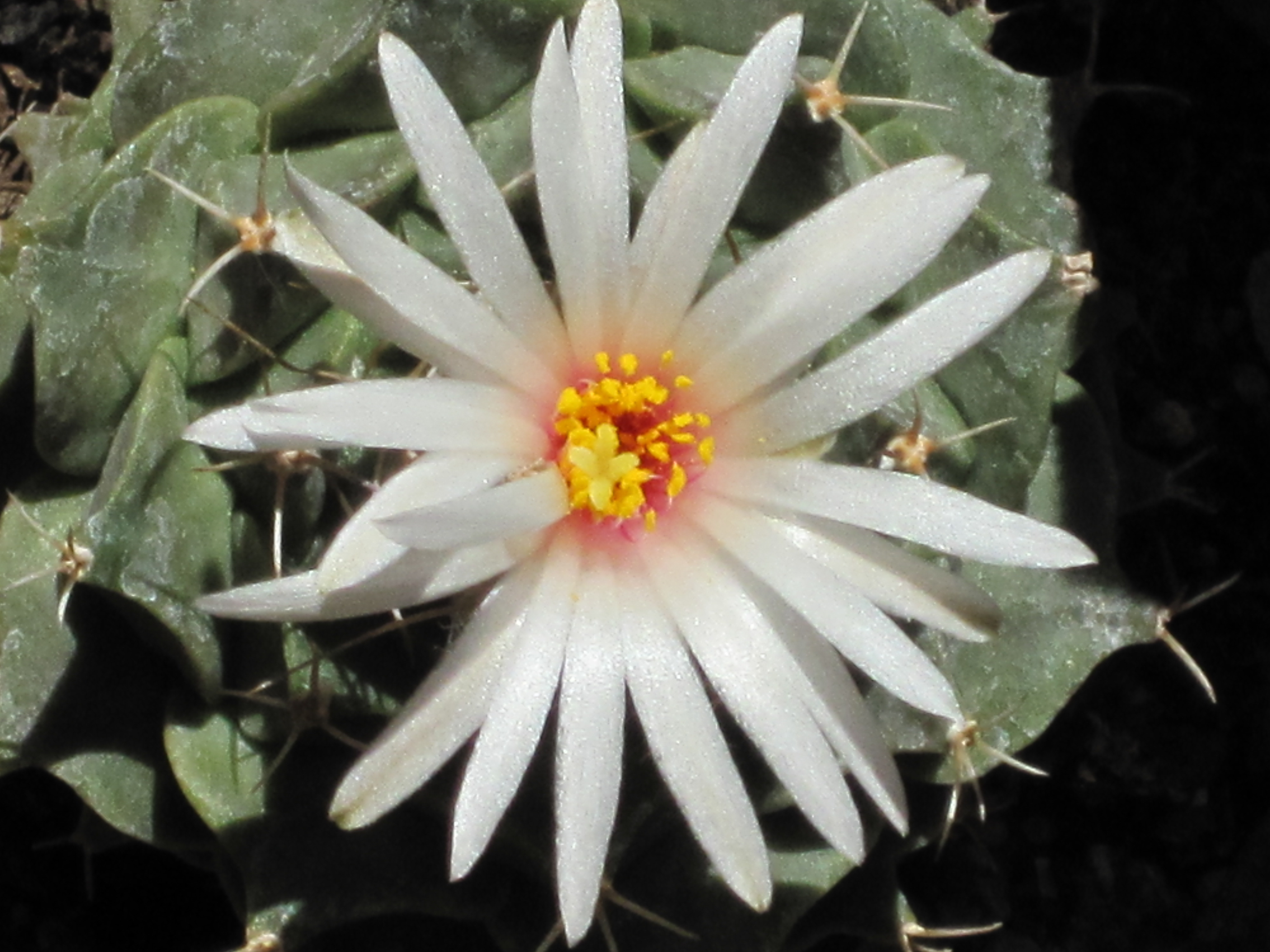
The flower of Obregonia denigrii

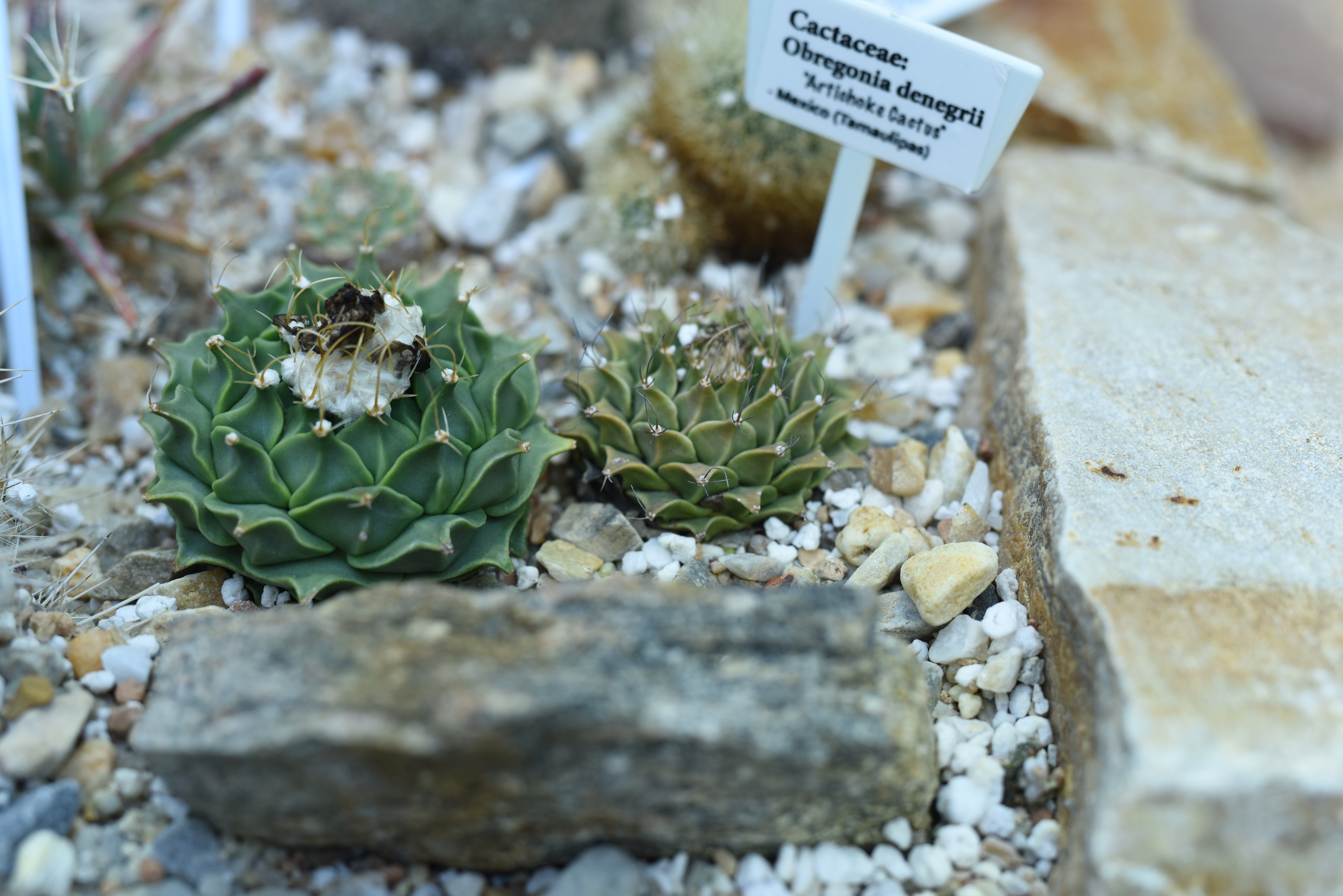
Cultivated plant specimen
