= Mittler =

Mittler is a surname. Notable people with the surname include:

- Barbara Mittler (born 1968), German sinologist
- Franz Mittler (1893–1970), Austrian-born American composer, musician, and humorist
- Leo Mittler (1893–1958), Austrian playwright, screenwriter and film director
- Thomas E. Mittler (1928–2012), Austrian entomologist
- Wolf Mittler (1918–2002), German radio host and journalist
