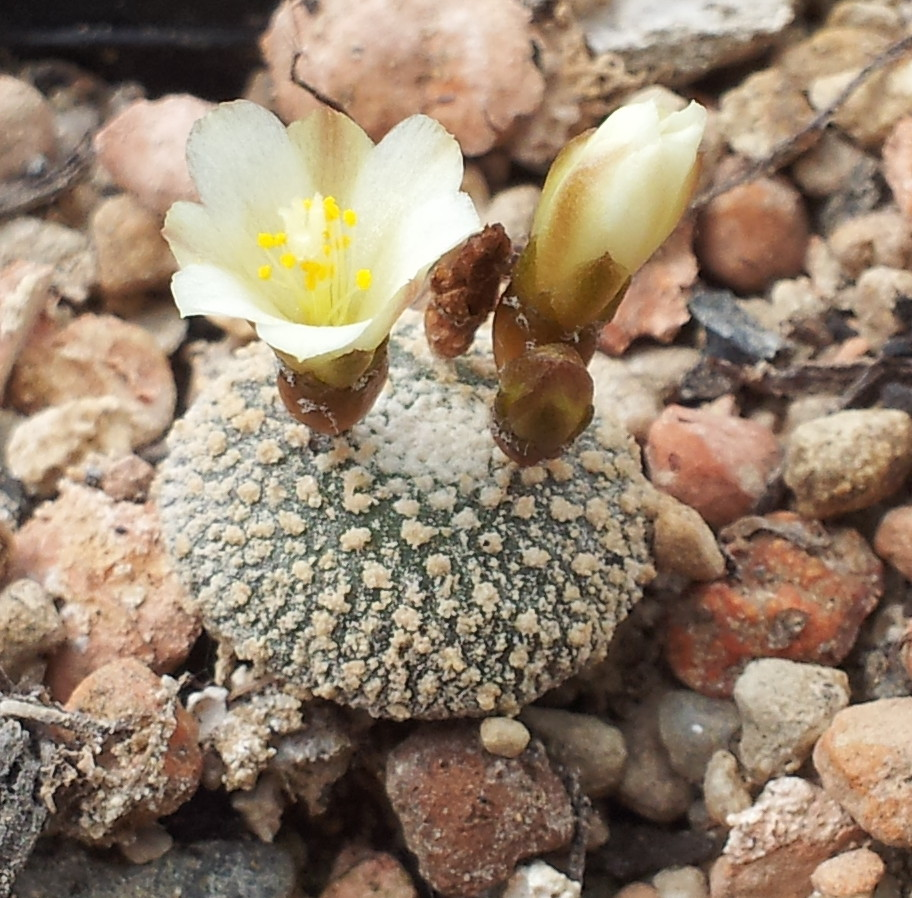

Scientific classification
- Kingdom: Plantae
- Clade: Embryophytes
- Clade: Tracheophytes
- Clade: Angiosperms
- Clade: Eudicots
- Order: Caryophyllales
- Family: Cactaceae
- Subfamily: Cactoideae
- Tribe: Blossfeldieae; Crozier
- Genus: Blossfeldia; Werderm.
- Species: B. liliputana

Binomial name
- Blossfeldia liliputana Werderm.

Synonyms
- Blossfeldia atroviridis F.Ritter; Blossfeldia campaniflora Backeb. nom. inval.; Blossfeldia cryptocarpa (R.Kiesling & Piltz) Halda; Blossfeldia fechseri Backeb. nom. inval.; Blossfeldia minima F.Ritter; Blossfeldia pedicellata F.Ritter; Parodia liliputana (Werderm.) N.P. Taylor

= Blossfeldia =

Genus of cacti

Blossfeldia is a genus of cacti (family Cactaceae) containing only one species, Blossfeldia liliputana, native to South America in northwestern Argentina (Jujuy, Salta, Tucumán, Catamarca and Mendoza Provinces) and southern Bolivia (Santa Cruz and Potosí Departments). It grows at 1,200–3,500 m altitude in the Andes, typically growing in rock crevices, and often close to waterfalls.

== Description ==
It is the smallest cactus species in the world, with a mature size around 10–12 mm diameter, solitary or with many dark-green stems forming colonies in the fissures of the rocks; it does not have ribs or tubercles, nor spines. The flowers are white or rarely pink, 6–15 mm long, and 5–7 mm diameter.

The genus Blossfeldia has been divided into many separate species, but most morphological evidence indicates the genus to be monotypic, and contains only B. liliputiana. The flowers emerge from the apex of the stem, 0.5 to 1 cm long and 0.5 cm in diameter, white. They self-pollinate. The fruit is globose, red, and woolly, with very small, brown seeds.

The species is named after the fictional country of Lilliput, where all of the inhabitants are minute.

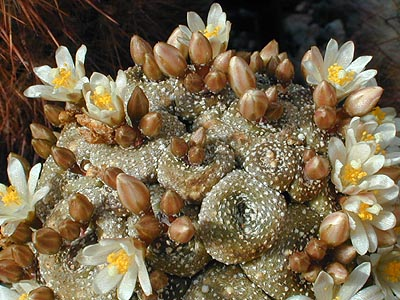

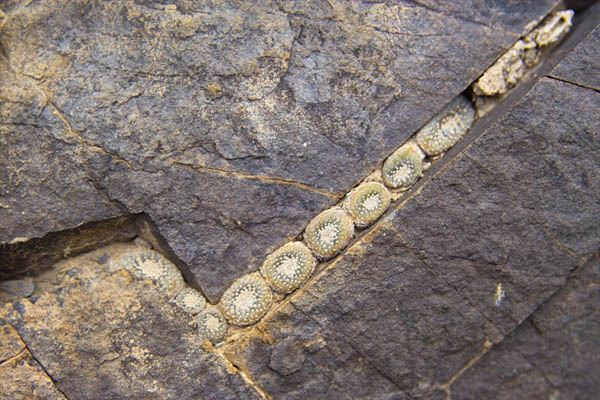
Plant growing in between rocks in Purmamarca

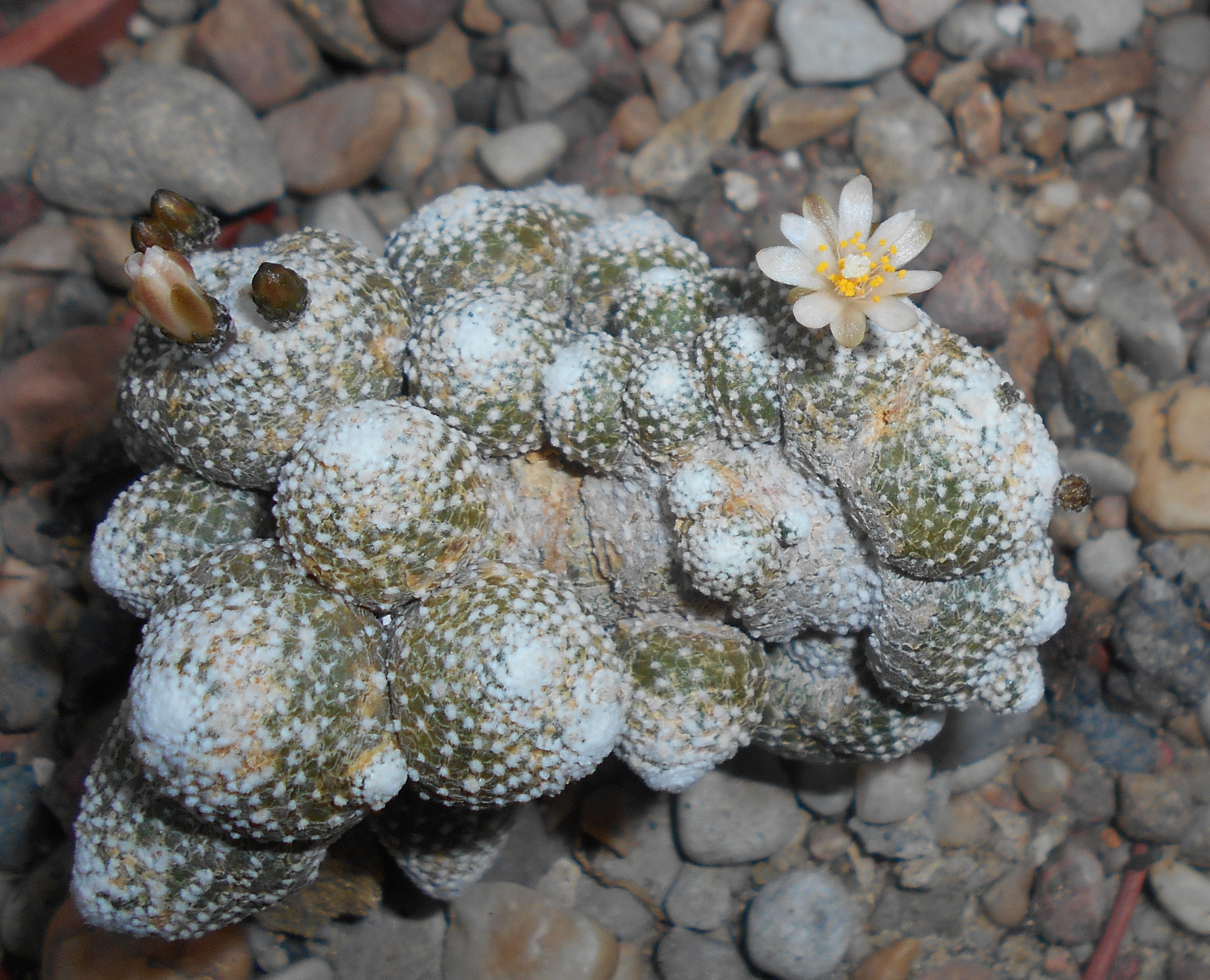

== Taxonomy ==
The genus and species were first described in 1937 by Erich Werdermann after being discovered in northern Argentina by Harry Blossfeld and Oreste Marsoner, while exploring northern Argentina in 1936. The genus name honors Blossfeld. B. liliputiana has several features making it unique among cacti, including a very small number of stomata, the absence of a thickened cuticle, and hairy seeds with an aril. It is placed in the subfamily Cactoideae, and traditionally in the tribe Notocacteae. However, molecular phylogenetic studies have repeatedly shown that it is sister to the remaining members of the subfamily, and well removed from other genera placed in the Notocacteae:

- subfamily Cactoideae
  - Blossfeldia
  - - tribe Cacteae
    - core Cactoideae, including traditional members of tribe Notocacteae

Nyffeler and Eggli, in their 2010 classification of Cactaceae, accepted tribe Blossfeldieae as outlined by Crozier, within Cactoideae. Earlier, Blossfeldia was considered as a distinct genus within the tribe Notocacteae; it had even been placed in an entirely separate subfamily, Blossfeldioideae.

A nomenclature synonym is Parodia liliputana (Werderm.) N.P.Taylor (1987).

== Bibliography ==
- Buxbaum F., "Gattung Blossfeldia", in Krainz H., Die Kakteen, 1.11.1964
- Fechser H., "Blossfeldia liliputana - The Tiniest Cactus", Cact. Succ. J. (US), 32 : 123-125, 1960
- John V., "Strombocactus, Blossfeldia a Aztekium", Kaktusy, 23 : 38-41, 1987
- Kilian G., "Beitrag zur Blossfeldia-Kultur", Kakt. und and. Succ., 13 : 82-83, 1962
- Köhler U., "Beobachtungen an Blossfeldien", Kakt. und and. Succ., 17 : 11-14, 1966;
- "Blossfeldia heute", Kakt. und and. Sukk., 32 : 132133, 1981
- Říha J., "Blossfeldia liliputana Werdermann, Kaktusy, 22 : 105-107, 1986
- E. Werdermann (1937). "Neue und kritische Kakteen aus den Sammelergebnissen der Reisen von Harry Bloßfeld und O. Marsoner durch Südamerika 1936/37, III" (PDF). Kakteenkunde: 161–164.
- "Blossfeldia liliputana". Germplasm Resources Information Network. Agricultural Research Service, United States Department of Agriculture.
- http://llifle.com/Encyclopedia/CACTI/Family/Cactaceae/5701/Blossfeldia_liliputana
