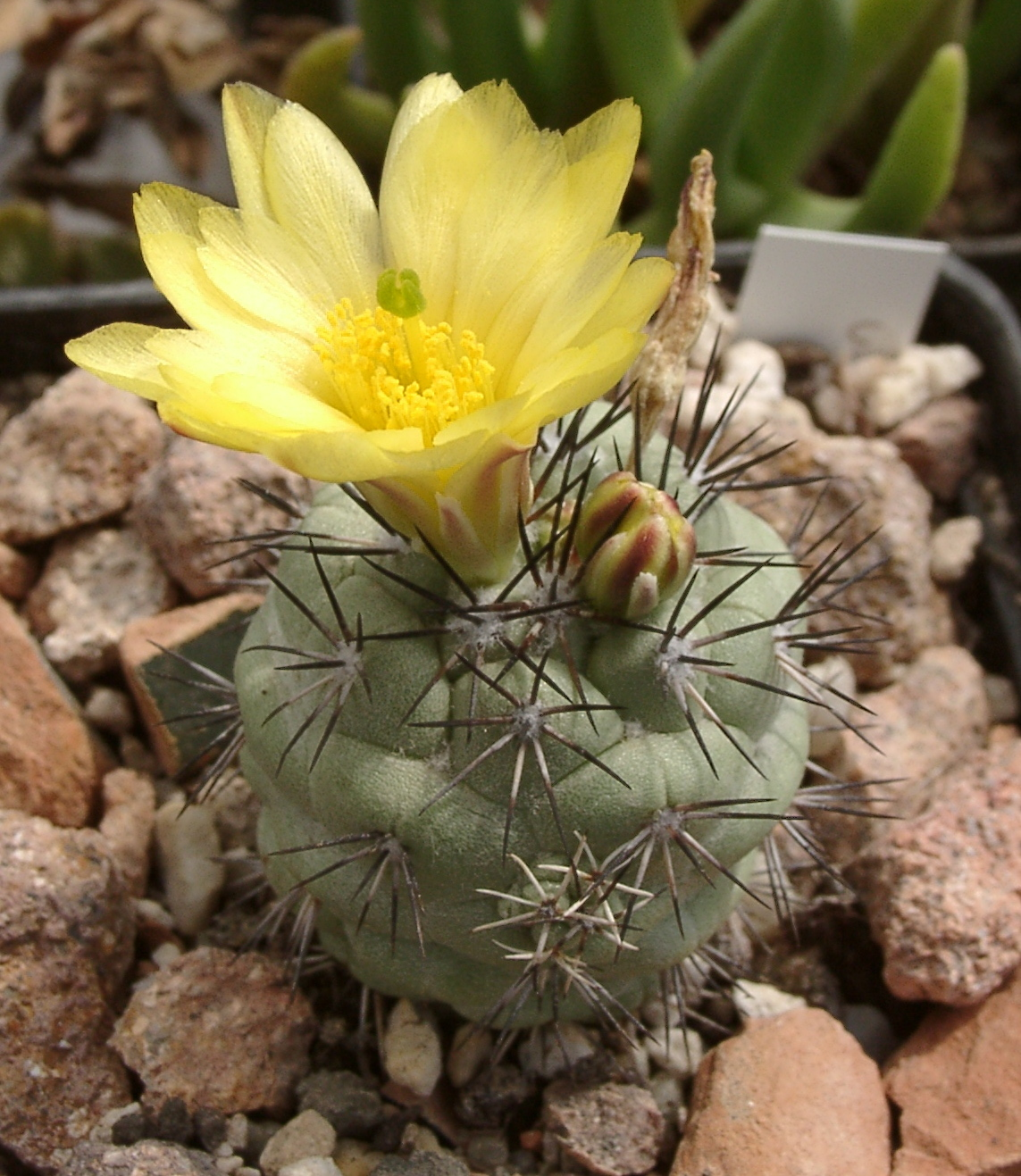

Scientific classification
- Kingdom: Plantae
- Clade: Embryophytes
- Clade: Tracheophytes
- Clade: Spermatophytes
- Clade: Angiosperms
- Clade: Eudicots
- Order: Caryophyllales
- Family: Cactaceae
- Subfamily: Cactoideae
- Tribe: Cacteae
- Genus: Ortegocactus; Alexander
- Species: O. macdougallii

Binomial name
- Ortegocactus macdougallii Alexander 1961

Synonyms
- Escobaria macdougallii (Alexander) V.John & Ríha; Neobesseya macdougallii (Alexander) Kladiwa; Cochemiea macdougallii (Alexander) P.B.Breslin & Majure 2021

= Ortegocactus =

Genus of cacti

Ortegocactus is a monotypic genus of cactus with a single species Ortegocactus macdougallii.

== Description ==
Ortegocactus macdougallii forms loose cushions. The spherical to short cylindrical shoots have a pale gray-green epidermis and a diameter of 3 to 4 centimeters. The spirally arranged tubercles are low, somewhat flattened, rhomboid and tiny dotted. The areoles are woolly in the upper part, have thorns and are sometimes furrowed. The black to whitish, upright central spine has a dark tip and is 4 to 5 millimeters long. The 7 to 8 marginal spines are whitish with dark tips and are 5 to 10 millimeters long.

The yellow, funnel-shaped flowers appear from the axillae. They open during the day, are 2 to 3 centimeters long and 1.8 to 2.5 centimeters in diameter. The flower cup is woolly, but has no scales.

The dull red, dry fruits when ripe are spherical to slightly elongated and have a persistent flower remnant. They contain almost spherical, black to brown, dotted seeds.

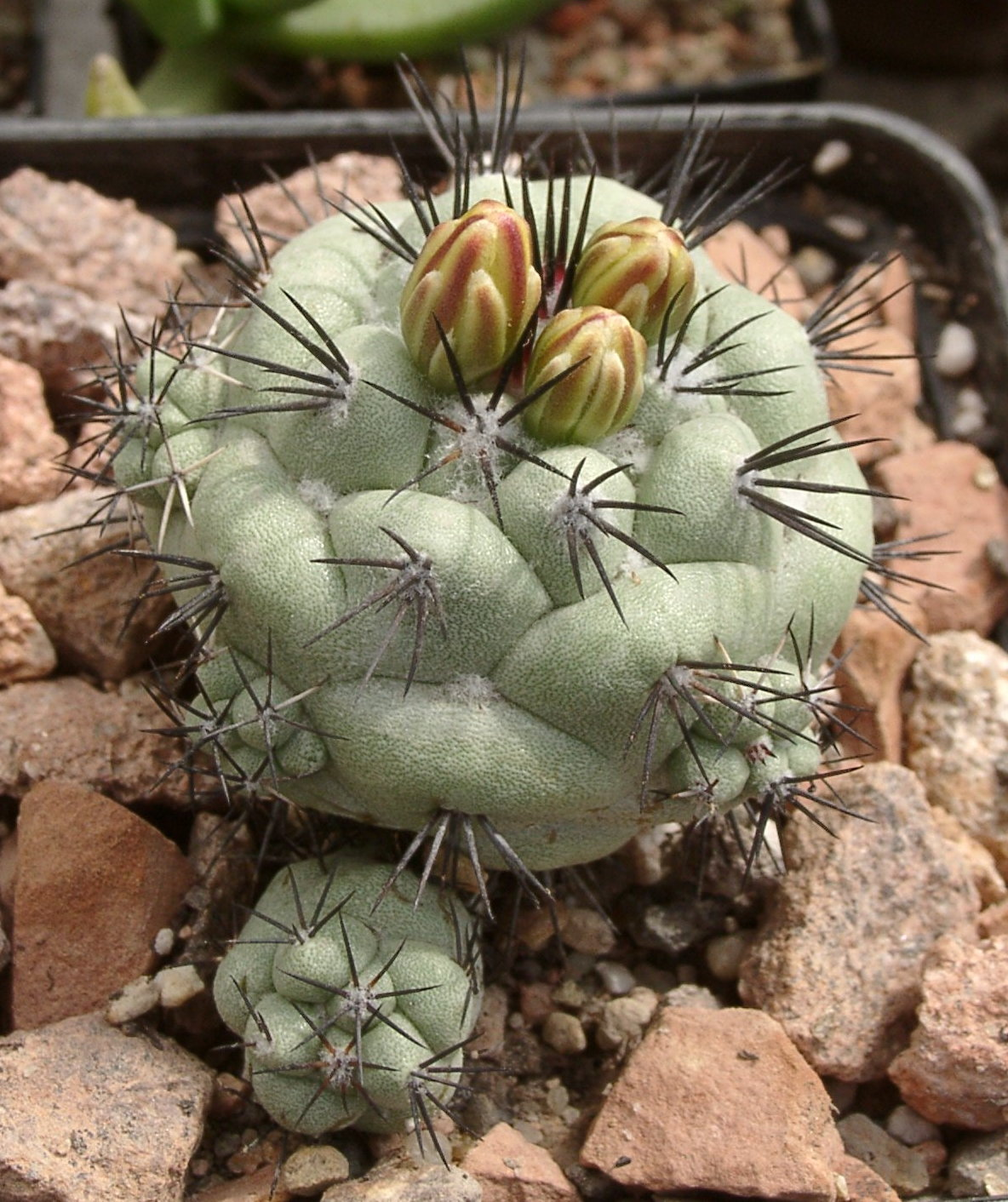
Plant

== Distribution ==
Ortegocactus macdougallii is found in the Mexican state of Oaxaca, where it grows on limestone cliffs.

== Taxonomy ==
The species was found in the winter of 1951/52 by Thomas Baillie MacDougall (1895–1973) near the village of San José Lachiguirí. The specific epithet macdougallii honors Thomas Baillie MacDougall (1895–1973), the discoverer of the species. The first description as Ortegocactus macdougallii in the monotypic genus Ortegocactus was made in 1961 by Edward Johnston Alexander. It was the only species in Alexander's genus Ortegocactus. Peter B. Breslin and Lucas C. Majure placed the species in the genus Cochemiea in 2021.
