= De Haas =

De Haas is a Dutch surname. Meaning "the hare", its origin may be descriptive or the name of an address. It is the equivalent of the Portuguese surname Coelho, of the same meaning. Among variant forms are De Haes, DeHaas, Dehaes, and Den Haas. People with this name include:

De Haas / DeHaas

- Darius de Haas (born 1968), American stage actor and singer
- Deborah DeHaas (born 1959), American businesswoman
- Geertruida de Haas-Lorentz (1885–1973), Dutch physicist, daughter of Hendrik Lorentz, wife of Wander Johannes de Haas
- Irma de Haas (born 1975), Dutch volleyball player
- Jack de Haas (1875–1940), Dutch draughts player
- Jacob de Haas (1872–1937), British Jew and a leader for modern Zionism movement
- Johannes Hubertus Leonardus de Haas (1832–1908), Dutch animal and landscape painter
- John Philip De Haas (c1735-1786), Dutch–born British and American military officer
- Mauritz de Haas (1832–1895), Dutch-born American painter
- Nico de Haas (1907–2000), Dutch graphic-designer
- Saskia de Haas, Dutch cellist
- Troy de Haas (born 1979), Australian athlete
- Walter de Haas (1886–1969), better known under the pseudonym Hanns Günther, German author, translator, and publisher of popular scientific works
- Wander Johannes de Haas (1878–1960), Dutch physicist
- William Frederick de Haas (1830–1880), Dutch-born American painter

De Haes / Dehaes

- Carlos de Haes (1829–1898), Belgian-born Spanish painter
- Frans De Haes (1895–1923), Belgian weightlifter
- Gilles De Haes (1597–1657), Flemish soldier, general of the Army of Tyrol, governor of Dalmatia
- Jos De Haes (1920–1974), Flemish writer and poet
- Kenny Dehaes (born 1984), Belgian racing cyclist

== See also ==
- Haas (surname)
