= Fishbone cactus =

Fishbone cactus or zig-zag cactus is the common name of several cacti:

- Disocactus anguliger
- Selenicereus anthonyanus
- Weberocereus imitans
