= Chupasangre =

Chupasangre or chupa sangre may refer to:

- Common names for the cactus species:
  - Maihuenia patagonica
  - Maihuenia poeppigii
- A term for vampires
