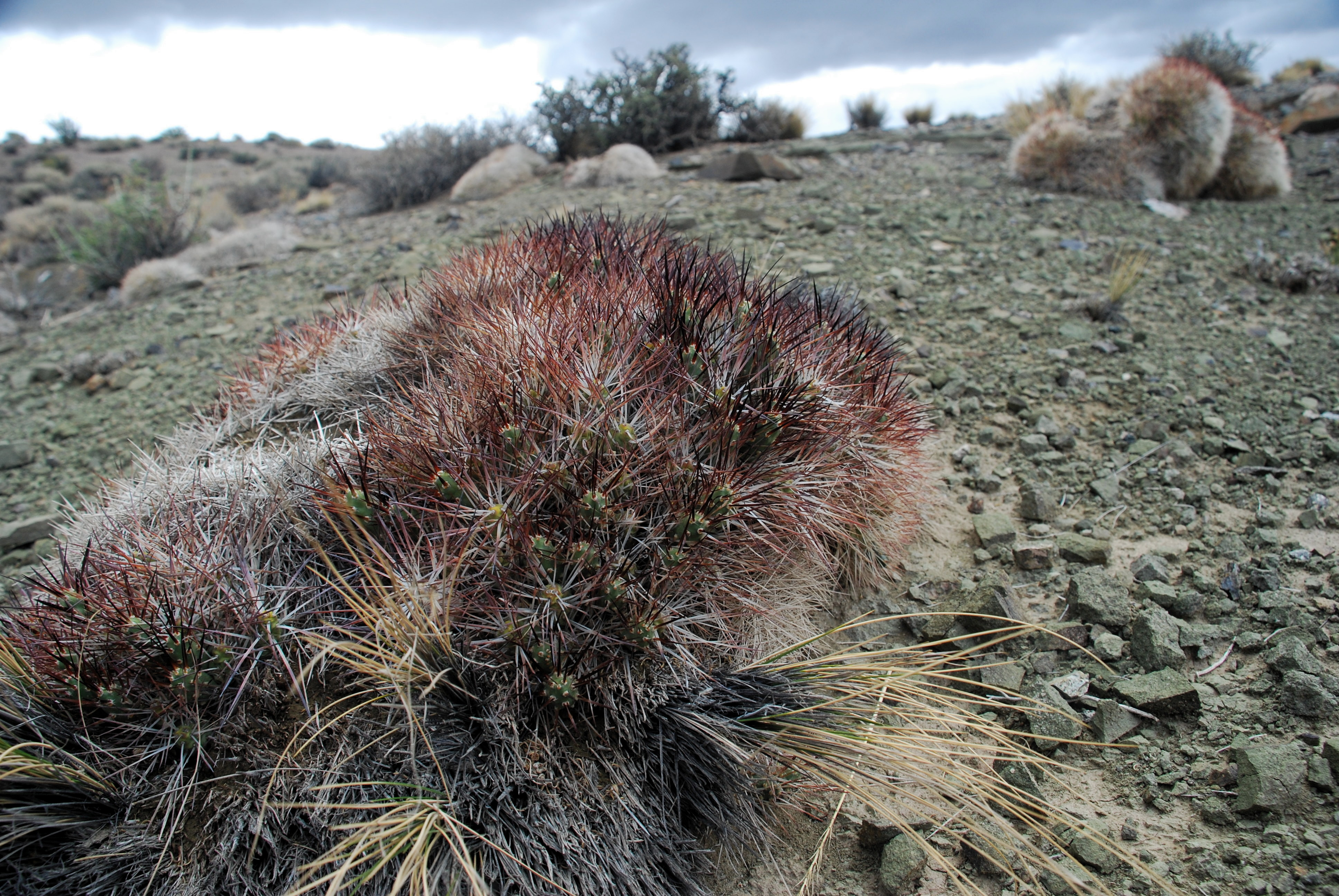
- Maihueniopsis darwinii

Scientific classification
- Kingdom: Plantae
- Clade: Tracheophytes
- Clade: Angiosperms
- Clade: Eudicots
- Order: Caryophyllales
- Family: Cactaceae
- Subfamily: Opuntioideae
- Tribe: Tephrocacteae
- Genus: Maihueniopsis; Speg.

Type species
- Maihueniopsis molfinoi

Species
- See text

= Maihueniopsis =

Genus of cacti

Maihueniopsis (from Greek opsis, "view", referring to its resemblance to the unrelated Maihuenia) is a genus of the cactus family (Cactaceae), containing 18 species.

The former genus Puna R.Kiesling is now synonym to Maihueniopsis.

== Species ==
Species of the genus Maihueniopsis according to Plants of the World Online As of January 2023:

Image	Scientific name	Distribution
	Maihueniopsis archiconoidea F.Ritter	Chile (Atacama)
	Maihueniopsis atacamensis (Phil.) F.Ritter	Chile (Antofagasta)
	Maihueniopsis camachoi (Espinosa) F.Ritter	Chile (Antofagasta)
	Maihueniopsis clavarioides (Otto ex Pfeiff.) E.F.Anderson	Argentina (San Juan, Mendoza)
	Maihueniopsis colorea (F.Ritter) F.Ritter	Chile (Atacama)
	Maihueniopsis conoidea (F.Ritter) F.Ritter	Chile (Antofagasta)
	Maihueniopsis crassispina F.Ritter	Chile (Atacama)
	Maihueniopsis darwinii (Hensl.) F.Ritter	Chile to Argentina
	Maihueniopsis domeykoensis F.Ritter	Chile (Atacama).
	Maihueniopsis glochidiata G.J.Charles	Argentina (La Rioja)
	Maihueniopsis glomerata (Haw.) R.Kiesling	Chile to Argentina
	Maihueniopsis grandiflora F.Ritter	Chile (Coquimbo)
	Maihueniopsis hickenii (Britton & Rose) D.R.Hunt	Argentina
	Maihueniopsis leoncito (Werderm.) F.Ritter ex P.C.Guerrero & Helmut Walter	Chile.
	Maihueniopsis minuta (Backeb.) R.Kiesling	Argentina (Jujuy, Salta)
	Maihueniopsis molfinoi Speg.	Bolivia to Argentina.
	Maihueniopsis ovata (Pfeiff.) F.Ritter	Chile to Argentina (Mendoza, San Juan)
	Maihueniopsis platyacantha (Salm-Dyck ex Pfeiff.) D.R.Hunt	Argentina (Mendoza, Neuquén)
	Maihueniopsis reicheana (Espinosa) Katt. & Lodé	Chile (Coquimbo)
	Maihueniopsis wagenknechtii F.Ritter	Chile (Coquimbo)
