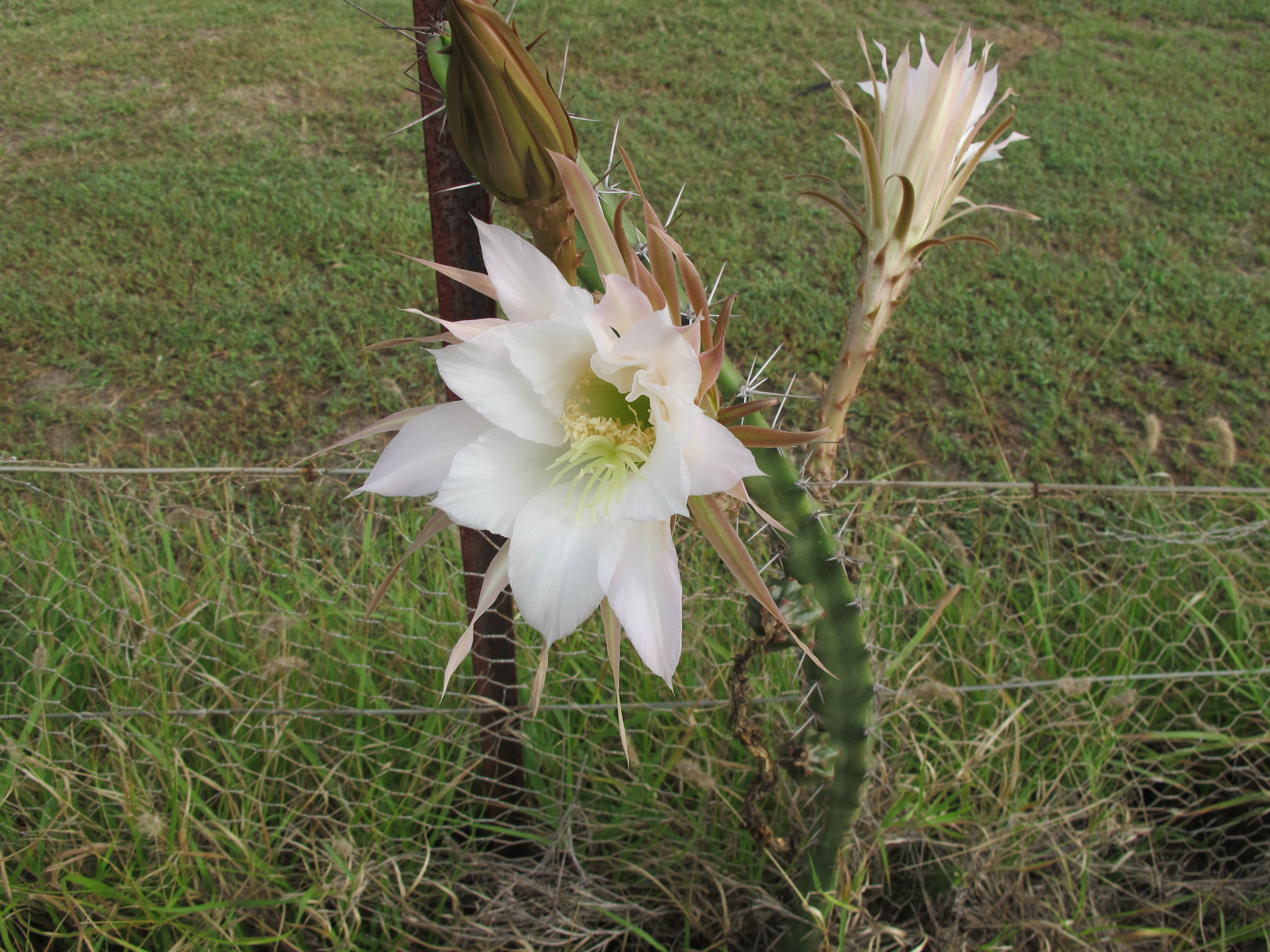

Conservation status
- Least Concern (IUCN 3.1)

Scientific classification
- Kingdom: Plantae
- Clade: Embryophytes
- Clade: Tracheophytes
- Clade: Spermatophytes
- Clade: Angiosperms
- Clade: Eudicots
- Order: Caryophyllales
- Family: Cactaceae
- Subfamily: Cactoideae
- Genus: Harrisia
- Species: H. pomanensis

Binomial name
- Harrisia pomanensis (F.A.C. Weber ex K. Schum.) Britton & Rose

Synonyms
- Cereus pomanensis F.A.C.Weber ex K.Schum. 1897; Echinopsis pomanensis (F.A.C.Weber ex K.Schum.) Anceschi & Magli 2013; Eriocereus pomanensis (F.A.C.Weber ex K.Schum.) A.Berger 1929; Eriocereus polyacanthus F.Ritter 1980; Eriocereus pomanensis var. uruguayensis (Osten) Backeb. 1960; Eriocereus tarijensis F.Ritter 1980; Harrisia pomanensis subsp. tarijensis (F.Ritter) P.J.Braun & Esteves 1995; Harrisia tortuosa var. uruguayensis Osten 1941; Harrisia tortuosa subsp. uruguayensis (Osten) Lodé 2013 publ. 2012

= Harrisia pomanensis =

Species of cactus

Harrisia pomanensis is a species of cactus.

== Description ==
Harrisia pomanensis sometimes grows a bit bushy. The more or less upright, sometimes arched or prostrate, blue-green or gray-green, glaucous shoots are almost round and have a diameter of 2 to 4 centimeters. There are four to seven blunt, rounded, non-humped ribs. The needle-like, initially reddish to almost white thorns later turn gray with a black tip. The individual central spine is 1 to 2 centimeters long. The six to eight marginal spines reach a length of up to 1 centimeter.

The flowers reach a length of up to 15 centimeters. The spherical, slightly bumpy red fruits have a few scales.

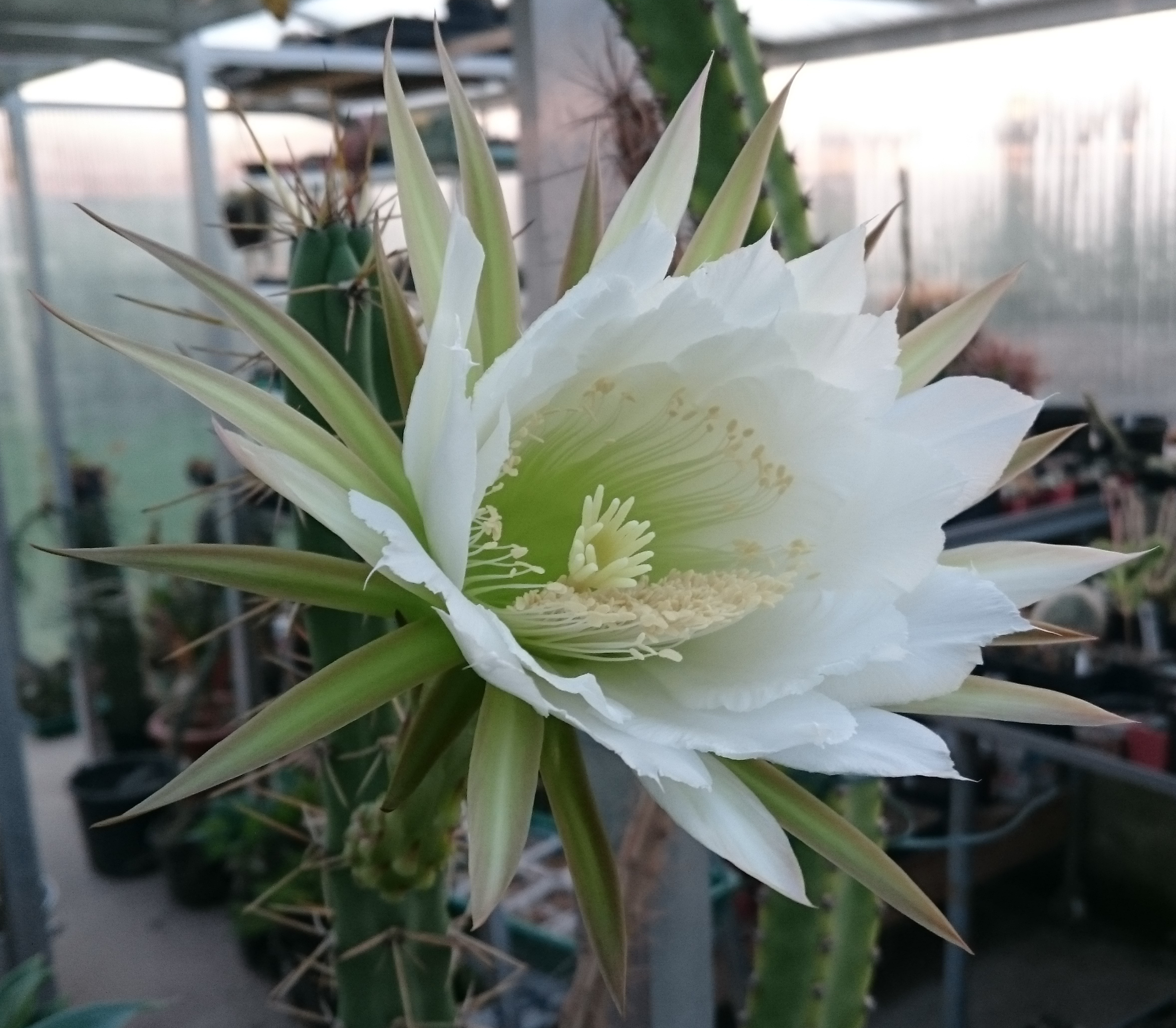
Flower

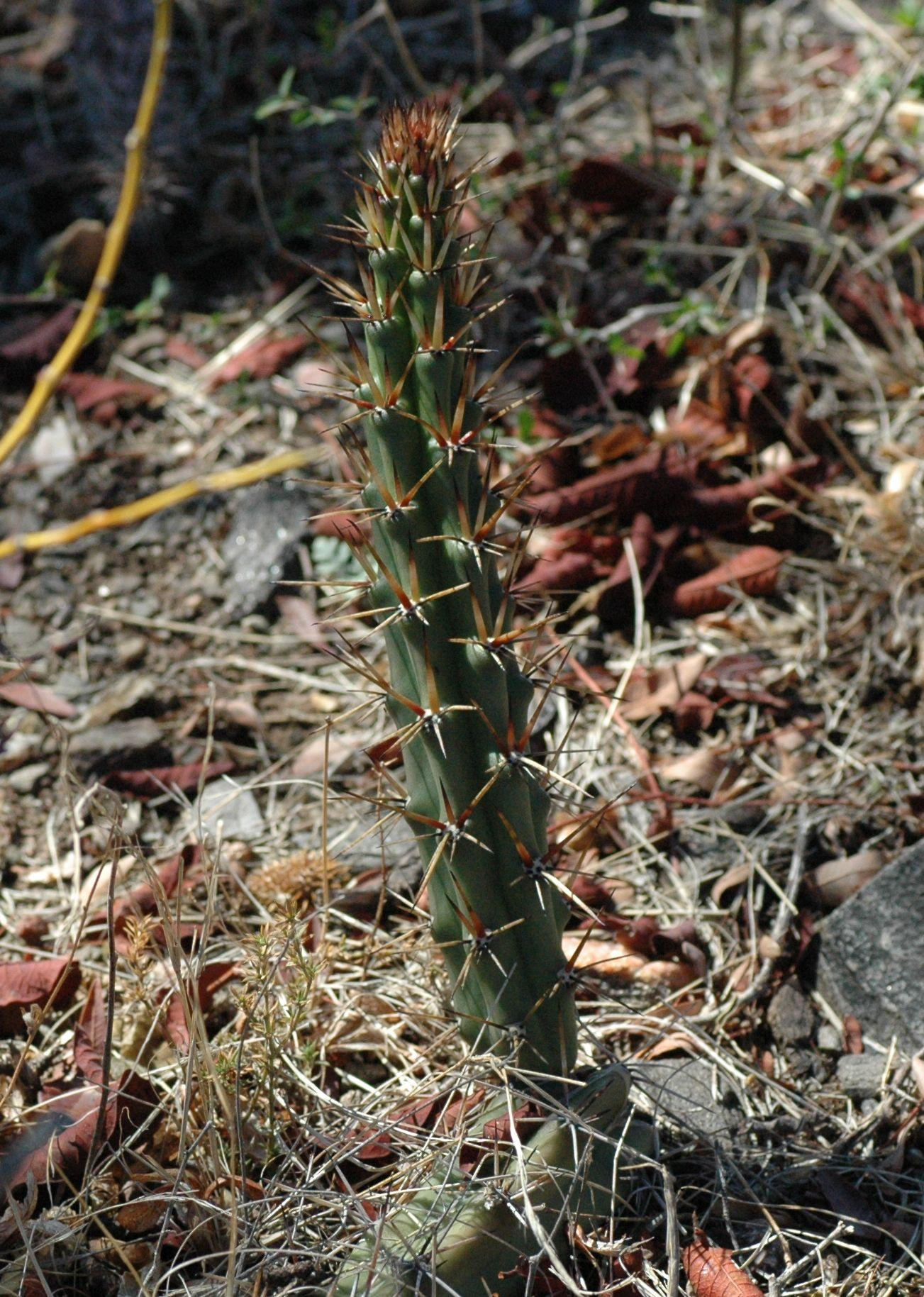
Plants

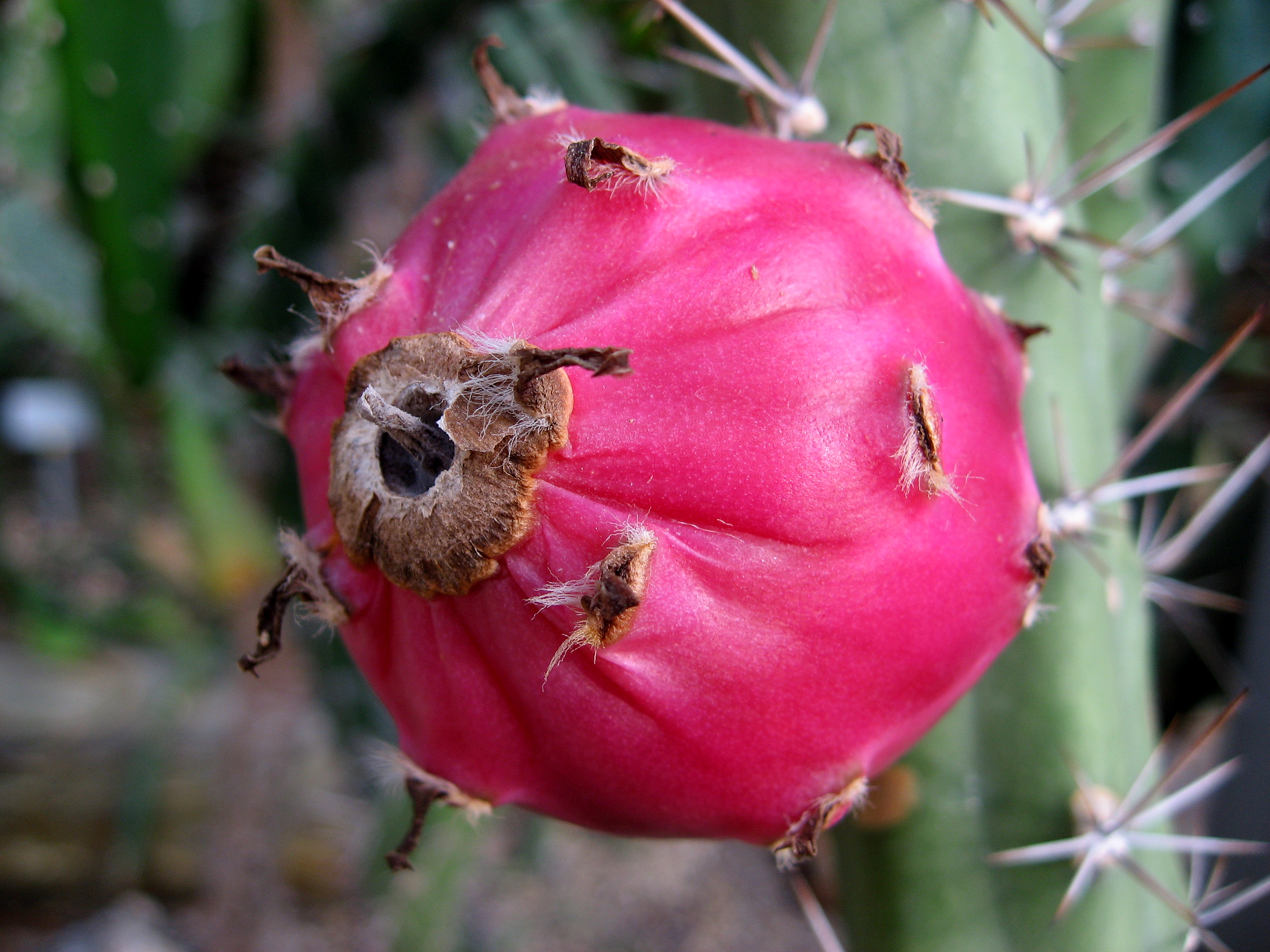
Fruit

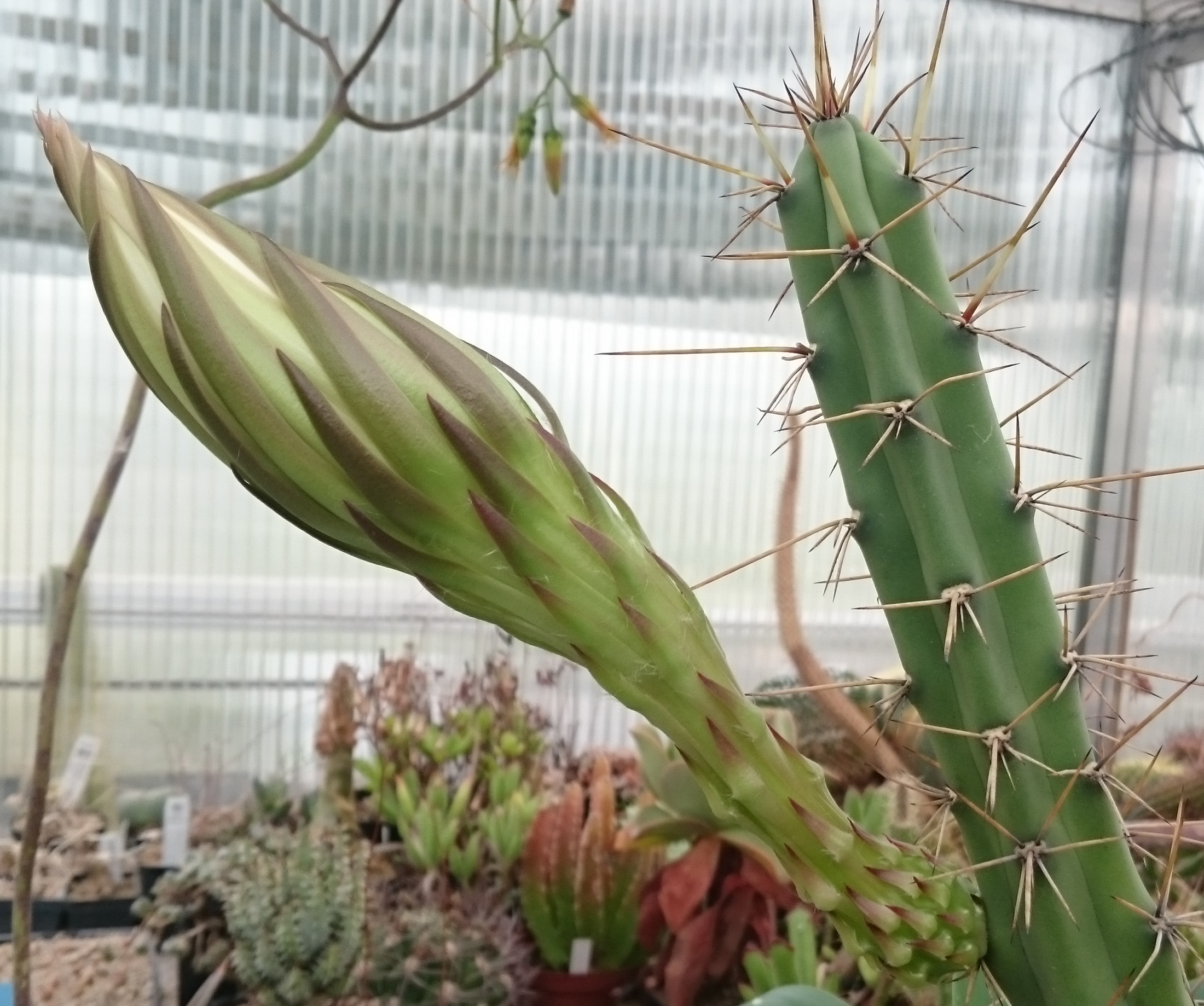
Buds

== Distribution ==
Harrisia pomanensis is widespread in southern Paraguay, Bolivia and northern Argentina at elevations of 200 to 1200 meters.

Harrisia pomanensis is considered an exotic invasive in Australia.

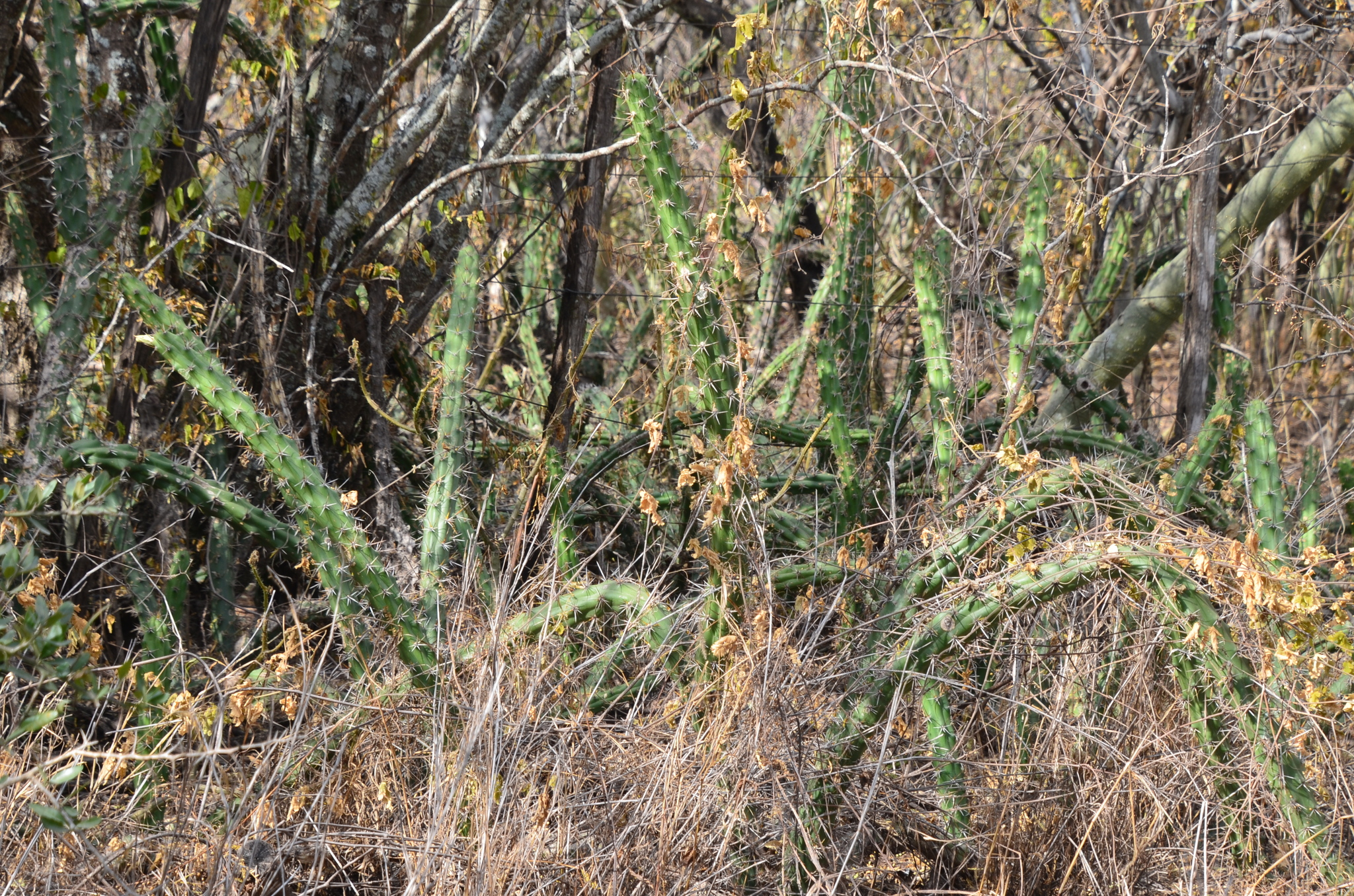
Habitat in Paraná, Santiago del Estero Province, Argentina

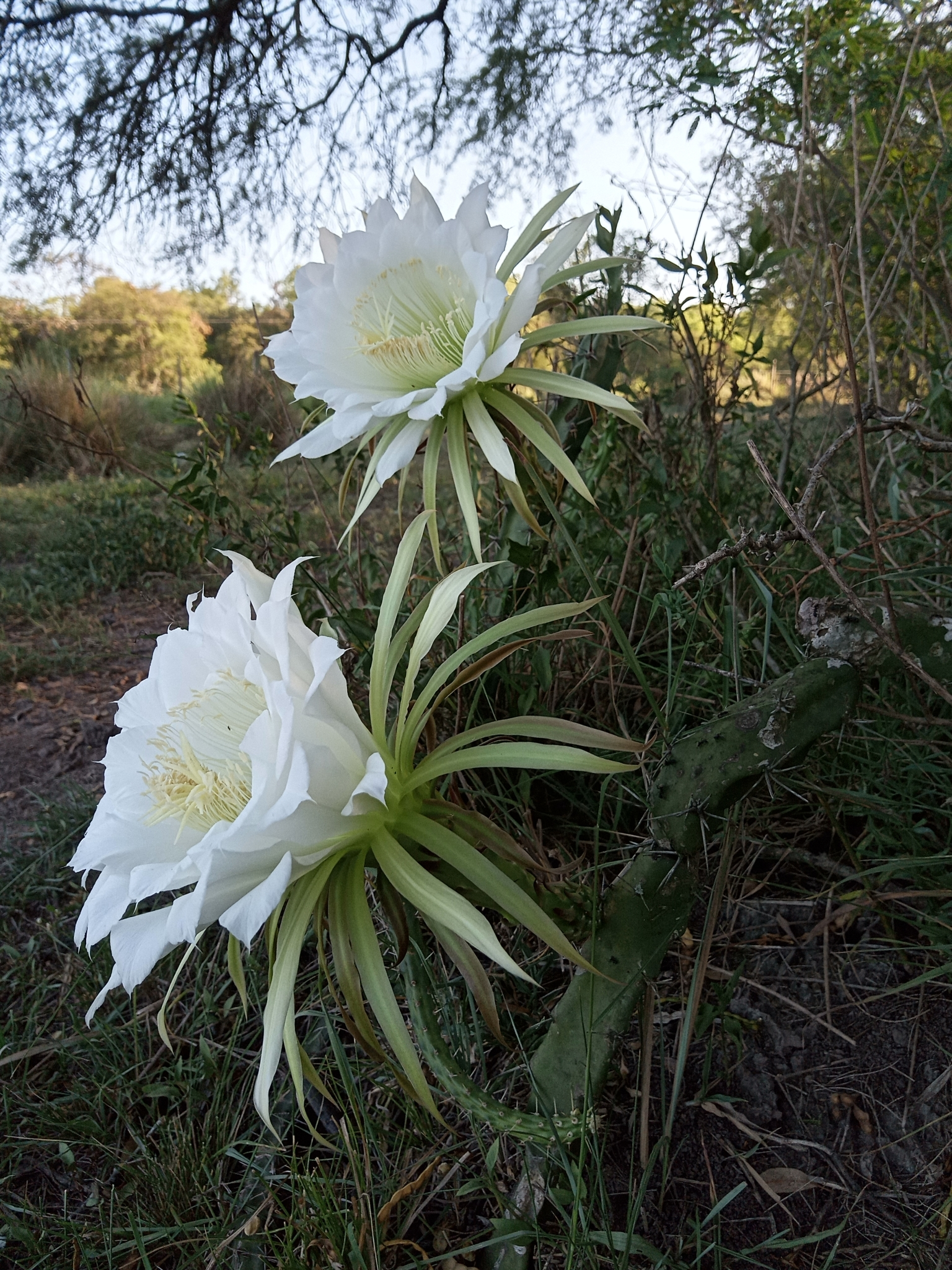
Plant flowering in Cardoso, Chaco Province, Argentina

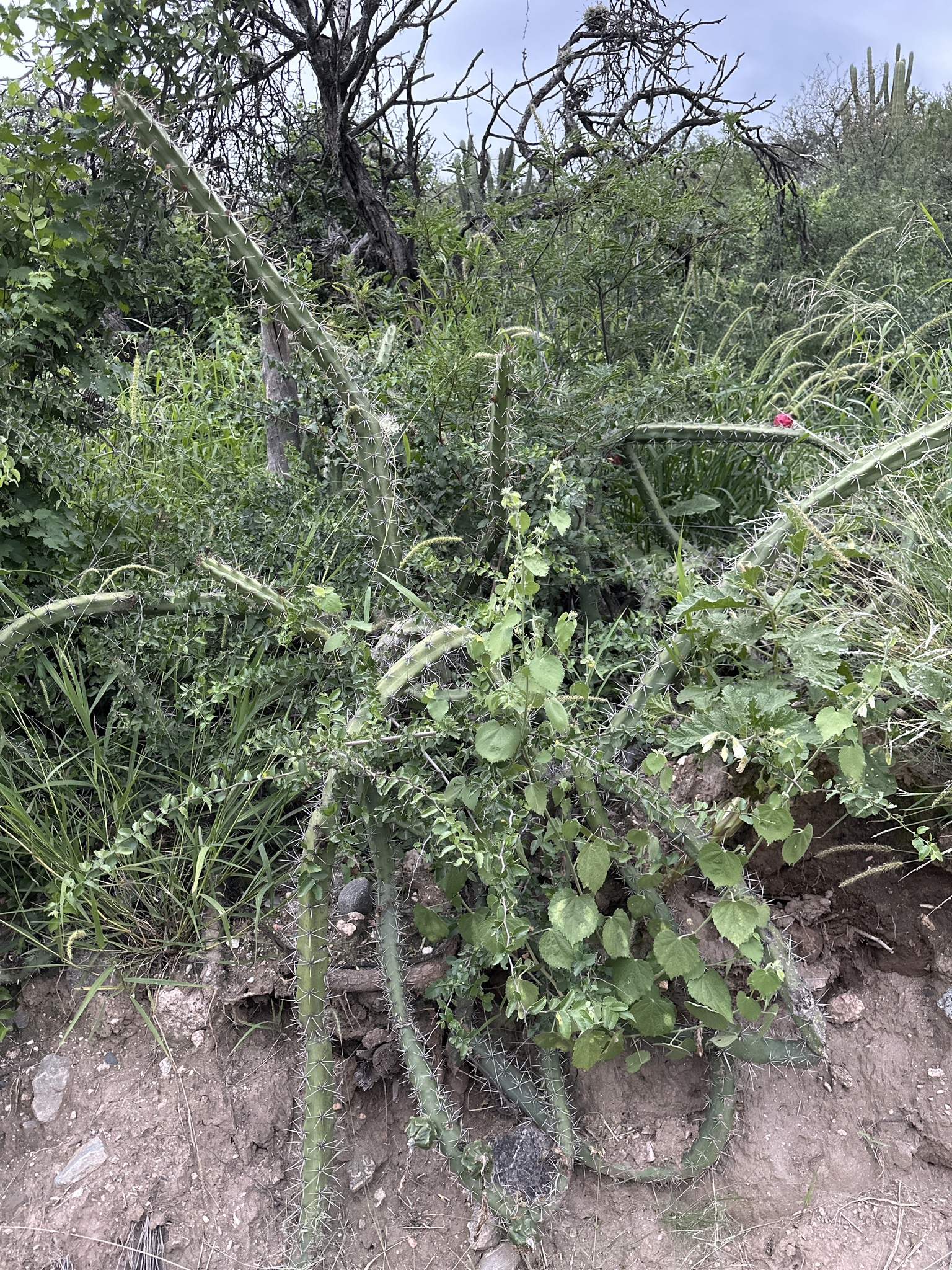
Habitat in Coneta, Catamarca Province, Argentina

== Taxonomy ==
The first description as Cereus pomanensis was made in 1897 by Frédéric Albert Constantin Weber in Karl Moritz Schumann's complete description of cacti. The specific epithet pomanensis refers to the occurrence of the species near Pomán in the Argentine province of Catamarca. Nathaniel Lord Britton and Joseph Nelson Rose placed the species in the genus Harrisia in 1920. Further nomenclature synonyms are Eriocereus pomanensis (F.A.C.Weber) A.Berger (1929) and Echinopsis pomanensis (F.A.C.Weber) Anceschi & Magli (2013).
