= Maihueniopsis ovata =

Scientific classification
- Kingdom: Plantae
- Clade: Tracheophytes
- Clade: Angiosperms
- Clade: Eudicots
- Order: Caryophyllales
- Family: Cactaceae
- Genus: Maihueniopsis
- Species: M. ovata

Binomial name
- Maihueniopsis ovata (Pfeiff.) F.Ritter

Synonyms
- This species has 10 synonyms: (see text)

Species of plant

Maihueniopsis ovata, commonly known in Spanish as gatito or perrito, is a species of succulent flowering plant in the genus Maihueniopsis, within the family Cactaceae. It is distributed from central Chile to western Argentina.

== Description ==
Maihueniopsis ovata is a species of cactus which forms small, dense cushions measuring up to 10 cm in height and 50 cm in diameter. The stems are divided into ovoid segments, which are sometimes attenuate towards the apices; the segments do not have tubercles, and measure 3 to 5 cm in length and 1.5 to 2 cm in diameter. The epidermis varies in color from green to grayish-blue-green; occasionally, it may become brownish if exposed to the sun. The stems branch from the ends of their segments.

Stems

On each segment, there are approximately 20 areoles, which are distributed until a point just above the base; the areoles only develop spines on the upper third of the segment. The areoles measure 1 to 2 mm in diameter, are off-white in color, and are soft in appearance. The glochids are conspicuous; they are straw-colored and measure up to 1 cm in length. Each areole has 3 to 8 spreading spines, which are rigid and of unequal length. The larger spines are subulate or slightly flattened, and vary in color from reddish to yellow; they measure 0.5 to 2 cm in length.

The flowers are bright yellow in color, although they may acquire orange tones. They reach 4.5 cm in length and 5.5 cm in diameter during anthesis. They have no scent. The pericarpel is conical, measuring 1.5 to 2 cm in both length and diameter, and has approximately 16 areoles, of which 4 to 6 are situated on the margin of the perianth. These areoles measure approximately 2 mm in diameter, and are each protected by a fleshy, triangular leaf measuring 2 to 3 mm in length. There is a high amount of wool and many glochids on the areoles; the glochids are yellow-brown in color and measure approximately 4 mm in length. The areoles higher up on the pericarpel also exhibit bristles measuring approximately 1.3 cm in length.

Flower

The perianth exhibits a few fleshy outer tepals; these are spatulate-lanceolate in shape with mucronate apices. They are green in color, and measure 0.5 to 2 cm in length and approximately 0.5 cm in width. The inner tepals are numerous, and are spatulate in shape, measuring approximately 3 cm in length and 1.3 cm in width, with slightly mucronate apices. The gynoecium has a globose ovary cavity measuring approximately 0.8 cm in diameter. The style is fusiform, measuring 2 to 2.5 cm in length and 3 to 5 mm in maximum width. The stigma is short and wide, measuring 3 to 4 mm in length and 6 to 7 mm in diameter; it is made up of approximately 8 obtuse and highly papillose lobes, which are yellow or purple in color. The stamens measure 1 to 1.5 cm in length and have yellow anthers measuring approximately 1.5 mm in diameter.

The fruits are subcylindrical and truncate, measuring approximately 3 cm in length and 2 cm in diameter. They have small, widely-spaced areoles with short white wool; bristles may or may not also be present. The point of attachment to the flower is wide, measuring approximately 2 cm in diameter and 1 cm in depth.

The seeds are lentil-shaped, measuring 1 to 3 mm in diameter and approximately 2 mm thick. They are covered in a relatively thin and soft (but compact) aril, which is thicker at the margins; it is light yellow in color.

== Distribution and habitat ==
Maihueniopsis ovata is native from the Aconcagua River valley in central Chile to the provinces of Mendoza and San Juan in western Argentina. It primarily inhabits the subalpine biome at altitudes from 1000 to 2600 meters above sea level.

== Taxonomy ==
This species was first described as Opuntia ovata, a name published in 1837 by the German botanist Ludwig Karl Georg Pfeiffer in Enumeratio Diagnostica Cactearum hucusque Cognitarum: 144.

Later, the German botanist Friedrich Ritter transferred the species to the genus Maihueniopsis, renaming it Maihueniopsis ovata. He registered these changes in the scientific journal Kakteen in Südamerika 2: 389, published in 1980.

Etymology

- Maihueniopsis: the genus name is derived from the unrelated but visually-similar genus Maihuenia and the Greek suffix -opsis (meaning "appearing like"), alluding to the aforementioned visual similarity.
- ovata: the specific epithet is derived from the Latin word ōvātus (meaning "egg-shaped"), in reference to the egg-shaped segments of this species' stems.

Synonyms

- Cactus ovoides (Lem.) Lem., 1868
- Maihueniopsis ovata f. calva F.Ritter, 1980
- Maihueniopsis ovata f. sterilis F.Ritter, 1980
- Opuntia grata Phil., 1859
- Opuntia grata var. leonina Schelle, 1907
- Opuntia monticola Phil., 1864
- Opuntia ovata Pfeiff., 1837 (basionym)
- Opuntia ovoides Lem., 1839
- Opuntia purpurea R.E.Fr., 1905
- Tephrocactus ovatus (Pfeiff.) Backeb., 1936

== Cultivation ==
This species is primarily cultivated as an ornamental. It may be propagated via cuttings or seed.

== Gallery ==
Mound-shaped plant

In habitat in Luján de Cuyo, Mendoza, Argentina

Spines

Plant in flower

Plant with fruits
