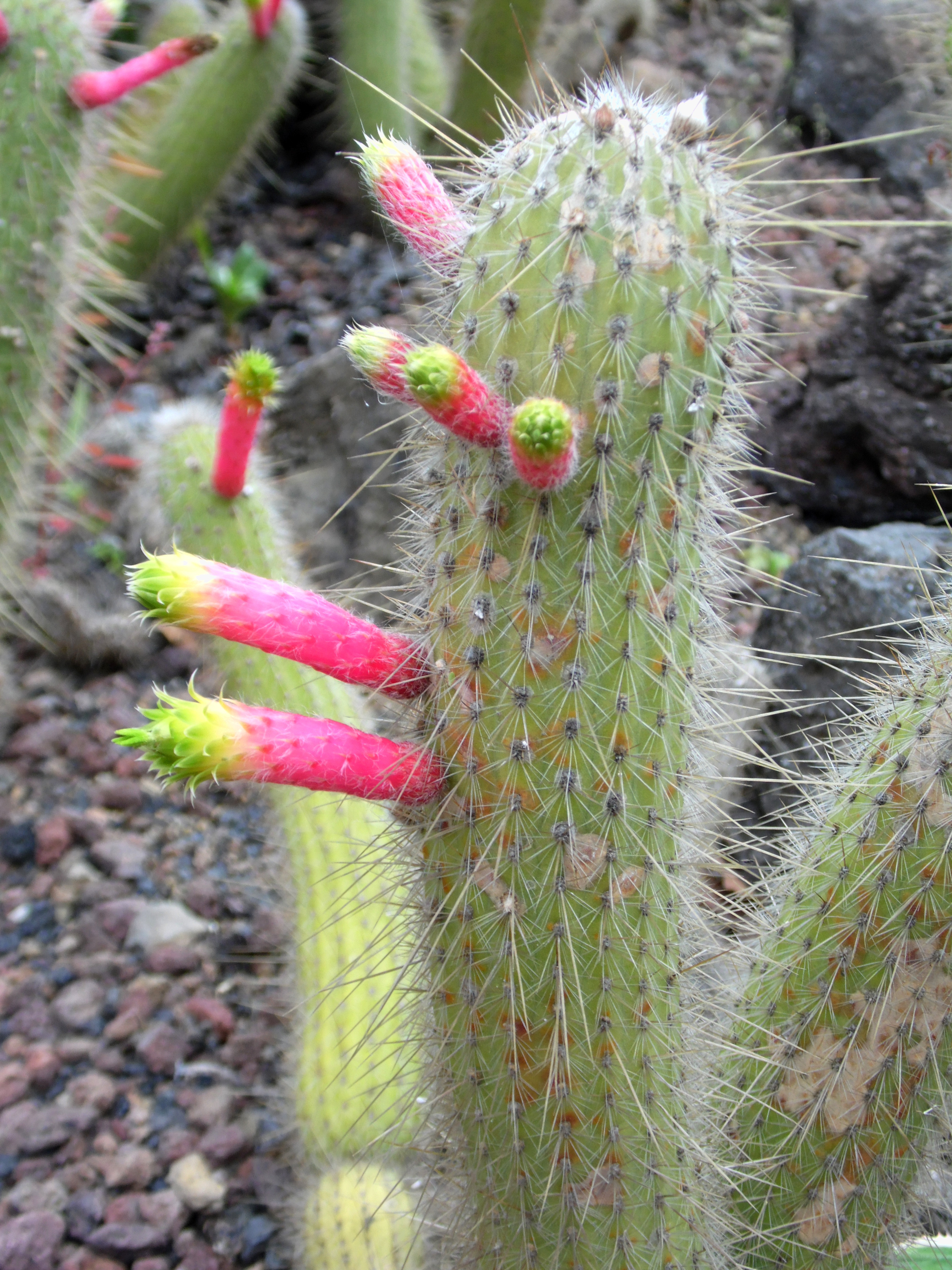

Conservation status
- Least Concern (IUCN 3.1)

Scientific classification
- Kingdom: Plantae
- Clade: Embryophytes
- Clade: Tracheophytes
- Clade: Spermatophytes
- Clade: Angiosperms
- Clade: Eudicots
- Order: Caryophyllales
- Family: Cactaceae
- Subfamily: Cactoideae
- Genus: Cleistocactus
- Species: C. smaragdiflorus

Binomial name
- Cleistocactus smaragdiflorus (F.A.C.Weber) Britton & Rose 1920

Synonyms
- Cereus baumannii var. smaragdiflorus (F.A.C.Weber) K.Schum. 1897; Cereus colubrinus var. smaragdiflorus F.A.C.Weber 1894; Cereus smaragdiflorus (F.A.C.Weber) Speg. 1905; Echinopsis smaragdiflora (F.A.C.Weber) Anceschi & Magli 2021; Cleistocactus azerensis Cárdenas 1961; Cleistocactus ferrarii R.Kiesling i1984; Cleistocactus parapetiensis Cárdenas 1952; Cleistocactus rojoi Cárdenas 1956; Cleistocactus smaragdiflorus var. flavispinus Borg 1937; Cleistocactus smaragdiflorus var. gracilior Backeb. 1966); Cleistocactus smaragdiflorus f. rojoi (Cárdenas) F.Ritter 1980; Cleistocactus villamontesii Cárdenas 1961; Cleistocactus villamontesii var. longiflorior Backeb. 1966

= Cleistocactus smaragdiflorus =

Species of cactus

Cleistocactus smaragdiflorus is a species of Cleistocactus found in Bolivia and Argentina.

== Description ==
Cleistocactus smaragdiflorus grows as a shrub with branched, arched to creeping shoots at the base and reaches heights of growth of up to 1 meter with a diameter of 2 to 3 cm (0.79 to 1.18 in). There are 12 to 14 low ribs present. The 4 to 6 yellowish or brown central spines are 1.5 to 3.5 inches long. The 10 to 34 radial spines that are up to 10 mm (0.39 in) long.

The tubular, straight flowers are erect and 4 to 5 cm (1.6 to 2.0 in) long. The flower tube is red to pink. The bracts are little spread. The stylus protrudes slightly from the flower. The spherical fruits reach a diameter of up to 1.5 cm (0.59 in).

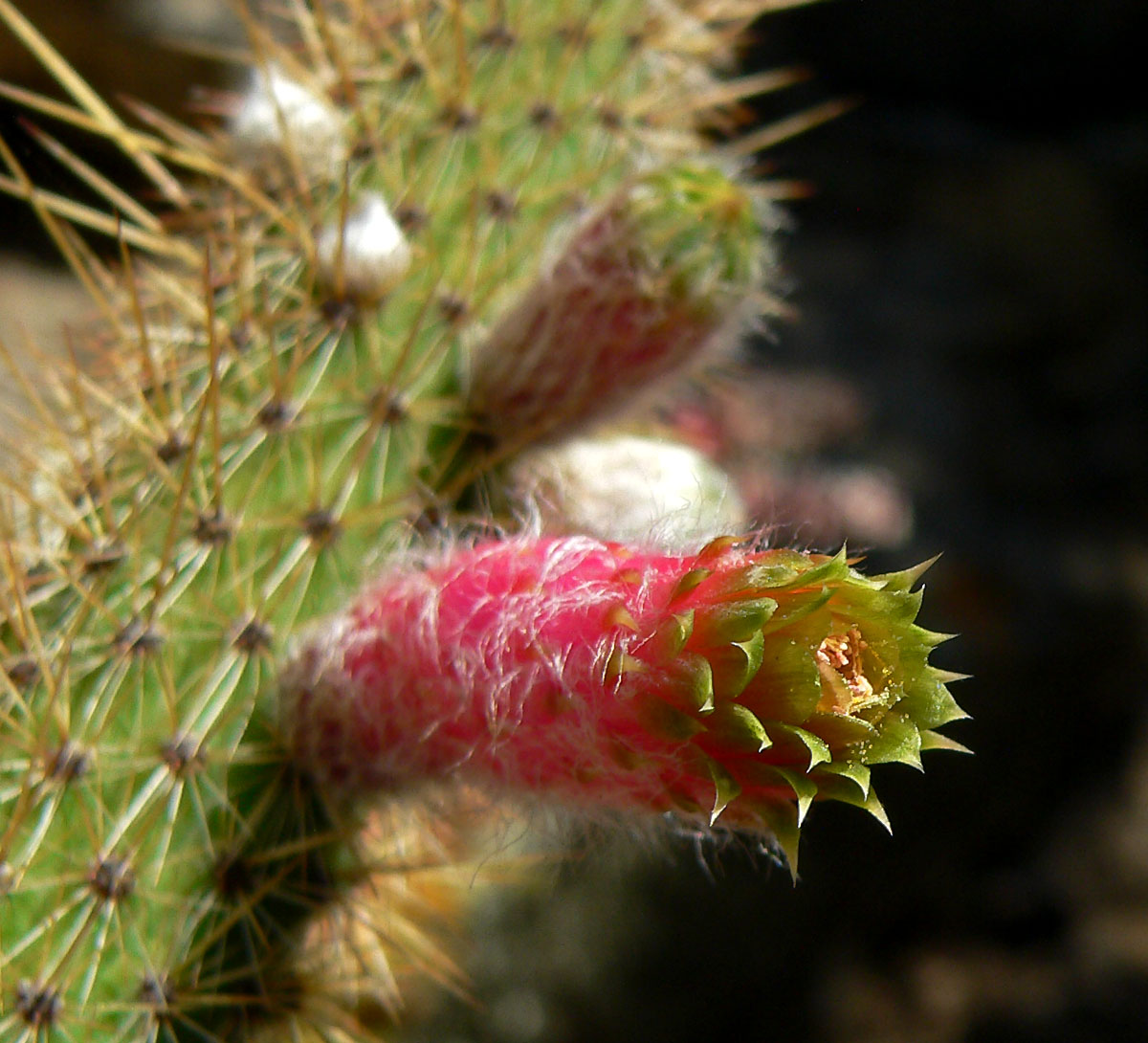
Flower

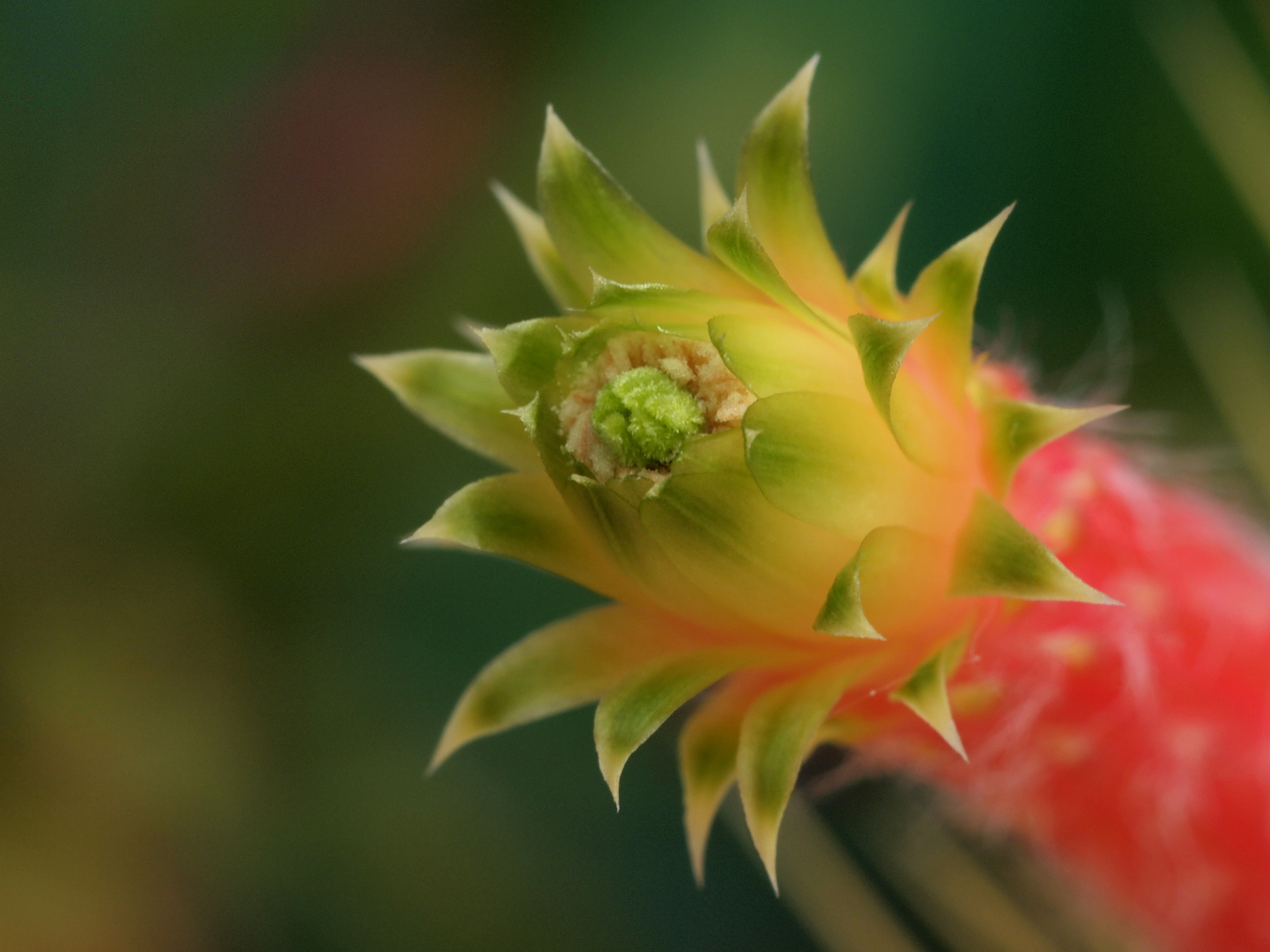
Flower closeup

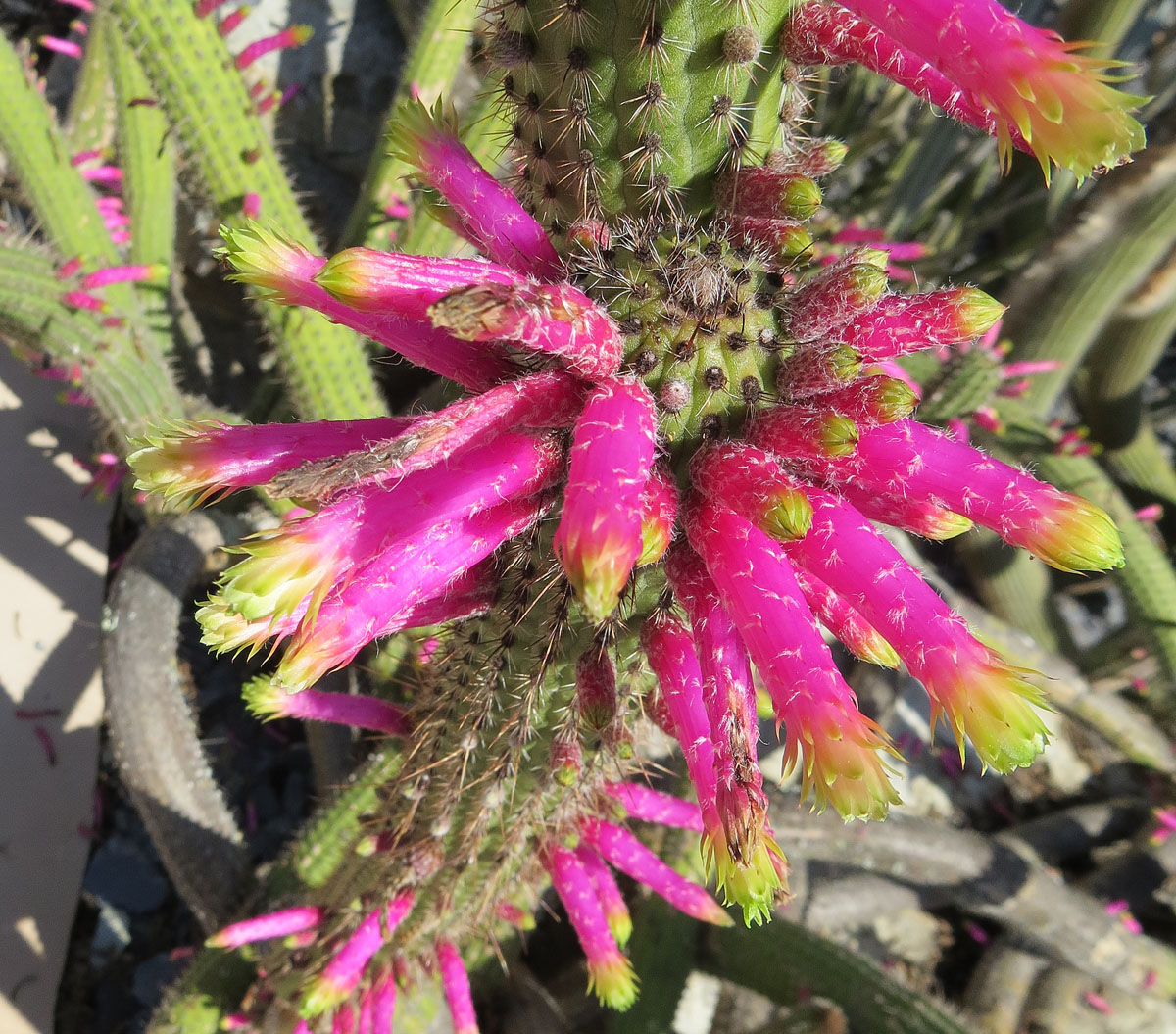
Plant in bloom

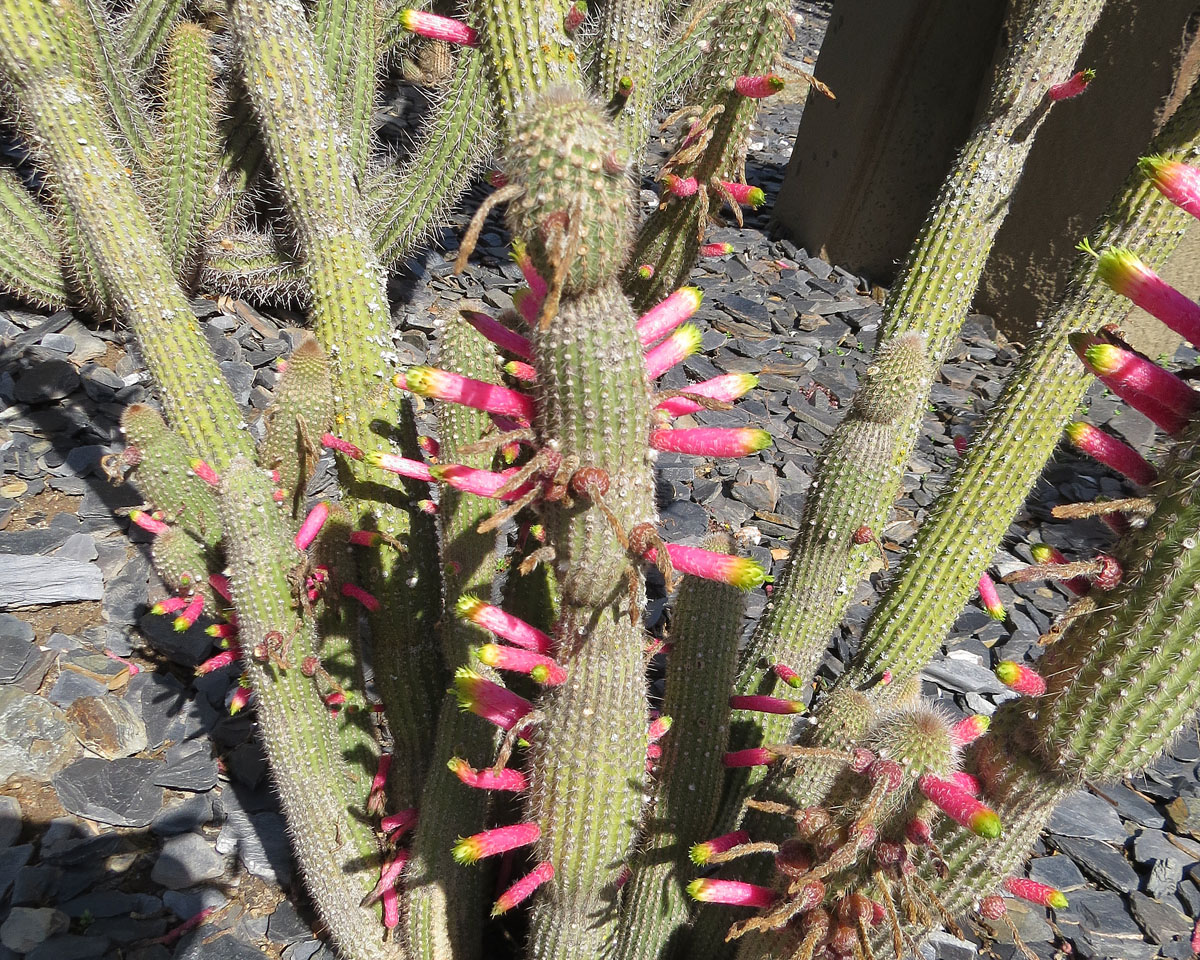
Plant in bloom

== Distribution ==
Cleistocactus smaragdiflorus is found among trees and bushes in the dry hills of the Bolivian department of Tarija and the Argentine provinces of Jujuy, Salta, Tucumán and Catamarca at altitudes of 300 to 1,500 meters.

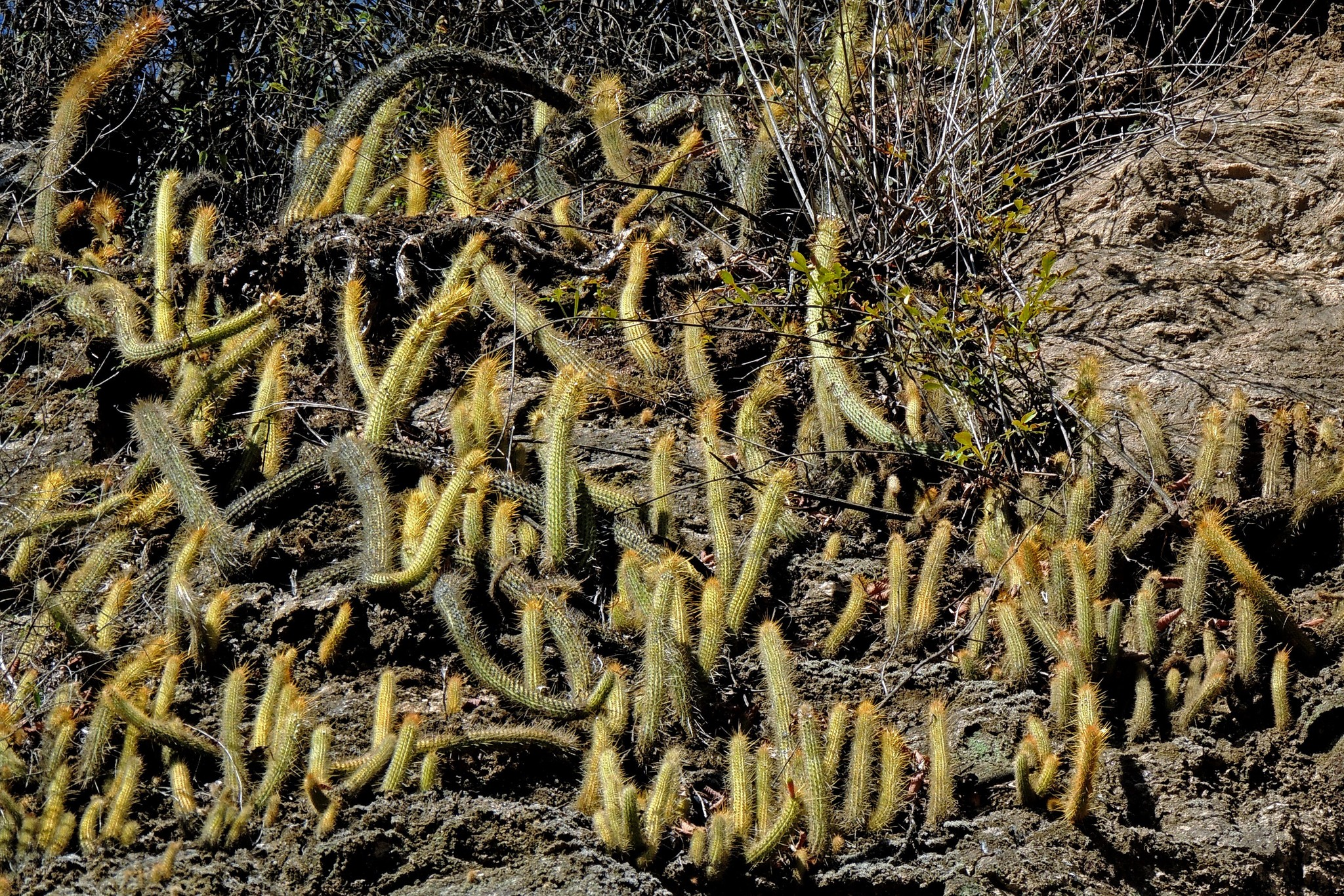
Habitat in La Merced, Catamarca, Argentina

== Taxonomy ==
The first description as Cereus smaragdiflorus was in 1894 by Frédéric Albert Constantin Weber. The plant is name after its emerald green tepals. Nathaniel Lord Britton and Joseph Nelson Rose placed them in the genus Cleistocactus in 1920. Other nomenclature synonyms are Cereus colubrinus var. smaragdiflorus F.A.C. Weber (1894), Cereus baumannii var. smaragdiflorus (F.A.C. Weber) K. Schum. (1897) and Cereus colubrinus var. smaragdiflorus (F.A.C. Weber) Rol.-Goss. (1904).

In the IUCN Red List of Threatened Species, the species is listed as "Least Concern (LC)".
