= Maihueniopsis camachoi =

Scientific classification
- Kingdom: Plantae
- Clade: Tracheophytes
- Clade: Angiosperms
- Clade: Eudicots
- Order: Caryophyllales
- Family: Cactaceae
- Genus: Maihueniopsis
- Species: M. camachoi

Binomial name
- Maihueniopsis camachoi (Espinosa) F.Ritter, 1980

Synonyms
- Opuntia camachoi Espinosa, 1933 (basionym); Tephrocactus camachoi (Espinosa) Backeb., 1958

Species of plant

Maihueniopsis camachoi, commonly known in Spanish as cojín, kume, or puscayo, is a species of succulent flowering plant in the genus Maihueniopsis, within the family Cactaceae. It is endemic to the Antofagasta region of northern Chile.

== Description ==
Maihueniopsis camachoi is a species of cactus with a caespitose habit that forms large, somewhat dome-like cushions that can reach 50-60 cm tall and 1-1.5 m in diameter. The stems are divided into ovoid segments with sharp apices. The segments are 3-4 cm long and 2-2.5 cm in diameter. Their surfaces are covered in fine, conical papillae and inconspicuous tubercles. The epidermis is yellow-green in color, but the segments become more glaucous towards their bases.

Flower of Maihueniopsis camachoi

Small areoles, orbicular or oval in shape, are situated very closely together on the segments, and cover almost their entire length. The areoles are sunken into small depressions and have a white, felt-like covering, which is sometimes tinged with a cream color. Each areole has 1-3 straight, thin central spines, up to 6.5 cm long, which point slightly upwards. At the base, these spines are white, lustrous, and weakly compressed and twisted. Towards their apices, they become more cylindrical-conical in shape and can have white and rust-colored spots. Furthermore, each areole has 1-2 short, rigid, bristle-like radial spines. These are generally curved outwards and are slightly flattened. The leaves are scale-like, coriaceous, and small, measuring 1-2 mm long. They are ovate-acuminate or linear-acuminate in shape. The glochids are numerous and honey-colored.

The flowers grow to 6 cm long. The pericarpel possesses many tightly-spaced areoles, and is sparsely covered in bristles on the upper margin. The ovary is obovate-cylindrical in shape, measuring approximately 4 cm long and 2.5 cm in diameter; around the perianth, there are 4-8 unequal, erect spines per areole, but lower down on the ovary, the areoles are spineless. The perianth measures approximately 2 cm long. The sepals are yellow-green in color; the basal outer sepals are ovate-lanceolate, acuminate, and fleshy with scarious margins, while the inner sepals are oval. The petals are oblong-spatulate with mucronulate apices and grow to 1.8 cm long. The anthers are oblong and yellowish, and the pollen grains are globose, measuring 80-88 µm in diameter.

The fruit is spineless, but is densely covered in glochids. The seeds are somewhat lentil-shaped and yellowish in color. They are 2.5-3 mm long and wide, and 1-1.5 mm thick. The margin of the aril is broad, prominent, and without wool.

== Distribution and habitat ==
Maihueniopsis camachoi is native to the region of Antofagasta in northern Chile. It is mainly found in the tropical montane biome, at altitudes between 2000 and 3000 meters above sea level. It grows at medium altitudes in the Andes, on plains and dry, gravelly slopes.

== Taxonomy ==
This species was first described as Opuntia camachoi, a name published in 1933 by German botanist Marcial Ramón Espinosa Bustos in the scientific journal Revista Chilena de Historia Natural: 37: 126.

Later, German botanist Friedrich Ritter moved the species to the genus Maihueniopsis and renamed it Maihueniopsis camachoi, a name published in Kakteen in Südamerika 3: 873 in 1980.

Etymology

- Maihueniopsis: The genus name is derived from the unrelated but visually-similar genus Maihuenia and the Greek suffix -opsis (meaning "appearing like"), alluding to the aforementioned visual similarity.
- camachoi: The specific epithet honors Carlos Camacho, who discovered this species on the roads between Calama and San Pedro de Atacama, in Chile.

== Cultivation ==
Maihueniopsis camachoi is cultivated mainly as an ornamental. It can be propagated vegetatively via cuttings, or by seed.

== Gallery ==
In habitat in El Loa, Antofagasta, Chile

Stems

Spines

Plant in flower

Plant with fruits
