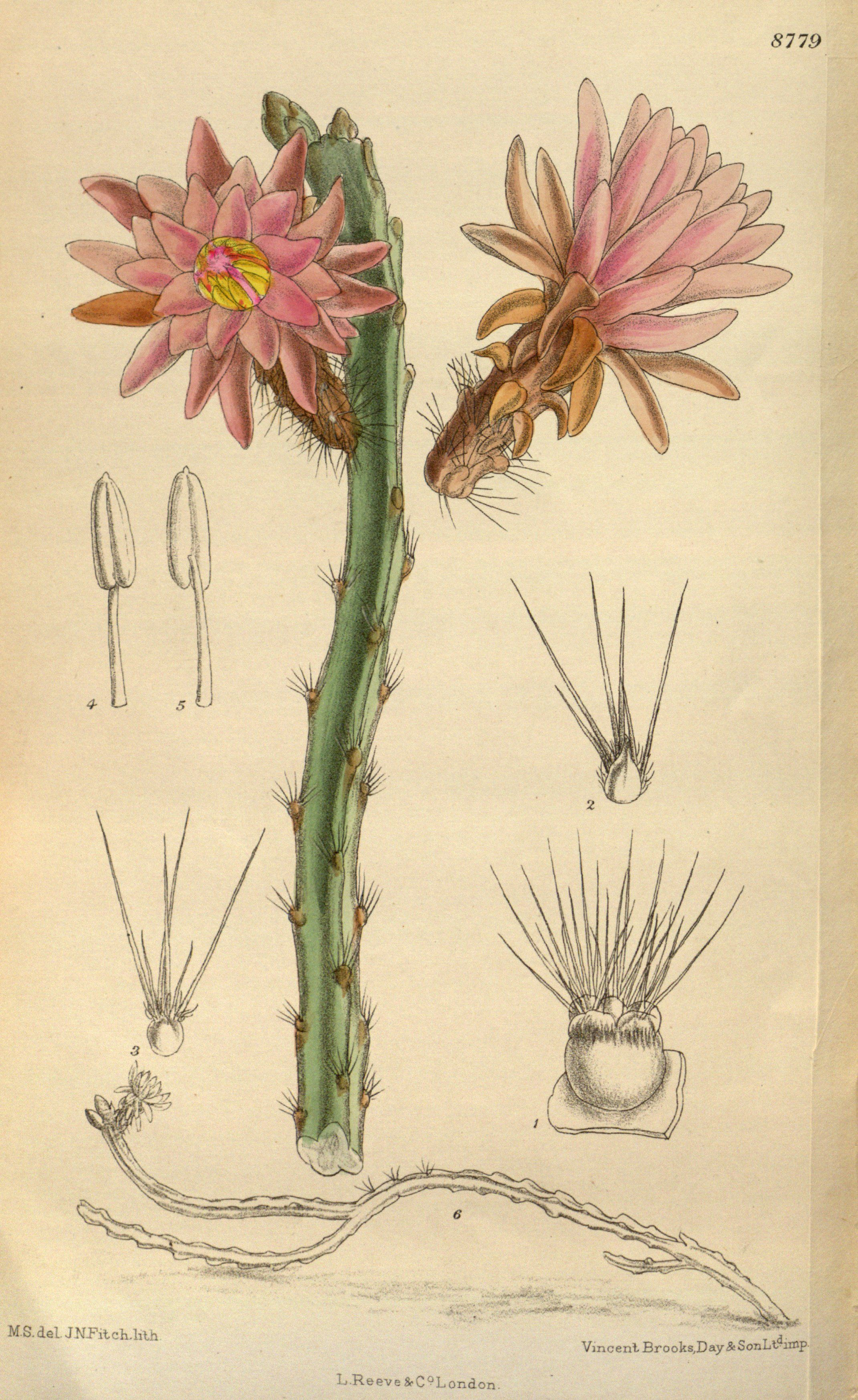

Conservation status
- Least Concern (IUCN 3.1)

Scientific classification
- Kingdom: Plantae
- Clade: Tracheophytes
- Clade: Angiosperms
- Clade: Eudicots
- Order: Caryophyllales
- Family: Cactaceae
- Subfamily: Cactoideae
- Genus: Weberocereus
- Species: W. tunilla

Binomial name
- Weberocereus tunilla (F.A.C.Weber) Britton & Rose

Subspecies
- Weberocereus tunilla subsp. tunilla; Weberocereus tunilla subsp. biolleyi (F.A.C.Weber) Ralf Bauer

Synonyms
- Cereus tunilla F.A.C.Weber

= Weberocereus tunilla =

Species of plant

Weberocereus tunilla is an epiphytic cactus native to Costa Rica, Nicaragua and Panama. It is the type species of Weberocereus. Its flower emits an unpleasant musky smell after opening and is pollinated by bats. The flowers are an example of flagelliflory.
