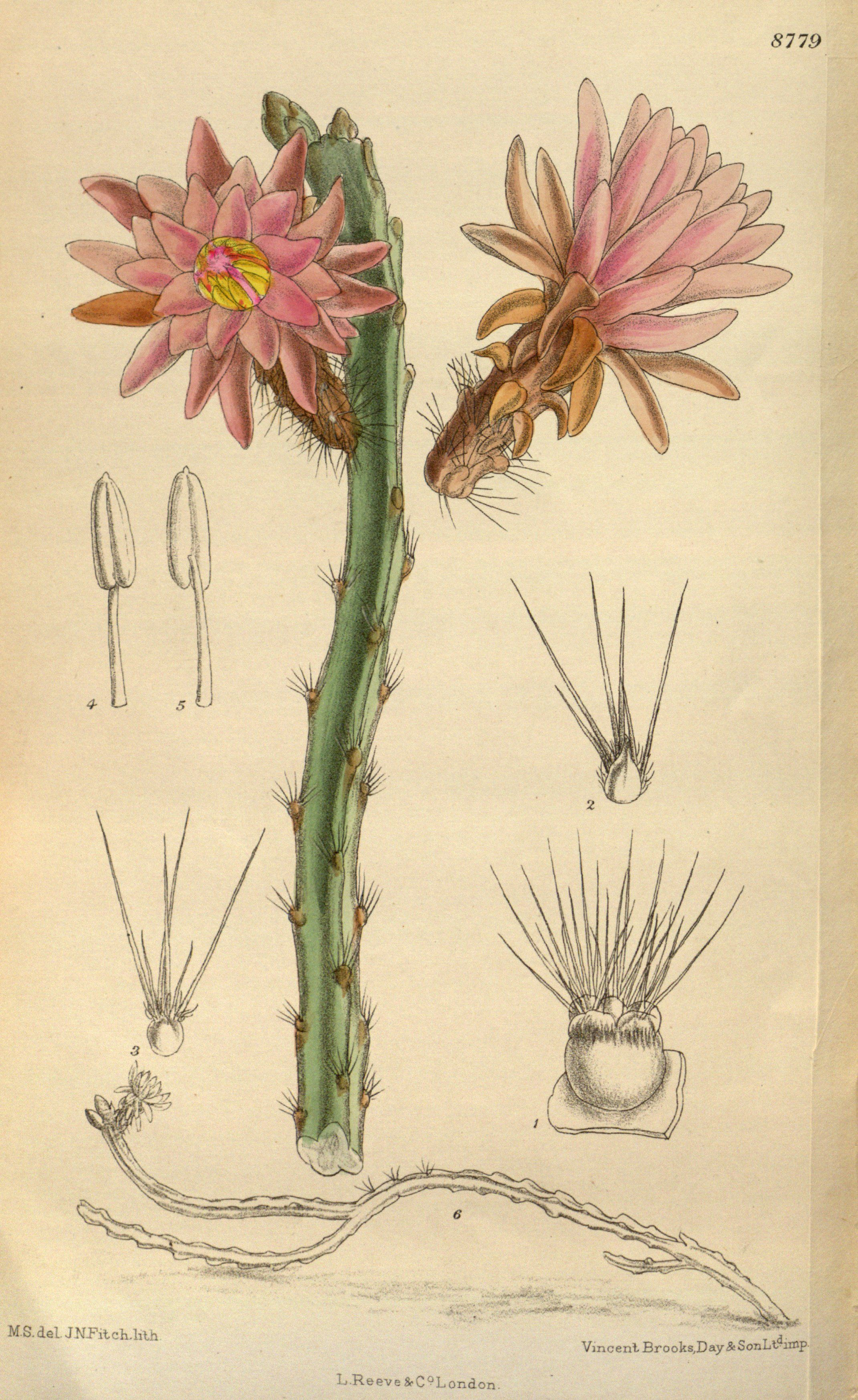
- Weberocereus tunilla

Scientific classification
- Kingdom: Plantae
- Clade: Tracheophytes
- Clade: Angiosperms
- Clade: Eudicots
- Order: Caryophyllales
- Family: Cactaceae
- Subfamily: Cactoideae
- Tribe: Hylocereeae
- Genus: Weberocereus; Britton & Rose

Type species
- Weberocereus tunilla (F.A.C.Weber) Britton & Rose

Species
- See text.

Synonyms
- Eccremocactus Britton & Rose; Eccremocereus Fric & Kreuz. (orth. var.); Werckleocereus Britton & Rose

= Weberocereus =

Genus of cacti

Weberocereus is genus of cacti. It produces a green and white flower and is found mainly in Costa Rica and Nicaragua.

== Description ==
The species of the genus Weberocereus grows climbing or hanging, epiphytic or lithophytic. Their shoots, which are round in cross-section, are angular or flattened. The 2 to 5 ribs have lobed or toothed margins on which are small, sparsely spined areoles. The spines are short and bristly or sometimes absent at all.

The bell-shaped to short funnel-shaped flowers that arise on the side of the shoots are mottled pink to yellowish white to green and 3 to 10 centimeters long. They open at night. The areoles on the pericarp and the flower tube are covered with bristly or hairy spines.

The spherical to oblong, fleshy, often bumpy fruits are red or yellow and bristly or glabrous. They contain white or purple flesh. The remainder of the flowers is perennial. The medium-sized, black-brown to black, slightly shiny seeds are oval and almost smooth. They are up to 1.8 millimeters long and 1.2 millimeters wide

== Species ==
As of November 2022, Plants of the World Online accepted eight species:

Image	Scientific name	Description	Distribution
	Weberocereus alliodorus Gómez-Hin. & H.M.Hern.		Mexico (Oaxaca)
	Weberocereus bradei (Britton & Rose) G.D.Rowley	Stems flat, ca. 12 cm wide, margins crenate, with small spines. Flowers 5.5–7 cm long, 3.5 cm wide, white, nearly spineless.	Costa Rica.
	Weberocereus frohningiorum Ralf Bauer		Costa Rica
	Weberocereus glaber (Eichlam) G.D.Rowley		Mexico to Honduras
	Weberocereus imitans (Kimnach & Hutchison)Buxb.	Stems flat, lobed as in Epiphyllum anguliger, with small spines. Flowers 6–7 cm long, 3–4 cm wide, base moderately spiny.	Costa Rica.
	Weberocereus rosei (Kimnach) Buxb.	Stems flat, 4–8 cm wide, margins crenate. Flowers 5.5–7 cm long, whitish, the lower half densely spiny.	Ecuador.
	Weberocereus trichophorus H.Johnson & Kimnach	Stems nearly cylindrical, spiny and densely hairy. Flower 5.5–6 cm long, pinkish.	Costa Rica
	Weberocereus tunilla (F.A.C.Weber) Britton & Rose	Stems 4(-6)-angled. Flowers 6–7 cm long, pinkish.	Costa Rica.

Some species were transferred to Selenicereus in 2017:

- Weberocereus alliodorus Gómez-Hin. & H.M.Hern. → Selenicereus alliodorus
- Weberocereus glaber (Eichlam) G.D.Rowley → Selenicereus glaber
- Weberocereus tonduzii (F.A.C.Weber) G.D.Rowley → Selenicereus tonduzii
