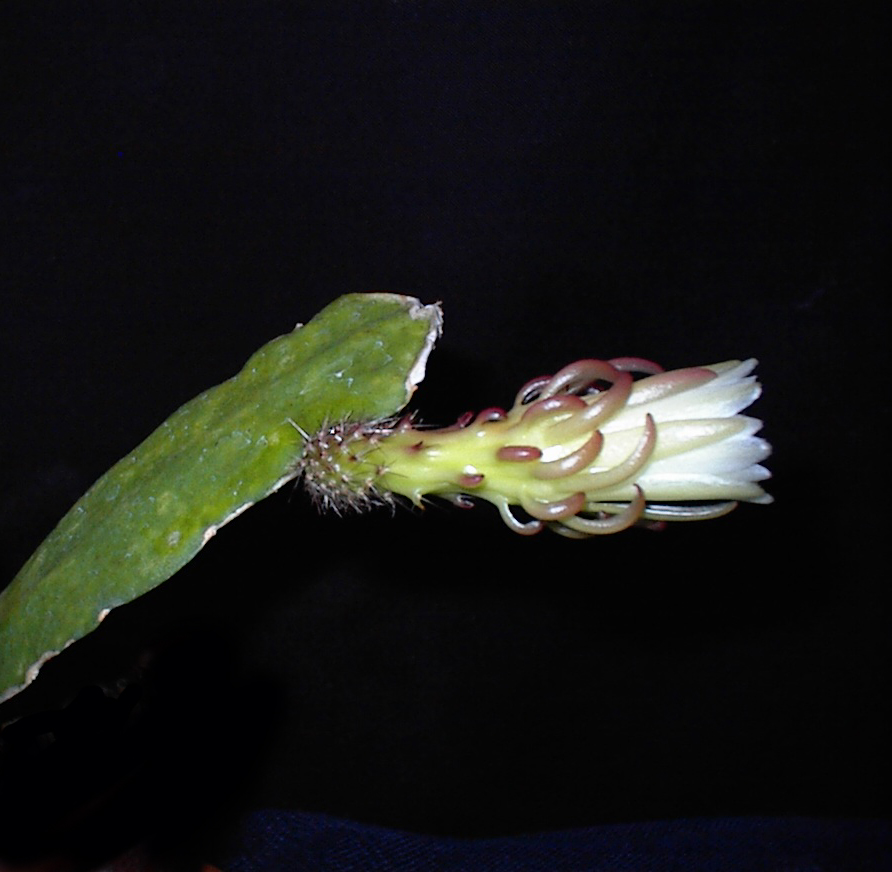
- Flower of Weberocereus rosei

Scientific classification
- Kingdom: Plantae
- Clade: Tracheophytes
- Clade: Angiosperms
- Clade: Eudicots
- Order: Caryophyllales
- Family: Cactaceae
- Subfamily: Cactoideae
- Genus: Weberocereus
- Species: W. rosei

Binomial name
- Weberocereus rosei (Lindley) G. Don

= Weberocereus rosei =

Species of cactus

Weberocereus rosei is a species of cactus from Ecuador.
