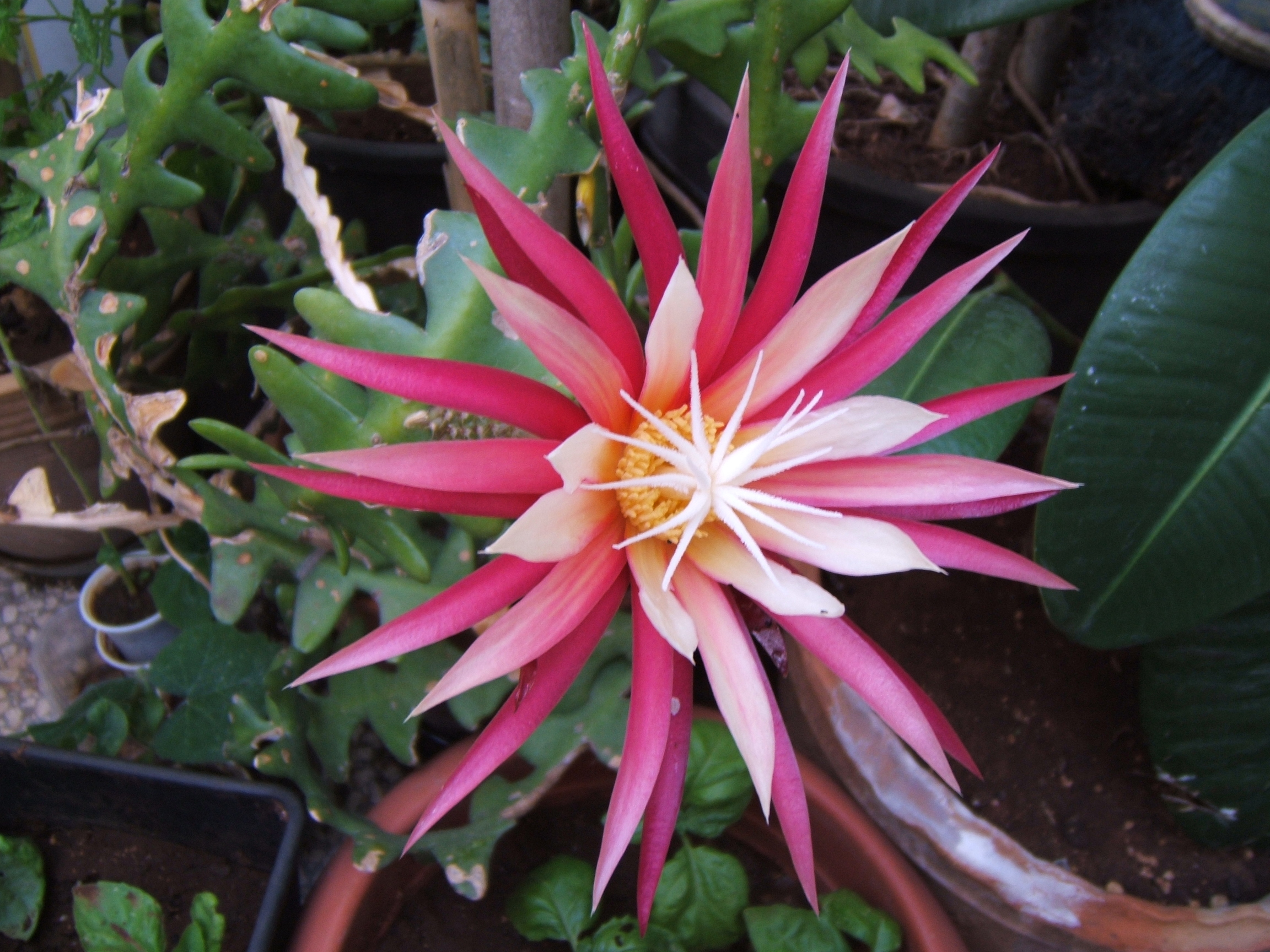
- The flower of Selenicereus anthonyanus

Conservation status
- Least Concern (IUCN 3.1)
- CITES Appendix II

Scientific classification
- Kingdom: Plantae
- Clade: Tracheophytes
- Clade: Angiosperms
- Clade: Eudicots
- Order: Caryophyllales
- Family: Cactaceae
- Subfamily: Cactoideae
- Genus: Selenicereus
- Species: S. anthonyanus

Binomial name
- Selenicereus anthonyanus (Alexander) D. Hunt

Synonyms
- Cryptocereus anthonyanus Alexander (1950) Cact. Succ. Journ. US 22:163-166; Selenicereus anthonyanus(Alexander) D. Hunt (1989) Bradleya 7:93

= Selenicereus anthonyanus =

Fish bone cactus

Species of flowering plant

Selenicereus anthonyanus (also known by its obsolete name, Cryptocereus anthonyanus) is a cactus species native to southern Mexico. It is grown as an ornamental because of its nocturnal flowers and unusual, leaf-like stems. Common names include fishbone cactus, rickrack cactus, zig-zag cactus and St. Anthony's rickrack, and is sometimes referred to as an orchid cactus.

== Description ==
The stems of the plant are ascending or climbing. Its branches are in clusters at intervals along the stem, to 1 m long or more, 7–15 cm wide, flat with few aerial roots; the lobes are 25–45 mm long and 10–16 mm wide, somewhat tapered towards the rounded apex; areoles are small; epidermis is green to yellowish green, smooth. The edges are deeply lobed.

The fragrant flowers are 10 to 12 centimeters long and 15 to 17 centimeters in diameter. The outer bracts are purple and spread out until they are bent back. The inner bracts are ascending, cream-colored and yellow towards the flower throat. The seed vessel is 15–20 mm long and green in color. The pericarpel is covered with numerous small scales with gray wool, bristles and thorns.

The fruits are round or oval and up to 6 cm. They are full of thorny areolae, which drop off as they mature. Seeds are 2 x 1.5 mm, black in color.

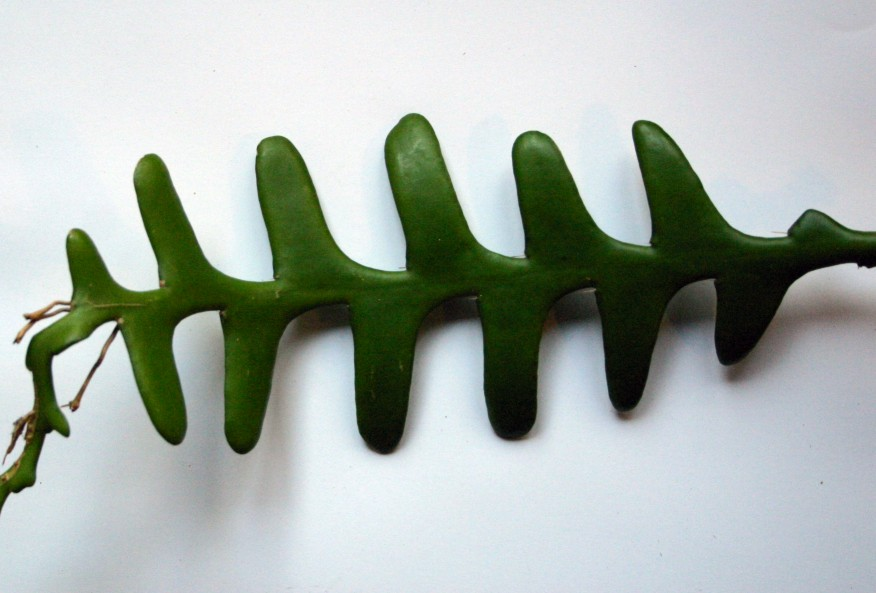
Stem

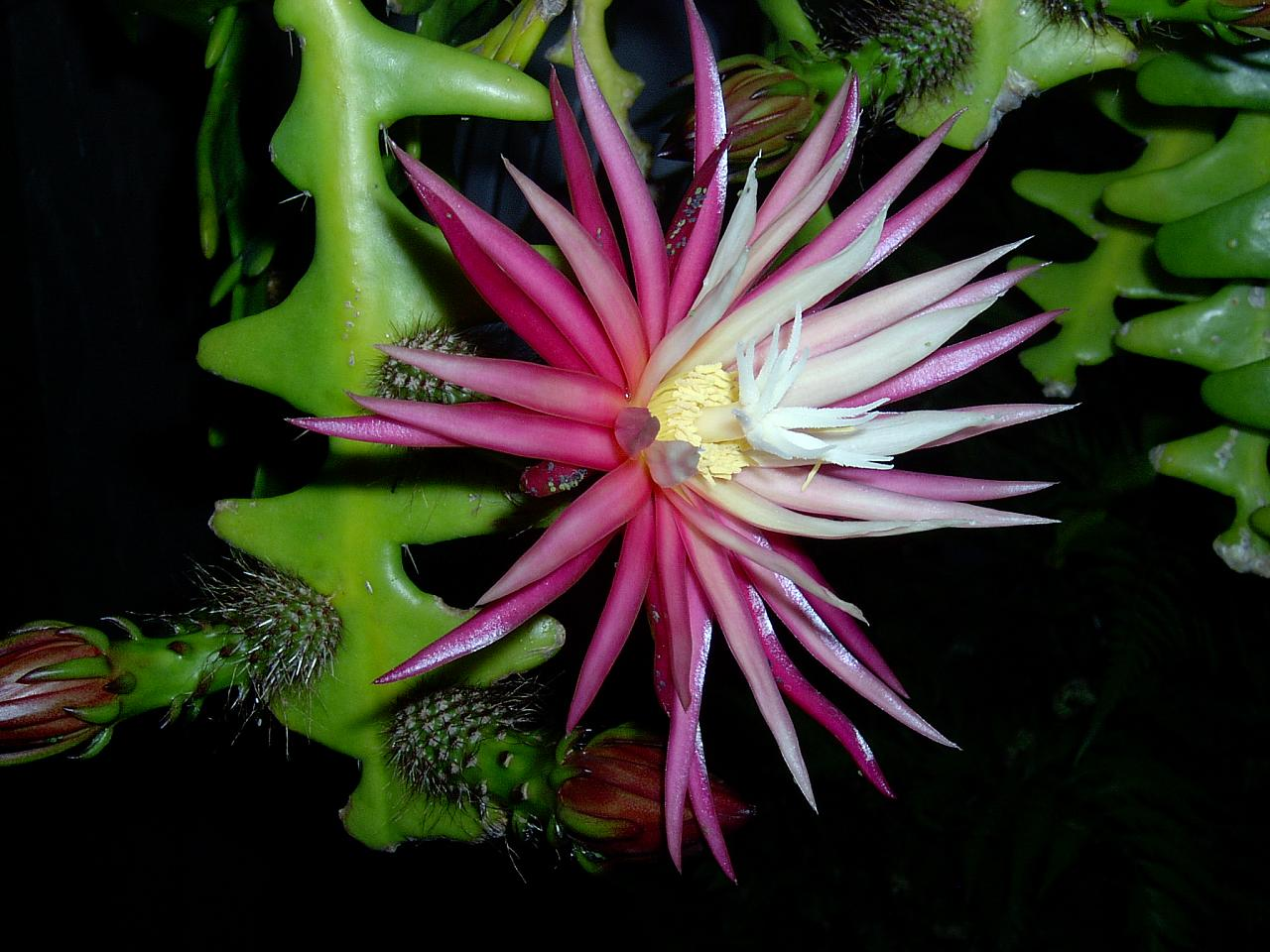
Flower side

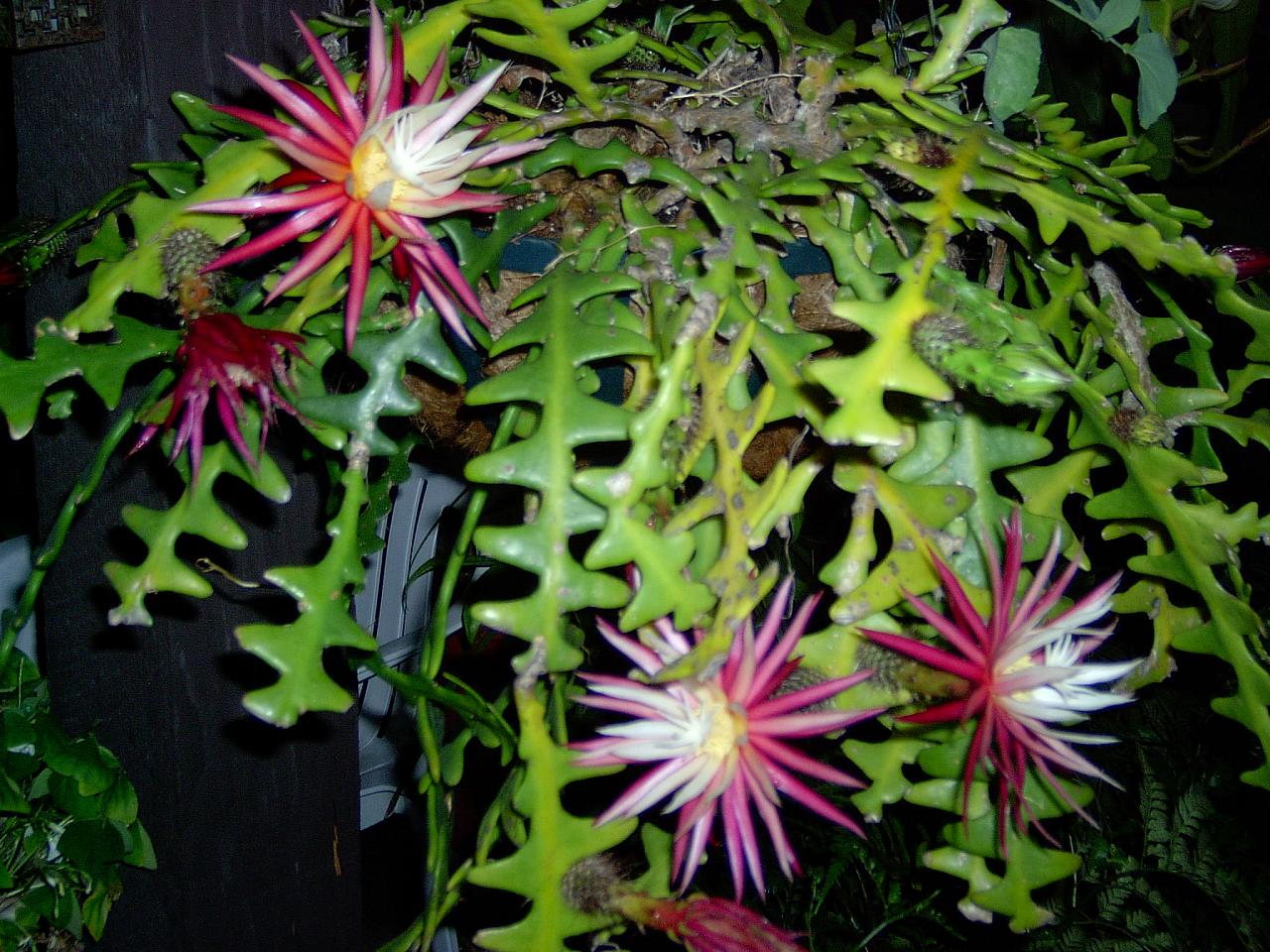
Plant

== Origin and habitat ==
S. anthonyanus is endemic to moist lowland rainforest of southern Mexico, in the states of Chiapas, Oaxaca, Tabasco and Veracruz growing at altitudes of 180 metres (590 ft) to 500 metres (1,600 ft).

== Systematics ==
This species is named after Harold E. Anthony who first flowered this species in June 1950. The former generic name Cryptocereus (literally, "hidden cereus") recalls the fact that the species remained long unknown in a region that had been thoroughly investigated by Thomas MacDougall, who found this species in 1946. He thought he had found a close relative to Epiphyllum anguliger. When it flowered in the greenhouses of Dr. Harold E. Anthony in Jersey in 1950 it was obvious that this was a great novelty. The species is rarely collected and most plants in cultivation descend from this first collection.

This is an isolated species with no close allies. Two other epiphytic cacti from other genera show similar strongly notched flat stems and which, when not in flower, are not readily distinguishable from this species: these are Epiphyllum anguliger and Weberocereus imitans.

== Cultivation ==
An easily cultivated, fast growing epiphyte, S. anthonyanus needs a compost containing plenty of humus and sufficient moisture in summer. It can be grown in semi–shade or full sun, but should not be kept under 4 °C (39 °F) in winter. Extra light in early spring will stimulate budding. Its flowers only open for one night and are very fragrant, to attract nocturnal pollinators. It flowers in late spring or early summer.

== Hybrids ==
- 'Corinna Paetz' (S. anthonyanus × 'Feuerauber')
- ×Disoselenicereus 'Stauch's Mandarin' by Dr. Stauch (Disocactus × smithii × S. anthonyanus)
- ×Disoselenicereus 'Noris' by R. Gräser (Disocactus speciosus × S. anthonyanus).
- ×Disoselenicereus 'Wormatia' by Dr. Stauch (Disocactus × smithii × S. anthonyanus).
- ×Disoselenicereus 'Müllers Mandarin' ('Stauch's Mandarin' × Disocactus speciosus)
