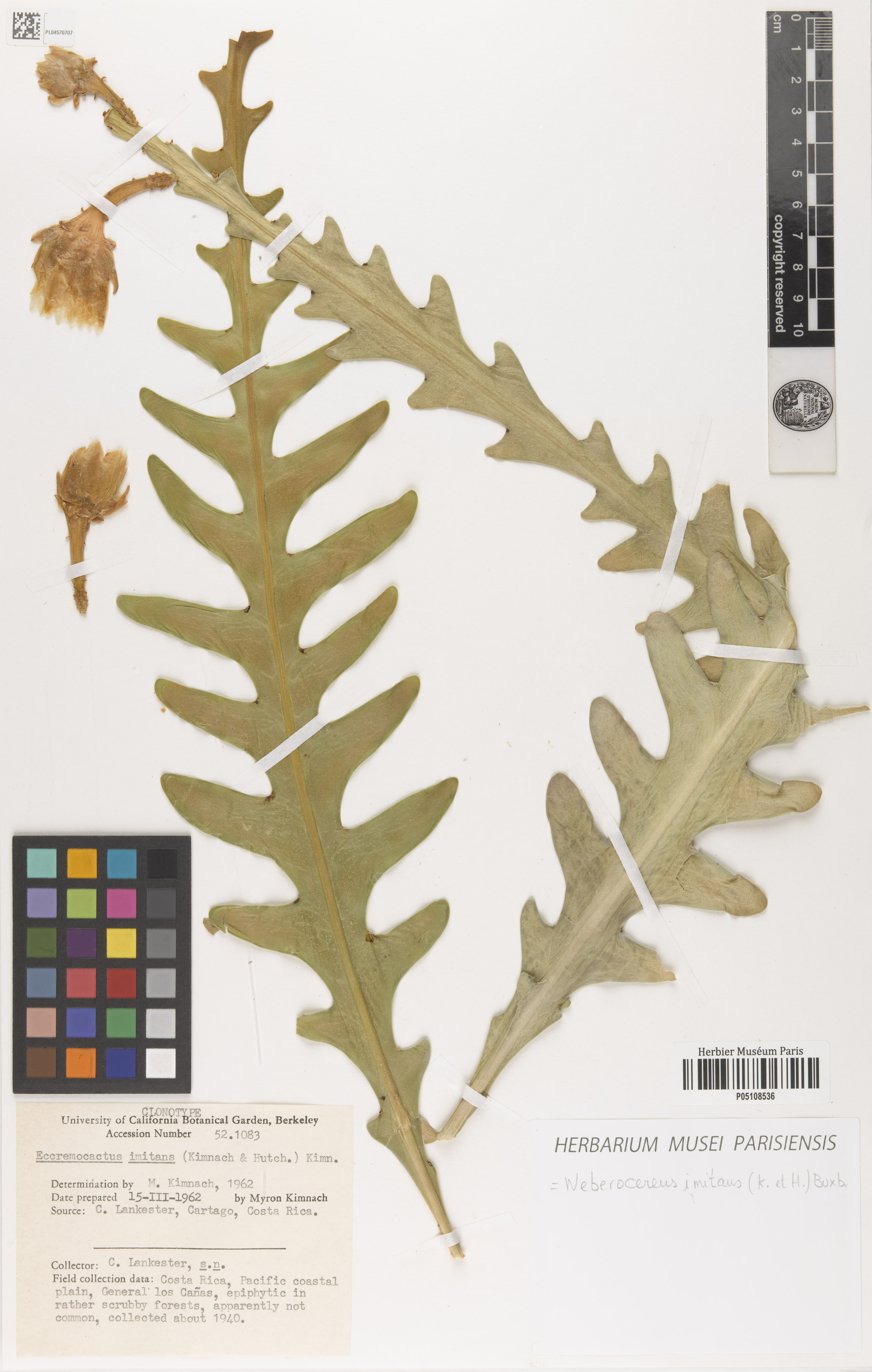

Scientific classification
- Kingdom: Plantae
- Clade: Tracheophytes
- Clade: Angiosperms
- Clade: Eudicots
- Order: Caryophyllales
- Family: Cactaceae
- Subfamily: Cactoideae
- Genus: Weberocereus
- Species: W. imitans

Binomial name
- Weberocereus imitans (Kimnach & Hutchison) Buxb.

Synonyms
- Cryptocereus imitans (Kimnach & Hutchison) Backeb.; Eccremocactus imitans (Kimnach & Hutchison) Kimnach; Weberocereus imitans (Kimnach & Hutchison) D.R.Hunt; Werckleocereus imitans Kimnach & Hutchison

= Weberocereus imitans =

Species of plant

Weberocereus imitans, commonly known as fishbone cactus or zig-zag cactus, is an epiphytic cactus native to Costa Rica. Its flower is small compared with the other two "fishbone cacti", Selenicereus anthonyanus and Disocactus anguliger.
