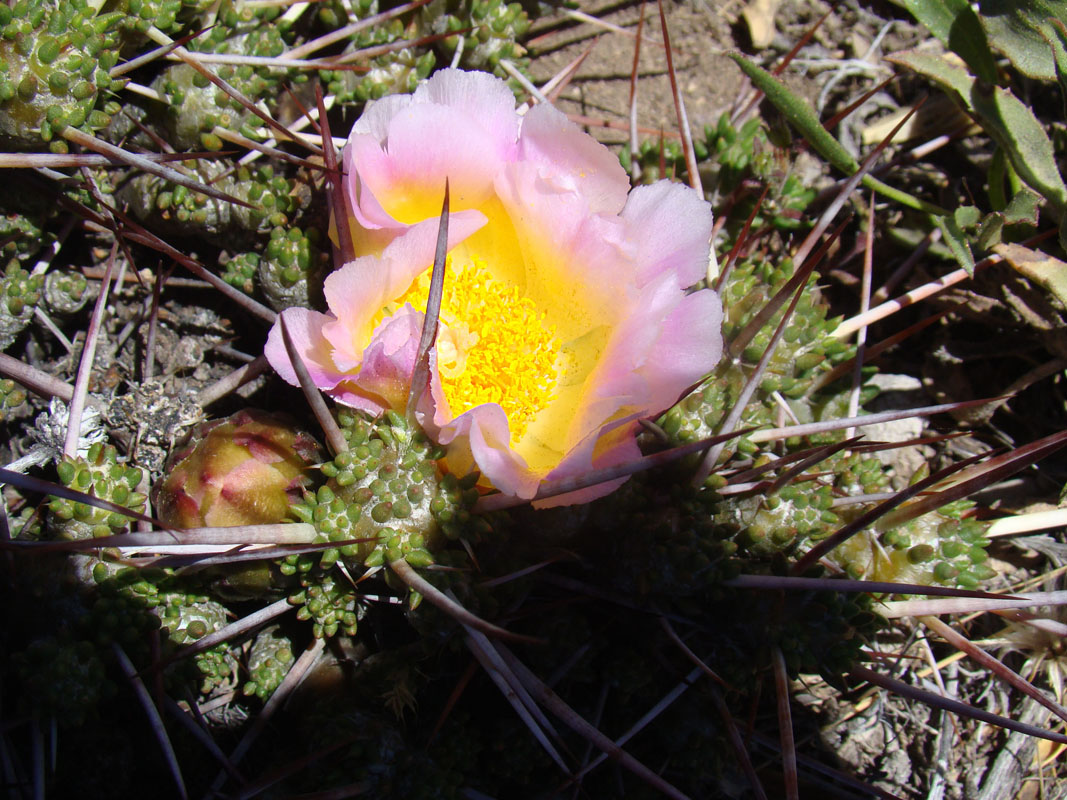

Conservation status
- Least Concern (IUCN 3.1)

Scientific classification
- Kingdom: Plantae
- Clade: Tracheophytes
- Clade: Angiosperms
- Clade: Eudicots
- Order: Caryophyllales
- Family: Cactaceae
- Genus: Maihuenia
- Species: M. patagonica

Binomial name
- Maihuenia patagonica Phil. Britton & Rose

Synonyms
- Opuntia patagonica

= Maihuenia patagonica =

Species of cactus

Maihuenia patagonica, commonly known locally as chupasangre or siempre verde, is a succulent cactus shrub native to Chile and Argentina. Maihuenia patagonica is remarkably tolerant to moisture and cold temperatures.

== Description ==
Maihuenia patagonica forms dense cushions about 30–40 cm (12–16 in) tall and 3 meters in diameter with densely-packed spines. It has a single, 40 cm (16 in) long taproot. The elongated shoots are not segmented and are loosely arranged. They are up to 40 centimeters long and have a diameter of 1 to 2 centimeters. There are numerous button-like to cylindrical, spur-like short shoots. The numerous green leaves are conical, ovoid or linear and circular to elliptical in cross section. They are 2 to 6 millimeters long and 1.5 to 3 millimeters in diameter. The single, stiff central spine is 3 to 7.5 centimeters long. The 2 marginal thorns (rarely only one or completely missing) are sometimes inconspicuous, sometimes lie on the surface of the shoot and are 2 to 8 millimeters long.

It blooms white to violet flowers usually appear terminally on short shoots. The elongated to almost spherical to club-shaped fruits are 2 to 4 centimeters long.

The chromosome count is 2n = 22

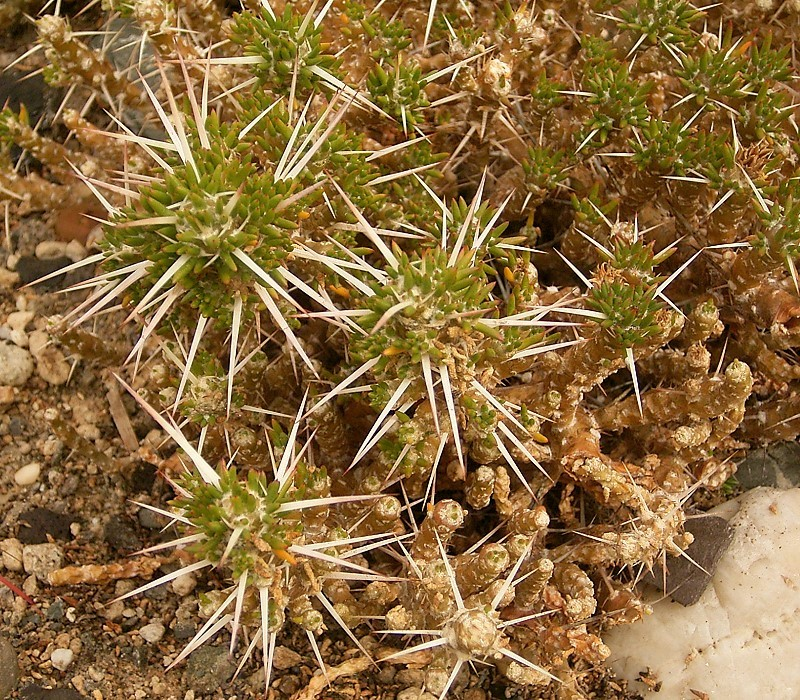
Plants

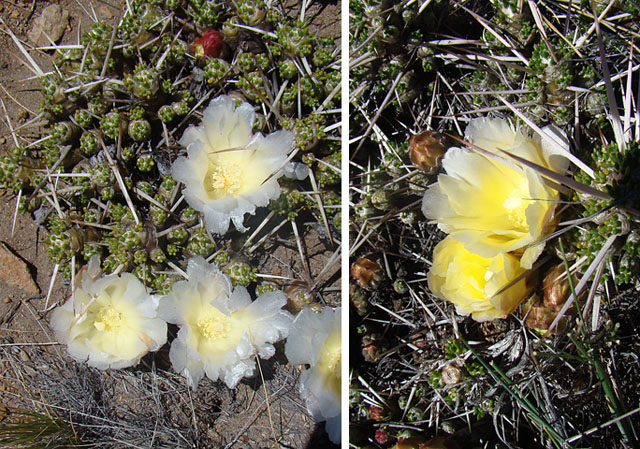
white flowers

== Distribution ==
Maihuenia patagonica is widespread in southern Argentina and Chile at altitudes of up to 500 meters.

== Taxonomy ==
The first description as Opuntia patagonica was published in 1863 by Rudolph Amandus Philippi. The specific epithet patagonica refers to the occurrence of the species in Patagonia. Spanish common names are "Chupa Sangre", "Siempre Verde", and "Yerba del Guanaco". Nathaniel Lord Britton and Joseph Nelson Rose placed it in the genus Maihuenia in 1919.
