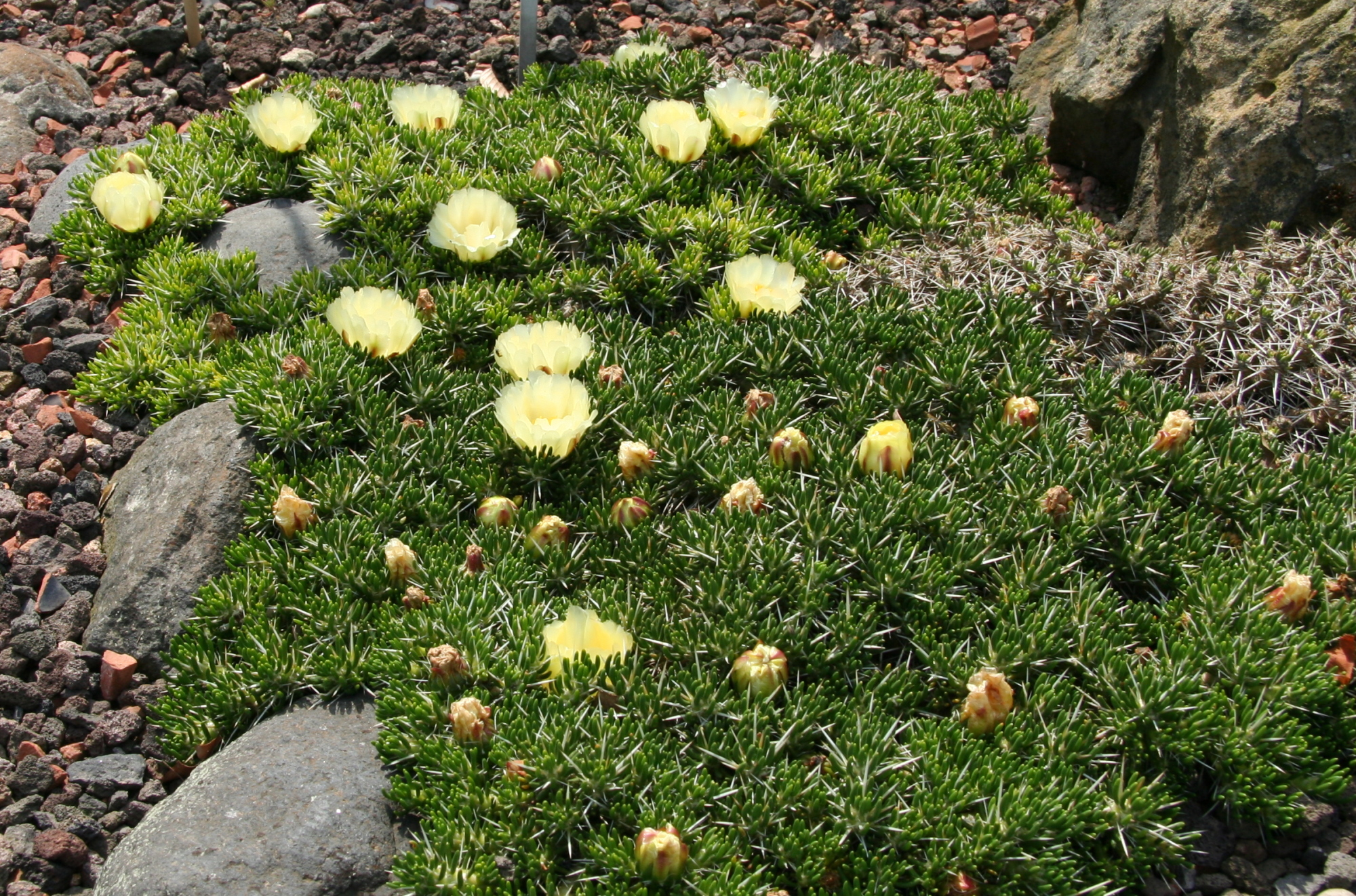

Conservation status
- Least Concern (IUCN 3.1)

Scientific classification
- Kingdom: Plantae
- Clade: Tracheophytes
- Clade: Angiosperms
- Clade: Eudicots
- Order: Caryophyllales
- Family: Cactaceae
- Genus: Maihuenia
- Species: M. poeppigii

Binomial name
- Maihuenia poeppigii (Otto ex Pfeiffer) Phil. ex K. Schum

Synonyms
- Opuntia poeppigii

= Maihuenia poeppigii =

Species of cactus

Maihuenia poeppigii, commonly known in Chile as maihuén or hierba del guanaco, is a succulent cactus shrub from Argentina of a type called a cushion plant. The flowers and fruit are yellow. M. poeppigii is remarkably tolerant to moisture and cold temperatures.

The specific epithet poepigii commemorates Eduard Pöppig, a 19th-century German naturalist who explored South America.

== Description ==
This is a cactus species forming dense cushions often consisting of hundreds of individual segments. The plant's specific physical characteristics are listed below:

- Leaves: Small and succulent.
- Flowers: Showy, large, satiny and lemon-yellow in color. It flowers in late spring.
- Fruit Small, round and yellow.
