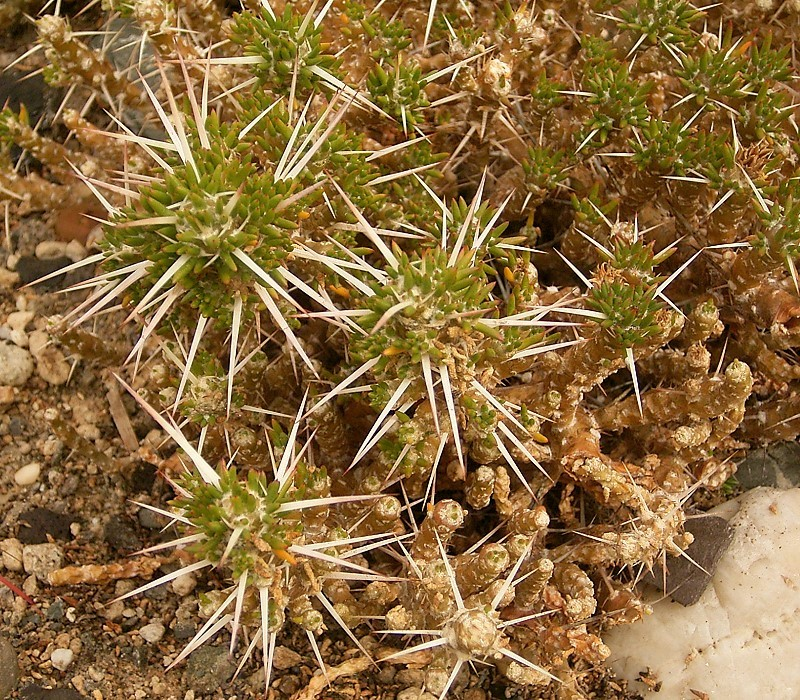
- Maihuenia patagonica

Scientific classification
- Kingdom: Plantae
- Clade: Tracheophytes
- Clade: Angiosperms
- Clade: Eudicots
- Order: Caryophyllales
- Family: Cactaceae
- Subfamily: Maihuenioideae; P.Fearn
- Genus: Maihuenia (Phil. ex F.A.C.Weber) K.Schum.

Species
- Maihuenia patagonica; Maihuenia poeppigii

= Maihuenia =

Genus of cacti

Maihuenia is a genus of cactus (family Cactaceae) and the sole genus of the subfamily Maihuenioideae, which is the smallest subfamily of the Cactaceae. The genus comprises two cushion-forming, mucilaginous species. They are found at high elevation habitats of Andean Argentina and Chile.

Its name is the Latinized version of maihuén, a local Chilean name for these cacti.

== Species ==
Image	Scientific name	Distribution
	Maihuenia patagonica	Southern Chile
	Maihuenia poeppigii	Chile and Argentina
