= Frédéric Albert Constantin Weber =

French botanist

Frédéric Albert Constantin Weber (17 May 1830 in Wolfisheim – 27 July 1903 in Paris) was a French botanist, who specialized in Cactaceae.

In 1852 he received his medical doctorate from the University of Strasbourg with the thesis De l'hémorrhagie des méninges cérébrales. In 1864–67 he served as a military physician on a French military expedition in Mexico.

He is the taxonomic author or co-author of many species of cacti. He also described a few species of agave, including Agave tequilana, the tequila agave (1902). The genus Weberocereus commemorates his name.
