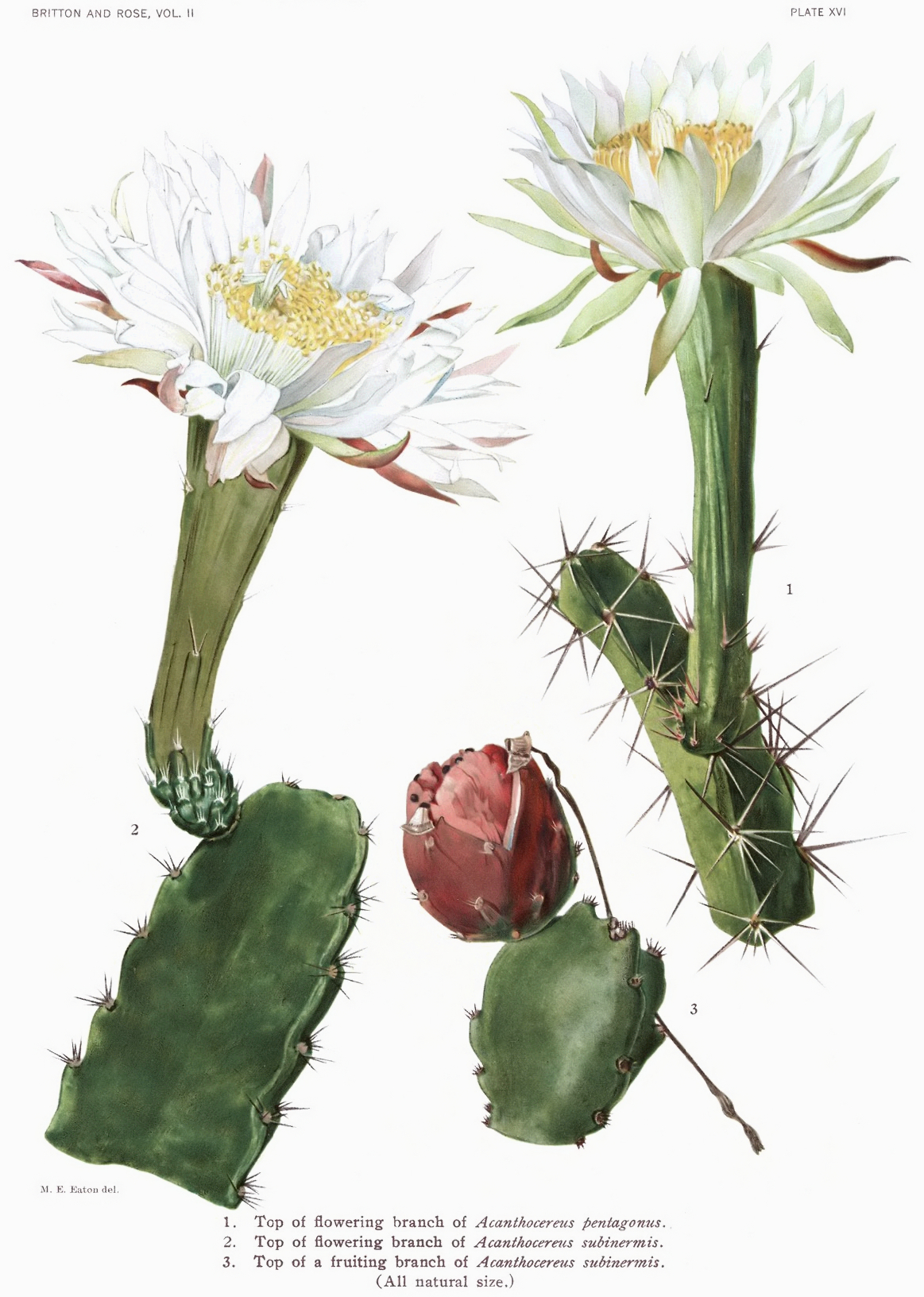
- A. tetragonus flower (right), A. subinermis flower and fruit (left)

Scientific classification
- Kingdom: Plantae
- Clade: Tracheophytes
- Clade: Angiosperms
- Clade: Eudicots
- Order: Caryophyllales
- Family: Cactaceae
- Subfamily: Cactoideae
- Tribe: Hylocereeae
- Genus: Acanthocereus (Engelm. ex A.Berger) Britton & Rose

Type species
- Acanthocereus baxaniensis (now a synonym of Acanthocereus tetragonus)

Species
- See text.

Synonyms
- Monvillea Britton & Rose; Peniocereus subg. Pseudoacanthocereus Sánchez-Mejorada

= Acanthocereus =

Genus of cacti

Acanthocereus is a genus of cacti. Its species take the form of shrubs with arching or climbing stems up to several meters in height. The generic name is derived from the Greek word άκανθα (acantha), meaning spine, and the Latin word cereus, meaning candle. The genus is native to the mostly tropical Americas from Texas and the southern tip of Florida to the northern part of South America (Colombia and Venezuela), including islands of the Caribbean.

== Description ==
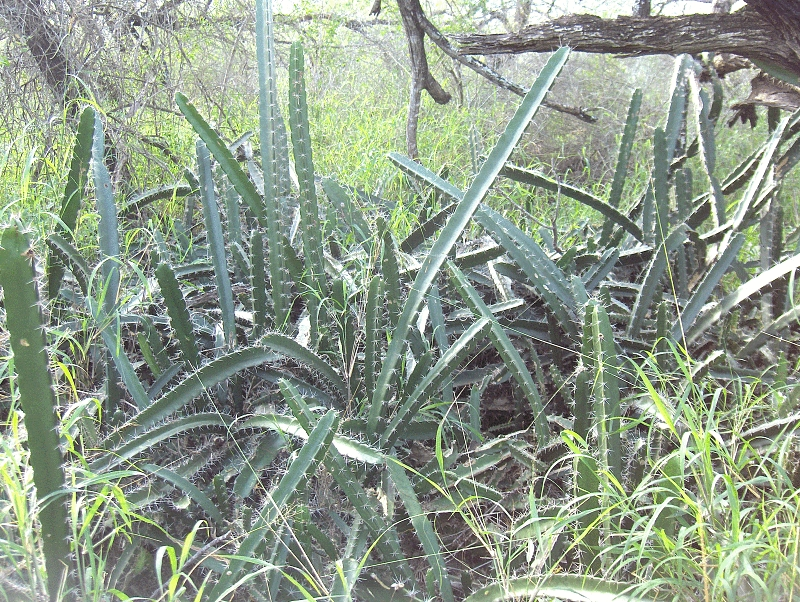
Barbed-wire cactus habit

The plants form bushes which later usually overhanging or spreading and are rarely tree-shaped. Stems have 3 to 5 ribs, typically thin, with stout spines. The large, white, funnel-shaped flowers are night-opening, 12–25 cm (4.7–9.8 in) long and 6–12 cm (2.4–4.7 in) in diameter and open at night. The little scaly pericarpel and the long, stiff, upright flower tube are covered with a few thorns that soon decay and little wool. The fruits are spherical to ovoid or pear-shaped red or green, bare or thorny, tear-open or non-tear-open and contain broadly oval, shiny black seeds of up to 4.8 millimeter.

== Taxonomy ==
The name was first used by George Engelmann in 1863, although he did not describe its characters, leaving it to Alwin Berger in 1905 to define it as a subsection of Cereus. In 1909, Nathaniel Britton and Joseph Nelson Rose elevated Acanthocereus to a genus.

=== Species ===
As of 2025, Plants of the World Online accepted the following species:

Image	Scientific name	Distribution
	Acanthocereus atropurpureus Gonz.-Zam. & Dan.Sánchez	Jalisco
	Acanthocereus canoensis (P.R.House, Gómez-Hin. & H.M.Hern.) S.Arias & N.Korotkova	Honduras.
	Acanthocereus castellae (Sánchez-Mej.) Lodé	Mexico (Jalisco to Guerrero)
	Acanthocereus chiapensis Bravo	Mexico (Chiapas) to Honduras
	Acanthocereus cuixmalensis (Sánchez-Mej.) Lodé	Mexico (Jalisco to Michoacán)
	Acanthocereus fosterianus (Cutak) Lodé	Mexico (Guerrero, Oaxaca, Chiapas)
	Acanthocereus haackeanus Backeb. ex Lodé	Mexico
	Acanthocereus hesperius D.R.Hunt	Mexico (Oaxaca)
	Acanthocereus hirschtianus (K.Schum.) Lodé	Costa Rica, El Salvador, Guatemala, Honduras, Nicaragua
	Acanthocereus lempirensis H. Vega, Gómez-Hin. & H.M. Hern.	Honduras
	Acanthocereus macdougallii (Cutak) Lodé	Mexico (Oaxaca, Chiapas)
	Acanthocereus maculatus Weingart ex Bravo	Mexico
	Acanthocereus oaxacensis (Britton & Rose) Lodé	Mexico (Oaxaca)
	Acanthocereus paradoxus Gonz.-Zam. & Dan.Sánchez	Mexico (Jalisco)
	Acanthocereus rosei (J.G.Ortega) Lodé	Mexico (Sinaloa to Michoacán)
	Acanthocereus tepalcatepecanus (Sánchez-Mej.) Lodé	Mexico (Jalisco, Michoacán, Guerrero)
	Acanthocereus tetragonus (L.) Hummelinck	Belize, Colombia, Costa Rica, Cuba, El Salvador, Guatemala, Honduras, Mexico, Netherlands Antilles Nicaragua, Panamá, United States (Texas, Florida) Trinidad-Tobago, Venezuela,

Species formerly placed in the genus that have been moved to other genera include:

- Acanthocereus brasiliensis Britton & Rose → Strophocactus brasiliensis
- Acanthocereus sicariguensis Croizat & Tamayo → Strophocactus sicariguensis

== Distribution ==
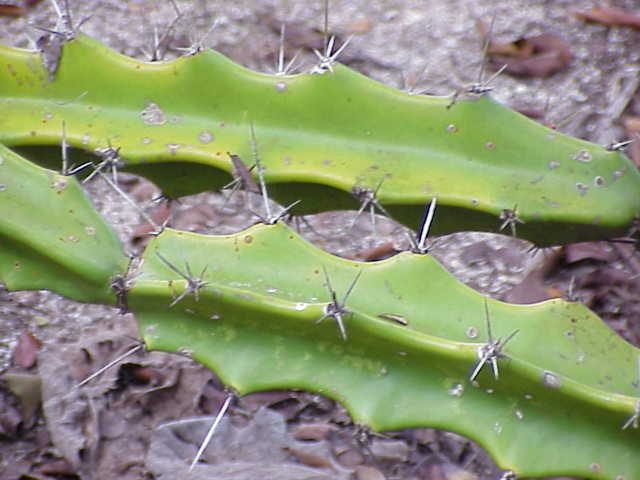
Barbed-wire Cactus stem

Acanthocereus tetragonus, commonly known as Barbed-wire Cactus, Chaco, Nun-tsusuy, or Órgano, is the most widespread of the genus and the largest, reaching 2–7 m (6.6–23.0 ft) tall.
