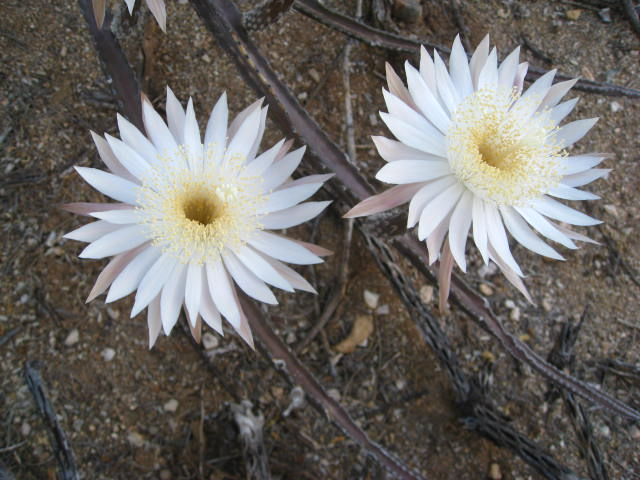
- Peniocereus greggii flower

Scientific classification
- Kingdom: Plantae
- Clade: Tracheophytes
- Clade: Angiosperms
- Clade: Eudicots
- Order: Caryophyllales
- Family: Cactaceae
- Subfamily: Cactoideae
- Tribe: Echinocereeae
- Genus: Peniocereus (A.Berger) Britton & Rose

Synonyms
- Cullmannia Distefano; Neoevansia W.T.Marshall; Nyctocereus (A.Berger) Britton & Rose

= Peniocereus =

Genus of plants

Peniocereus is a genus of vining cacti, comprising about 18 species, found from the southwestern United States and Mexico. They have a large underground tuber, thin and inconspicuous stems. Its name comes from the prefix penio- (from the Latin penis, meaning ‘tail’) and Cereus, the large genus from which it was split.

Known as the desert night-blooming cereus, it also shares its common names of "night-blooming cereus" and "queen of the night" with many other similar cacti.

== Taxonomy ==
Peniocereus was first described in 1905 by Alwin Berger as a subgenus of Cereus with a single species, Cereus greggii. This taxon was elevated to the genus level as Peniocereus greggii by Britton and Rose in 1909. Later in 1974 an infrageneric classification was constructed based on morphological features that split Peniocereus into two subgenera: Peniocereus and Pseudoacanthocereus. In 2005 a molecular phylogenetic study of the genus supported this split and showed that Peniocereus is not monophyletic.

== Species ==
Species include:

=== Peniocereus sensu stricto ===
Molecular phylogeny supported the position of this subgenus within Echinocereeae.

| Image | Scientific name | Distribution |
|---|---|---|
| | Peniocereus greggii(Engelm.) Britton & Rose | United States (Arizona, New Mexico, Texas), Mexico |
| | Peniocereus johnstoniiBritton & Rose | Mexico (Baja California Sur) |
| | Peniocereus lazaro-cardenasii(J.L.Contr., J.Jiménez Ram., Sánchez-Mej. & C.A.Toledo) D.R.Hunt | Mexico (Guerrero, Michoacan de Ocampo) |
| | Peniocereus marianus(Gentry) Sánchez-Mej. | Mexico (Sinaloa, Sonora) |
| | Peniocereus papillosus (Britton & Rose) U.Guzmán | Sinaola |
| | Peniocereus striatus – gearstem cactus | Mexico (Baja California, Sinaloa, and Sonora) and United States (Arizona) |
| | Peniocereus viperinus | Mexico (Morelos, Puebla) |
| | Peniocereus zopilotensis | Mexico (Guerrero) |

== Formerly included species ==
=== Nyctocereus ===
The 2005 molecular study showed that P. serpentinus is in Echinocereeae along with subgenus Peniocereus, but suggests resurrecting the monotopic Nyctocereus as it is sister to Bergerocactus.

| Image | Scientific name | Distribution | Former name |
|---|---|---|---|
| | Nyctocereus serpentinus | Mexico (Michoacan de Ocampo, Morelos, Oaxaca) | Peniocereus sepentinus |

=== Subgenus Pseudoacanthocereus (Now Acanthocereus) ===
Molecular phylogeny and morphological evidence suggests this subgenus is more closely related to Acanthocereus.

| Image | Scientific name | Distribution | Former name |
|---|---|---|---|
| | Acanthocereus castellae | Mexico (Colima, Jalisco, Michoacan de Ocampo) | Peniocereus castellae |
| | Acanthocereus cuixmalensis | Mexico (Colima, Jalisco, Michoacan de Ocampo) | Peniocereus cuixmalensis |
| | Acanthocereus fosterianus | Mexico (Chiapas, Colima, Guerrero, Oaxaca) | Peniocereus fosterianus |
| | Acanthocereus hirschtianus | Costa Rica, El Salvador, Guatemala, Nicaragua | Peniocereus hirschtianus |
| | Acanthocereus macdougallii | Mexico (Oaxaca) | Peniocereus macdougallii |
| | Acanthocereus maculatus | Mexico ( Guerrero) | Peniocereus maculatus |
| | Acanthocereus oaxacensis | Mexico (Oaxaca) | Peniocereus oaxacensis |
| | Acanthocereus rosei | Mexico (Jalisco, Sinaloa) | Peniocereus rosei |
| | Acanthocereus tepalcatepecanus | Mexico (Michoacan de Ocampo) | Peniocereus tepalcatepecanus |
