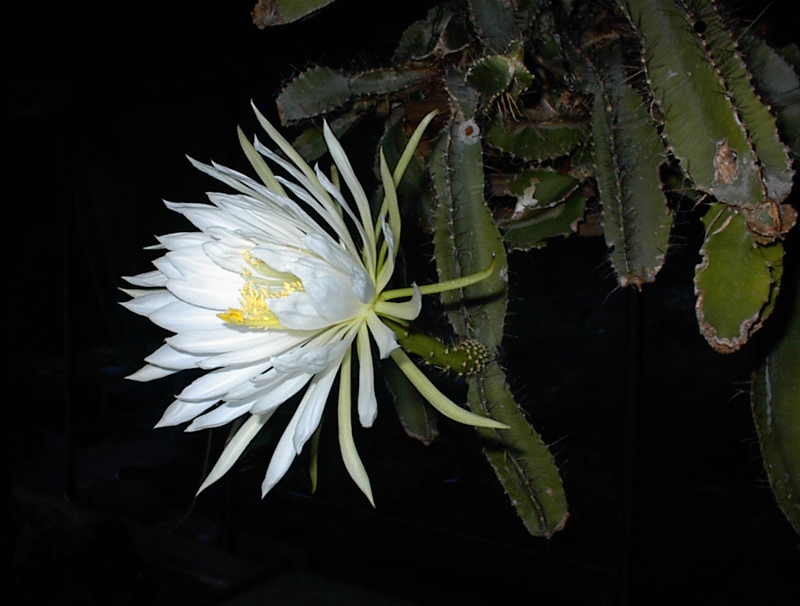
- Deamia testudo

Scientific classification
- Kingdom: Plantae
- Clade: Tracheophytes
- Clade: Angiosperms
- Clade: Eudicots
- Order: Caryophyllales
- Family: Cactaceae
- Subfamily: Cactoideae
- Tribe: Echinocereeae
- Genus: Deamia; Britton & Rose

Species
- See text.

= Deamia =

Genus of flowering plants

Deamia is a genus of cacti. Its species are native from south Mexico through Central America to Nicaragua. Its species have been placed in Selenicereus and Strophocactus.

== Description ==
Species of Deamia are climbing or pendent shrubs. Their flowers have hairs and spines and are followed by red fruit with clear pulp.

== Taxonomy ==
The genus was erected by Nathaniel Lord Britton and Joseph Nelson Rose in 1920, with the single species Deamia testudo. The name honours Charles C. Deam, a plant collector who sent the plant to Britton and Rose. It was treated as a distinct monotypic genus until 1965, when Franz Buxbaum merged it into Selenicereus. Alexander Doweld revived the genus in 2002, adding the species then treated as Selenicereus chontalensis. Molecular phylogenetic studies in 2017 (based on the two species then known) and in 2018 (three species) confirmed the monophyly of the genus. It was placed in the tribe Echinocereeae, subtribe Pachycereinae. It was one of the early diverging members of the tribe in the cladograms obtained in the 2018 study, with the species related as follows:

- Deamia
  - Deamia testudo
  - - Deamia montalvoae
    - Deamia chontalensis
    - Deamia funis

=== Species ===
Two species were accepted in a 2017 study of the tribe Hylocereeae which revived the genus Deamia. A third species was described in 2018. A new species Deamia funis was discovered in 2022

Image	Scientific name	Distribution
	Deamia chontalensis (Alexander) Doweld	southwestern Mexico and Guatemala
	Deamia funis Hammel & S.Arias	Nicaragua
	Deamia montalvoae Cerén, J.Menjívar & S.Arias	southeastern Mexico, Guatemala and El Salvador.
	Deamia testudo (Karwinsky ex Zuccarini) Britton & Rose	southern Mexico through Central America to Nicaragua.

As of March 2021, Plants of the World Online still placed D. chontalensis in the genus Selenicereus.
