= Strophocactus sicariguensis =

Scientific classification
- Kingdom: Plantae
- Clade: Tracheophytes
- Clade: Angiosperms
- Clade: Eudicots
- Order: Caryophyllales
- Family: Cactaceae
- Subfamily: Cactoideae
- Genus: Strophocactus
- Species: S. sicariguensis

Binomial name
- Strophocactus sicariguensis (Croizat & Tamayo) S.Arias & N.Korotkova

Synonyms
- Acanthocereus sicariguensis Croizat & Tamayo; Pseudoacanthocereus sicariguensis (Croizat & Tamayo) N.P.Taylor

Species of cactus

Strophocactus sicariguensis, synonym Pseudoacanthocereus sicariguensis, is a species of plant in the family Cactaceae. It is native to Colombia and Venezuela. It has often sprawling thin stems and white funnel-shaped flowers that open at night.

== Description ==
Strophocactus sicariguensis grows as a shrub, initially upright and later sprawling. It branches freely from the base. The thin stems are up to 2 m (6 ft 7 in) long and 3 cm (1.2 in) across and have 2–5 ribs bearing areoles with spines up to 2 cm (0.8 in) long. The white funnel-shaped flowers open at night and are up to 16 cm (6.3 in) long.

== Taxonomy ==
Strophocactus sicariguensis was first described, as Acanthocereus sicariguensis, in 1947. It was transferred to the genus Pseudoacanthocereus as Pseudoacanthocereus sicariguensis by Nigel P. Taylor in 1992, a placement still accepted by some sources as of February 2021. A molecular phylogenetic study of the Hylocereeae by Korotkova et al. published in 2017 showed that Pseudoacanthocereus sicariguensis formed a clade with Strophocactus wittii and Pseudoacanthocereus brasiliensis (the only other species placed in Pseudoacanthocereus):

- - Neoraimondia herzogiana
  - - Pseudoacanthocereus brasiliensis
    - - Pseudoacanthocereus sicariguensis
      - Strophocactus wittii

Accordingly, both species of Pseudoacanthocereus were transferred to Strophocactus.

== Distribution ==
Strophocactus sicariguensis is native to Colombia and Venezuela, in particular around the Maracaibo Basin.
