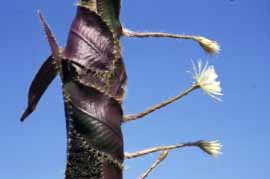
- Strophocactus wittii

Scientific classification
- Kingdom: Plantae
- Clade: Tracheophytes
- Clade: Angiosperms
- Clade: Eudicots
- Order: Caryophyllales
- Family: Cactaceae
- Subfamily: Cactoideae
- Tribe: Echinocereeae
- Genus: Strophocactus; Britton & Rose

Species
- See text.

Synonyms
- Strophocereus Fric & Kreuz.; Selenicereus sect. Strophocactus (Britton & Rose) D.R.Hunt

= Strophocactus =

Genus of cacti

Strophocactus is a genus of cacti in the subfamily Cactoideae. Its status and circumscription remain somewhat uncertain, with the genus containing one to three species (not always the same ones). Molecular phylogenetic data suggest that it consists of three species, including two formerly comprising the genus Pseudoacanthocereus. With this circumscription, the species have different growth habits, but share similarities in their flowers, which are white and open at night.

== Description ==
As circumscribed by Korotkova et al. in 2017, the three species of Strophocactus have tubular to funnel-shaped flowers with tubercules arranged in ribs and areoles with bristles. The flowers are white and open at night. They are followed by yellow to brown fruits. Two species (S. brasiliensis and S. sicariguensis) are scrambling or decumbent shrubs, with thin stems (up to 4.5 cm across) and tuberous roots. S. sicariguensis sometimes has flattened stem segments. The third species, S. wittii, is an epiphyte with flattened stems that cling to the trunks of trees using aerial roots.

== Taxonomy ==
The genus was erected by Nathaniel L. Britton & Joseph N. Rose in 1913 with only one species, Strophocactus wittii. In 1989, David Hunt reduced Stophocactus to a section of the genus Selenicereus, Selenicereus sect. Strophocactus, so that the species became Selenicereus wittii. In 2003, Ralf Bauer proposed restoring the genus Strophocactus, adding two further species (S. chontalensis and S. testudo). He excluded Stophocactus from the Hylocereeae. Bauer's actions were based on unpublished DNA sequence data. A molecular phylogenetic study of the Hylocereeae in 2017 showed that in neither Hunt's nor Bauer's approach were Strophocactus and Selinicereus monophyletic:

- - Clade including Selinicereus wittii = Strophocactus wittii
  - - Clade including Strophocactus chontalensis and Strophocactus testudo
    - Re-circumscribed tribe Hylocereeae, including Selenicereus species

Selenicereus wittii formed a clade with two species then placed in Pseudoacanthocereus:

- - Neoraimondia herzogiana
  - - Pseudoacanthocereus brasiliensis
    - - Pseudoacanthocereus sicariguensis
      - Selenicereus wittii

Accordingly, the authors followed Bauer in placing Selenicereus wittii back in Strophocactus, but now together with the two former Pseudoacanthocereus species. Like Bauer, they excluded the revised genus Strophocactus from the Hylocereeae, placing it in the tribe Echinocereeae.

=== Species ===
As of September 2026, Plants of the World Online accepts the following four species:

Image	Scientific name	Distribution
	Strophocactus brasiliensis (Britton & Rose) S.Arias & N.Korotkova, syn. Pseudoacanthocereus brasiliensis (Britton & Rose) F. Ritter	Brazil
	Strophocactus krammii Ostolaza, Pino & M.Fernández	Peru (Loreto)
	Strophocactus sicariguensis (Croizat & Tamayo) S.Arias & N.Korotkova, syn. Pseudoacanthocereus sicariguensis (Croizat & Tamayo) N.P.Taylor	Colombia, Venezuela
	Strophocactus wittii (K.Schumann) Britton & Rose, syn. Selenicereus wittii (K.Schumann) Rowley	North Brazil, Colombia, Ecuador, Peru, Venezuela

Species formerly included in Strophocactus are:

- Strophocactus chontalensis (Alexander) Ralf Bauer = Deamia chontalensis (Alexander) Doweld
- Strophocactus testudo (Karw. ex Zucc.) Buxb. ex Krainz = Deamia testudo (Karw. ex Zucc.) Britton & Rose
