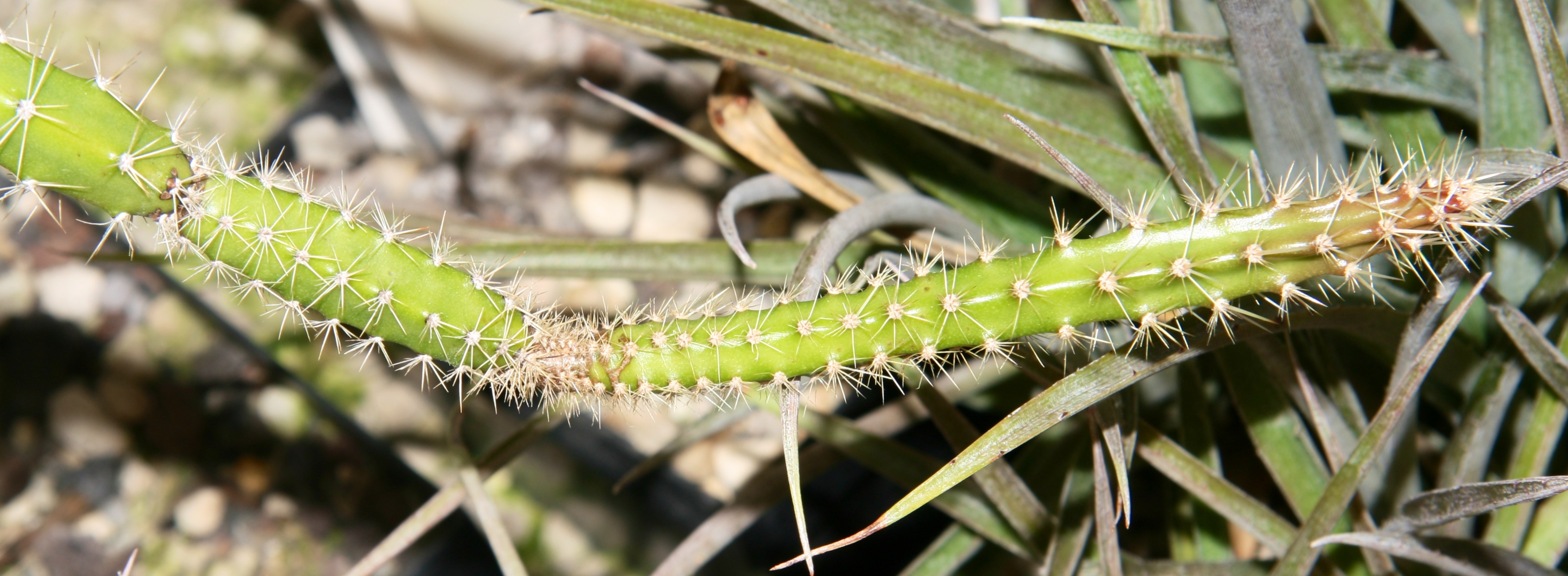

Conservation status
- Vulnerable (IUCN 3.1)

Scientific classification
- Kingdom: Plantae
- Clade: Tracheophytes
- Clade: Angiosperms
- Clade: Eudicots
- Order: Caryophyllales
- Family: Cactaceae
- Subfamily: Cactoideae
- Genus: Strophocactus
- Species: S. brasiliensis

Binomial name
- Strophocactus brasiliensis (Britton & Rose) S.Arias & N.Korotkova

Synonyms
- Acanthocereus brasiliensis Britton & Rose; Pseudoacanthocereus boreominarum Rizzini & A.Mattos; Pseudoacanthocereus brasiliensis (Britton & Rose) F.Ritter

= Strophocactus brasiliensis =

Species of cactus

Strophocactus brasiliensis is a species of cactus also known by its synonym Pseudoacanthocereus brasiliensis. It is endemic to Brazil. Its natural habitats are tropical and subtropical dry broadleaf forests and savanna. It is threatened by habitat loss.

== Description ==
Strophocactus brasiliensis grows as a shrub. It initially grows upright but is sprawling when mature. It branches freely. The thin, bright green stems are up to 3 cm (1.2 in) across and have 2–7 ribs bearing small areoles with many needle-like spines 2–4 cm (1–2 in) apart. These spines are white with a brown tip and are up to 3 cm (1.2 in) long. The white, funnel-shaped flowers are 12–23 cm (5–9 in) long and 11–12 cm (4–5 in) across. They open at night. The spherical, slightly tuberculate fruits are initially green and become yellow when ripe. The fruits, which are approximately 8 cm (3 in) in diameter, are covered in clusters of spines and contain a greenish-white pulp. The seeds are large and brownish.

== Taxonomy ==
Strophocactus brasiliensis was first described, as Acanthocereus brasiliensis, by Britton and Rose in 1920. It was transferred to the genus Pseudoacanthocereus as Pseudoacanthocereus brasiliensis by Friedrich Ritter in 1979, a placement still accepted by some sources as of February 2021. A 2017 molecular phylogenetic study of the Hylocereeae by Korotkova et al. showed that Pseudoacanthocereus brasiliensis formed a clade with Strophocactus wittii and Pseudoacanthocereus sicariguensis (the only other species placed in Pseudoacanthocereus):

- - Neoraimondia herzogiana
  - - Pseudoacanthocereus brasiliensis
    - - Pseudoacanthocereus sicariguensis
      - Strophocactus wittii

Accordingly, both species of Pseudoacanthocereus were transferred to Strophocactus.

== Distribution and habitat ==
Strophocactus brasiliensis is native to Northeast and Southeast Brazil in the states of Bahia and Minas Gerais at elevations of 40–700 m (131–2,297 ft). It is found in the eastern Caatinga ecoregion, an area of thorn scrub and seasonally dry forests.
