= Deamia montalvoae =

Scientific classification
- Kingdom: Plantae
- Clade: Tracheophytes
- Clade: Angiosperms
- Clade: Eudicots
- Order: Caryophyllales
- Family: Cactaceae
- Subfamily: Cactoideae
- Genus: Deamia
- Species: D. montalvoae

Binomial name
- Deamia montalvoae Cerén, J.Menjívar & S.Arias

Species of flowering plant

Deamia montalvoae is a species of flowering plant in the family Cactaceae, native to southeastern Mexico, Guatemala and El Salvador. It was first described in 2018. It climbs or hangs from trees or rocks, and has large funnel-shaped flowers, mostly white, and pale red fruit, covered with bristles and hairs.

== Description ==
Deamia montalvoae either climbs or is partially supported by rocks or trees, with roots along its length which do not strongly cling to its supports. It branches freely and has numerous stems, up to 1.5 m (5 ft) long and 1–2 cm (0.4–0.8 in) across. The stems typically have 7–8 ribs, each 1–1.5 cm (0.4–0.6 in) high. The areoles have 7–13 spines, 0.4–2.6 cm (0.2–1.0 in) long, which are initially yellowish with a reddish apex and later darken. In addition to spines, the areoles have many bristles. The solitary flowers are funnel-shaped, 23–30 cm (9–12 in) long in total. The tepals are up to 10 cm (3.9 in) long, the outer ones being yellowish-brown, the inner ones white. The style is about 22 cm (8.7 in) long with its stigma ending either at the same place as the anthers of the stamens or up to 1 cm (0.4 in) beyond. The pale red fruits are up to 6 by 4.5 cm (2.4 by 1.8 in) and are fully covered with bristles and hairs. The white pulp of the fruit is fragrant and sweet.

== Taxonomy ==
Between 2008 and 2015, plants recorded as Deamia chontalensis, Selenicereus grandiflorus and Deamia aff. chontalensis were discovered in Guatemala, Mexico and El Salvador respectively. All three populations shared similar characteristics, but seemed to differ from known species in some respects, such as having much longer flowers than expected for D. chontalensis. In 2018, a study was published which used both molecular phylogenetic and morphological approaches to show that the plants were a new species of Deamia, which the authors of the study named Deamia montalvoae. The specific epithet honours Edy Albertina Montalvo, a pioneering El Salvadorian woman botanist.

== Distribution and habitat ==
Deamia montalvoae occurs in three known and isolated populations: Chiapas in the Sierra Madre del Sur mountains in Mexico, Huehuetenango in Guatemala, and Santa Ana in El Salvador. It inhabits tropical deciduous forests and cloud forests, and is particularly found on cliffs and around rivers at elevations of 600–1,200 m (2,000–3,900 ft). It climbs on various kinds of tree, including Sideroxylon tepicense and Ficus species.

== Conservation ==
Although the species had not been assessed by the IUCN as of March 2021, its occurrence in three isolated populations in an area smaller than 5,000 km^{2} (1,900 mi^{2}) led the original describers of the species to describe it as "endangered".
