= Deamia funis =

Conservation status
- Not evaluated (IUCN 3.1)

Scientific classification
- Kingdom: Plantae
- Clade: Tracheophytes
- Clade: Angiosperms
- Clade: Eudicots
- Order: Caryophyllales
- Family: Cactaceae
- Subfamily: Cactoideae
- Genus: Deamia
- Species: D. funis

Binomial name
- Deamia funis Hammel & S.Arias, 2022

Species of plant

Deamia funis is a species of succulent flowering plant in the genus Deamia, within the family Cactaceae. It is endemic to the eastern slope of Nicaragua's central highlands.

== Description ==
Deamia funis is a species of epiphytic cactus with a pendant, climbing, or creeping habit. The stems can grow to 10 m long, with diameters of 0.6-1.1 cm. They are articulated, cylindrical, and made up of more-or-less straight segments. The epidermis is green, and is often covered by a hard, brittle, transparent cuticle. They branch irregularly and usually grow adventitious roots at their bases; these allow them to attach themselves to tree trunks and branches.

This species has 6-8 narrow, relatively-rounded ribs on which the areoles are situated 1-1.5 cm apart. On the areoles, there are 4-18 straight, orange to black spines that are approximately 1.5 cm long. Trichomes are often absent; however, small numbers will occasionally persist. The leaves are scale-like and deltate, and measure 0.4 mm long; they fall off prematurely.

The flowers are solitary, very fragrant, and funnel-shaped. They are actinomorphic, appear at the ends of the stems, and open at night. They grow to 8-10 cm long and are white in color. The pericarpel is covered in spines and trichomes, and the perianth has many slightly-differentiated tepals, which are 1.5-2 cm long. The outer tepals are light yellow to white (and sometimes light brown at the apices), and the inner tepals are white. The stamens are 1.5-3 cm long. The stigma is located above the stamens due to the length (6-8 cm) of the style. This species usually flowers in the dry season, from January to April.

The fruits are ovoid and yellow-green when partially mature. Their skin is smooth, with approximately 20 spines up to 0.7 cm long; these do not completely cover the surface of the fruit.

== Distribution and habitat ==
This species is native to the eastern slope of Nicaragua's central highlands. It is found in cloud forests and seasonally-dry forests from 322 to 423 meters above sea level.

== Taxonomy ==
Deamia funis was described by Barry Edward Hammel and Ángel Salvador Arias Montes, and was first published in the scientific journal Phytotaxa 576: 221 in 2022.

Etymology

- Deamia: the genus name honors the American botanist and plant collector Charles C. Deam (1865–1953), who first sent the plant that would become known as Deamia testudo from Guatemala to the botanists Nathaniel Lord Britton and Joseph Nelson Rose to be studied.
- funis: the Latin specific epithet means "cord" or "rope", referring to the rope-like appearance of the long, pendant stems when this species grows on horizontal tree branches.

== Conservation status ==
The known range of this species is suffering from habitat destruction due to agricultural expansion. For this reason, according to the guidelines for use of the categories and criteria of the IUCN Red List (2022), Deamia funis should be considered Endangered.

== Cultivation ==
Deamia funis is rare in cultivation. It can be propagated vegetatively via cuttings.
