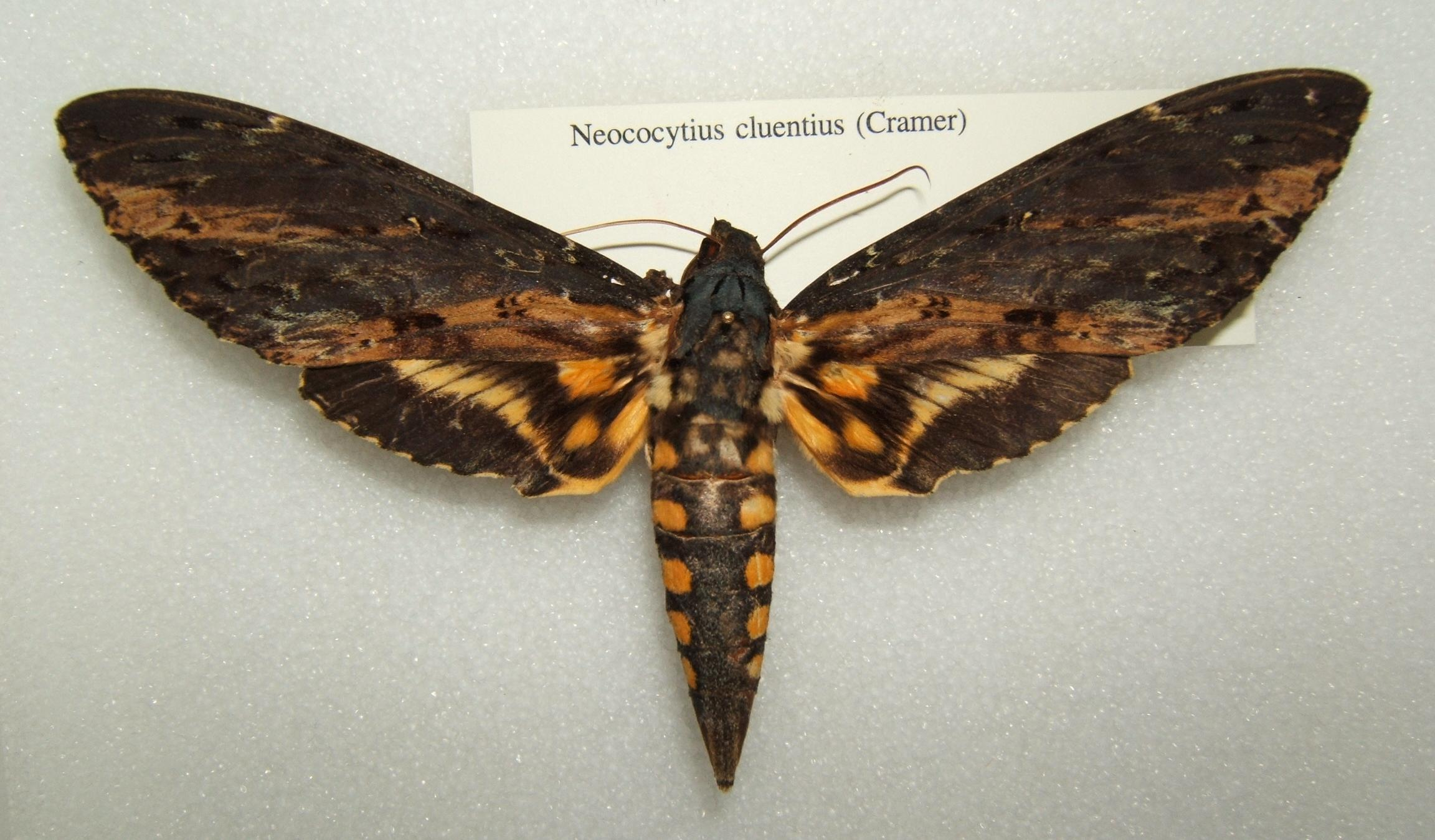

Scientific classification
- Kingdom: Animalia
- Phylum: Arthropoda
- Clade: Pancrustacea
- Class: Insecta
- Order: Lepidoptera
- Family: Sphingidae
- Tribe: Sphingini
- Genus: Neococytius; Hodges, 1971
- Species: N. cluentius

Binomial name
- Neococytius cluentius (Cramer, 1775)

Synonyms
- Sphinx cluentius Cramer, 1775; Cocytius cluentius (Cramer, 1775)

= Neococytius =

Cluentius sphinx

Genus of moths

Neococytius is a monotypic moth genus in the family Sphingidae erected by Ronald W. Hodges in 1971. Its only species, Neococytius cluentius, the Cluentius sphinx, was first described by Pieter Cramer in 1775 as Sphinx cluentius. It is found in northern South America, Central America, Mexico and the Caribbean. It is rare on Cuba. It has been recorded in North America, from Mississippi north to Michigan and Illinois.

The wingspan is 140–160 mm. There are at least three generations in the tropics, with adults on wing from December to January, May to June (or July in Jamaica) and October.

The larvae have been recorded on Annonaceae and Piperaceae species as well as Ipomoea batatas.

Otto Porsch in 1939 discussed the potential role of the species (under the synonym Cocytius cluentius) in pollinating cacti, giving the length of its tongue as 25 cm, and noting the corresponding lengths of the flowers of night-blooming cacti. A discussion of the possible pollinators of the cactus Strophocactus wittii in 1997 used the species name Cocytius "cruentus"; however, it cited a source that uses the correct specific name cluentius.
