= Peniocereus striatus =

Conservation status
- Least Concern (IUCN 3.1)

Scientific classification
- Kingdom: Plantae
- Clade: Tracheophytes
- Clade: Angiosperms
- Clade: Eudicots
- Order: Caryophyllales
- Family: Cactaceae
- Subfamily: Cactoideae
- Genus: Peniocereus
- Species: P. striatus

Binomial name
- Peniocereus striatus (Brandegee) Buxb.

Synonyms
- Cereus diguetii Cereus striatus Neoevansia striata Peniocereus diguetii Wilcoxia diguetii Wilcoxia striata

Species of cactus

Peniocereus striatus is a species of cactus known by several common names, including gearstem cactus, cardoncillo, jacamatraca, sacamatraca, and dahlia-rooted cactus. It is endemic to the Sonoran Desert, where it occurs in Baja California, Sinaloa, and Sonora in Mexico and Arizona in the United States.

This cactus is a shrub with narrow brown or greenish cylindrical branching stems up to a meter long, but known to reach 2 meters at times. When not in flower or fruit the plant is "very inconspicuous", and "commonly looking more like a collection of dead stems" hidden amongst the dry branches of other plants. The stems are covered in clusters of small, weak spines a few millimeters long. They are yellowish white, sometimes with black tips. The roots have tuber-like swellings at their tips that resemble sweet potatoes. The flowers bloom at night. They are up to 10 centimeters wide with white or pinkish inner tepals and reddish or purplish outer tepals. The style is up to 6 centimeters long and the stamens are about one centimeter in length. The bright red, spiny fruit is 4 or 5 centimeters long. Flowering and fruiting usually occur when summer rainfall starts.

This cactus grows in sandy desert soils on hills and flats. It usually grows beneath other plants. It is associated with nurse plants, including ironwood (Olneya tesota) and creosote bush (Larrea tridentata). The flowers are pollinated by sphinx moths. The seeds are eaten by birds, which then disperse them; many of the cacti grow beneath the trees where birds roost.

Some populations of this cactus are threatened and in decline. In general, the plant is common in its range and is not a threatened species.
