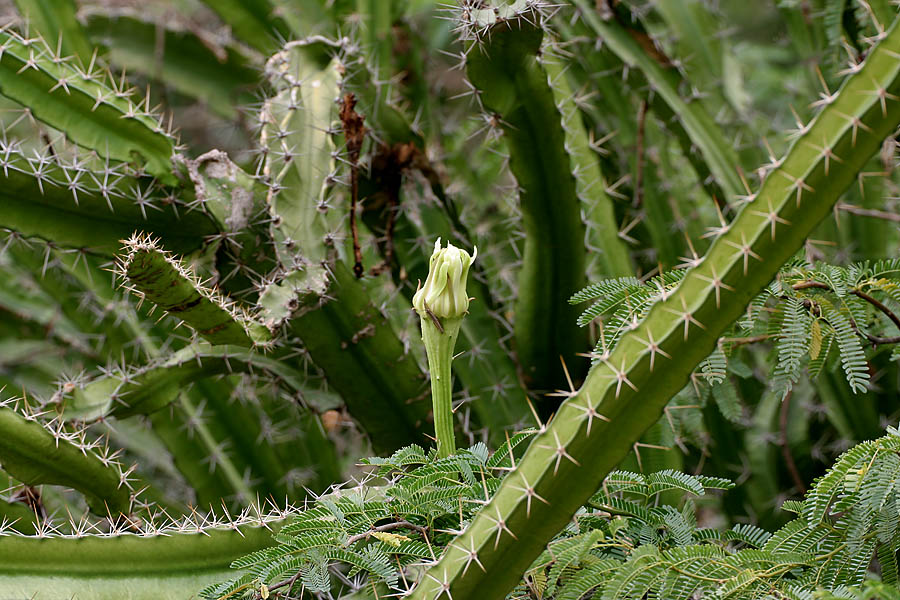

Conservation status
- Least Concern (IUCN 3.1)

Scientific classification
- Kingdom: Plantae
- Clade: Tracheophytes
- Clade: Angiosperms
- Clade: Eudicots
- Order: Caryophyllales
- Family: Cactaceae
- Subfamily: Cactoideae
- Genus: Acanthocereus
- Species: A. tetragonus

Binomial name
- Acanthocereus tetragonus (L.) Hummelinck

Synonyms
- Acanthocereus pentagonus (L.) Britton & Rose; Acanthocereus pitajaya Croizat; Cactus pentagonus L. Cactus tetragonus L. Cereus pentagonus (L.) Haw.

= Acanthocereus tetragonus =

Species of plant

Acanthocereus tetragonus is a species of cactus that is native to Florida and the Lower Rio Grande Valley of Texas in the United States, Mexico, Central America, the Caribbean, and northern South America. The species is invasive in New Caledonia. Common names include night-blooming cereus, barbed-wire cactus, sword-pear, dildo cactus, triangle cactus, and Órgano-alado de pitaya (Spanish). The miniature cultivar is known as fairy castle cactus. It was originally described by Carl Linnaeus in 1753 as Cactus tetragonus but was moved to the genus Acanthocereus in 1938 by Pieter Wagenaar Hummelinck.

== Description ==
Acanthocereus tetragonus is a tall, columnar cactus that reaches a height of 2–7 m (6.6–23.0 ft). Stems are dark green, have three to five angles, and are 6–8 cm (2.4–3.1 in) in diameter. Areoles are grey and separated by 2–3 cm (0.79–1.18 in). Central areoles have one to two spines up to 4 cm (1.6 in) long, while radial areoles have six to eight spines up to 2.5 cm (0.98 in) in length. The flowers are 14–20 cm (5.5–7.9 in) in diameter with a tube 8–15 cm (3.1–5.9 in) in length. Outer tepals are greenish-white, inner tepals are pure white, and pistils are creamy white. Flowers are open from midnight until dawn, attracting hummingbird moths (Hemaris spp.). The shiny, red fruits are around 5 cm (2.0 in) long.

This highly spiny, often large, and thicket-forming cactus has stems up to 10 feet or possibly taller. It is native to the coastal hammocks and hot, dry coastal habitats and thickets and sandy coastal habitats of central and southern Florida and the Keys, south into the Caribbean. The flowers are showy and are white with a deep red and orange or red-orange center. The flowers bloom at night and close during the day. This cactus blooms a few times a year for several weeks at a time. This cactus often forms thickets in coastal hammocks which can be impenetrable and spiny.

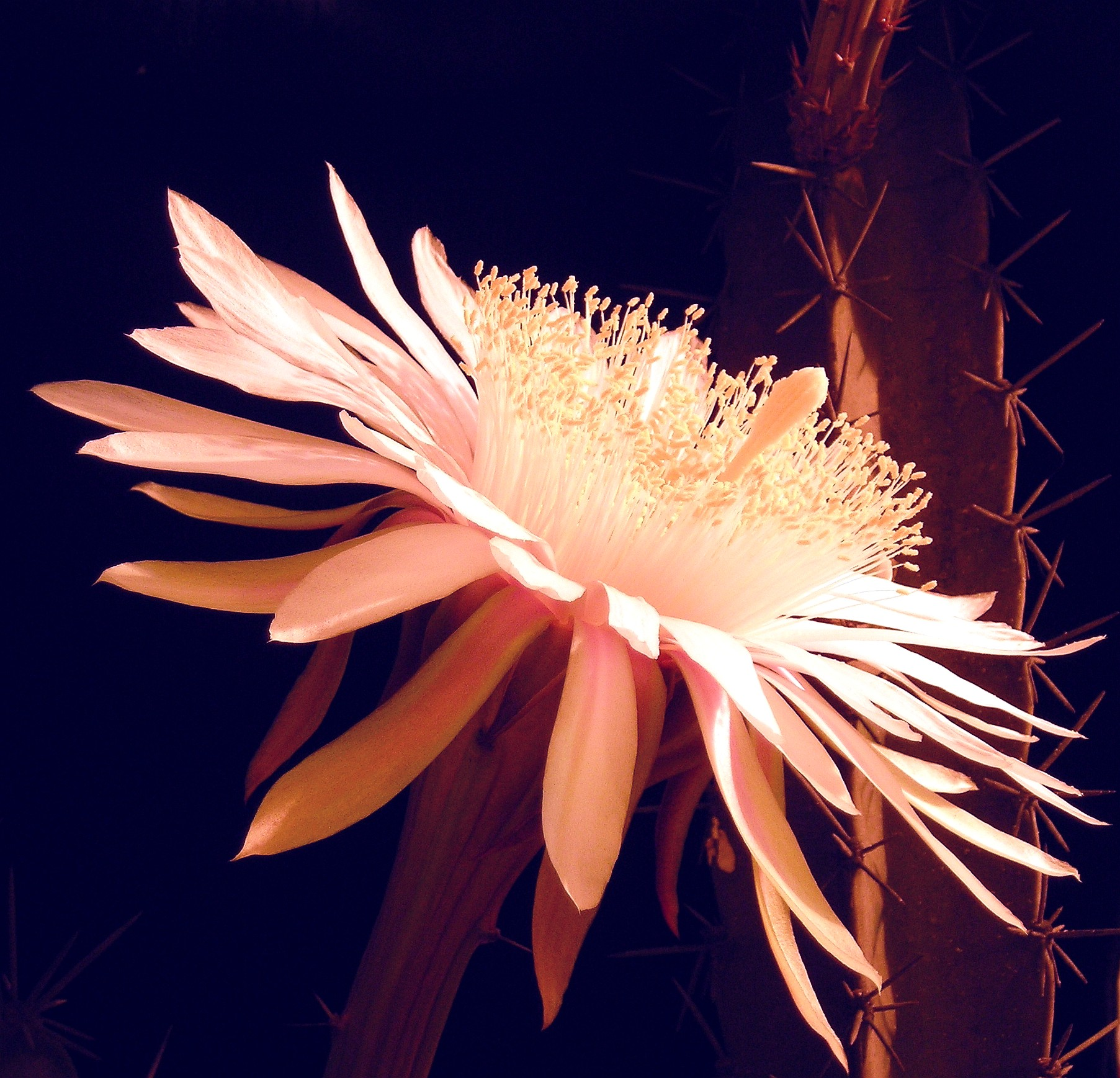
Open bloom

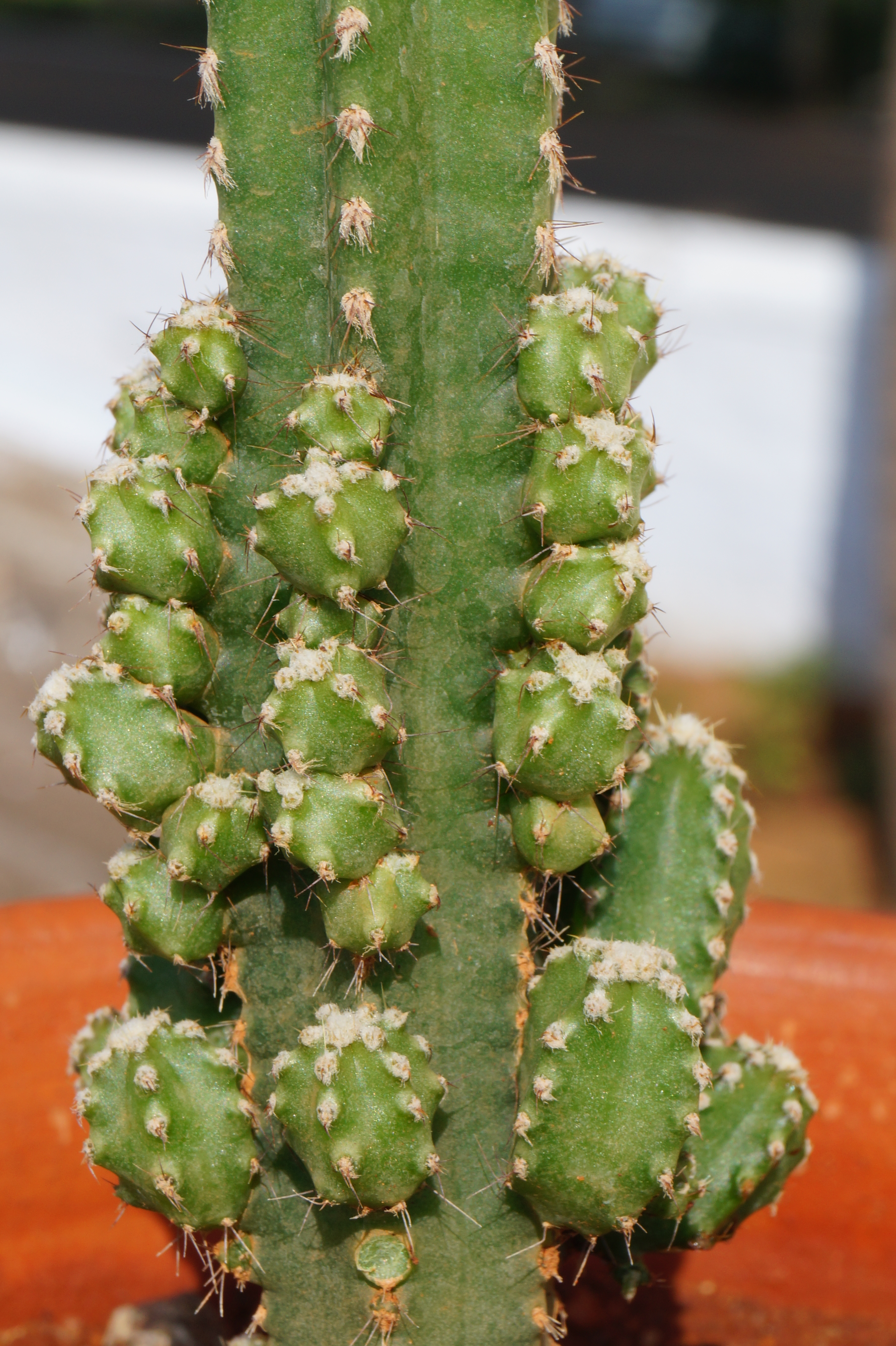
Fairy castles buds

== Cultivars ==
The fairy castle cactus or fairytale castle cactus is a miniature cultivar of this species. It has many curved branches that resemble the turrets of a castle.

== Uses ==
Young stems of the barbed-wire cactus can be eaten as a vegetable either cooked or raw, while the fruits are edible and sweet. It is sometimes cultivated as an ornamental outdoors. It is sometimes planted as a living fence.

The miniature cultivar of this species, fairy castle cactus, is commonly grown as a houseplant for its small size and interesting shape.
