= Cactus fence =

Fence made of cactus plants

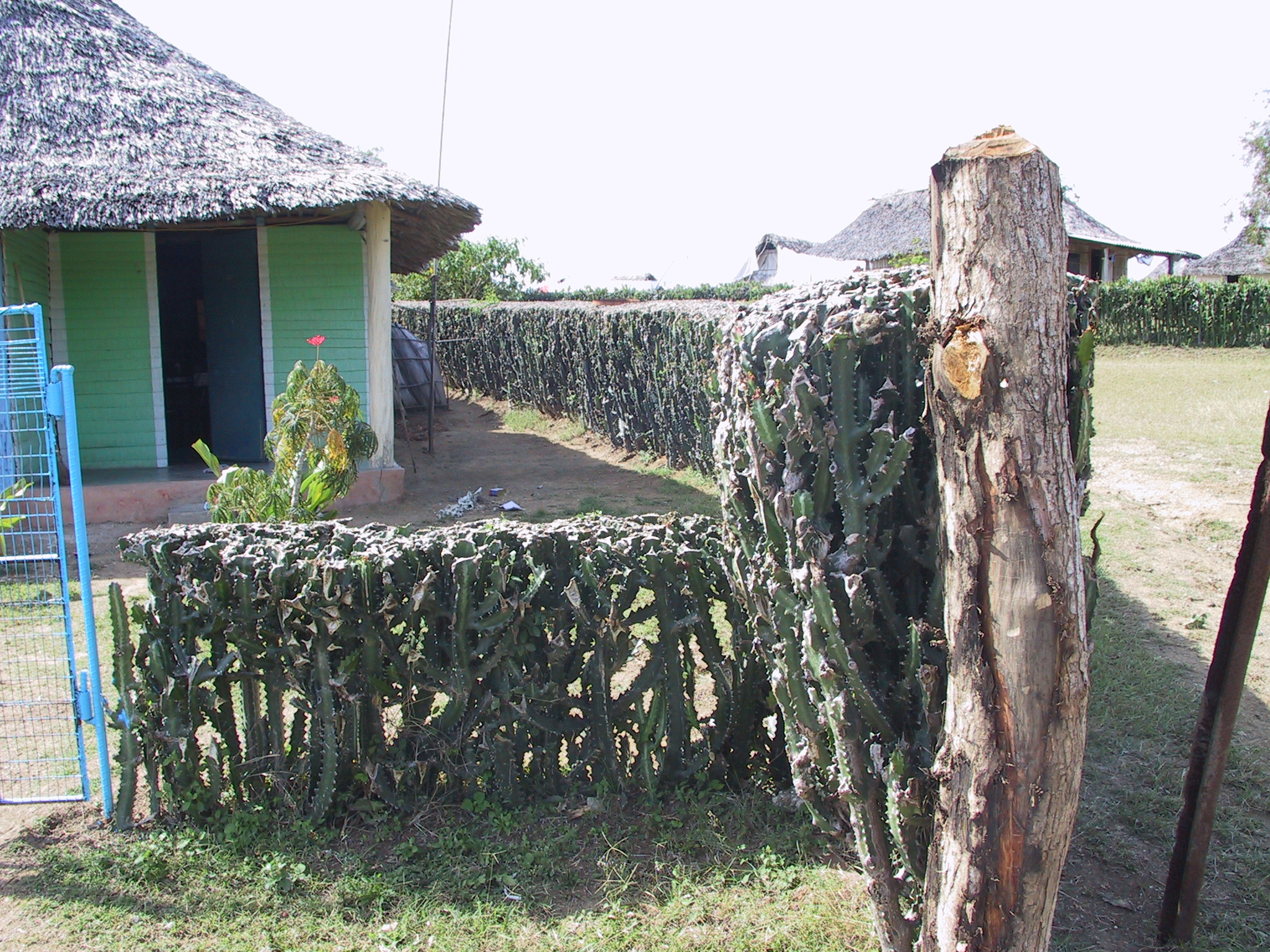
Acanthocereus tetragonus, laid out as a "living fence", rural area, Cuba

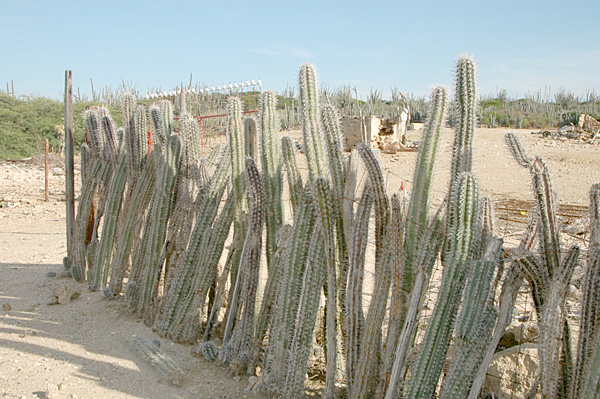
A cactus fence in Bonaire.

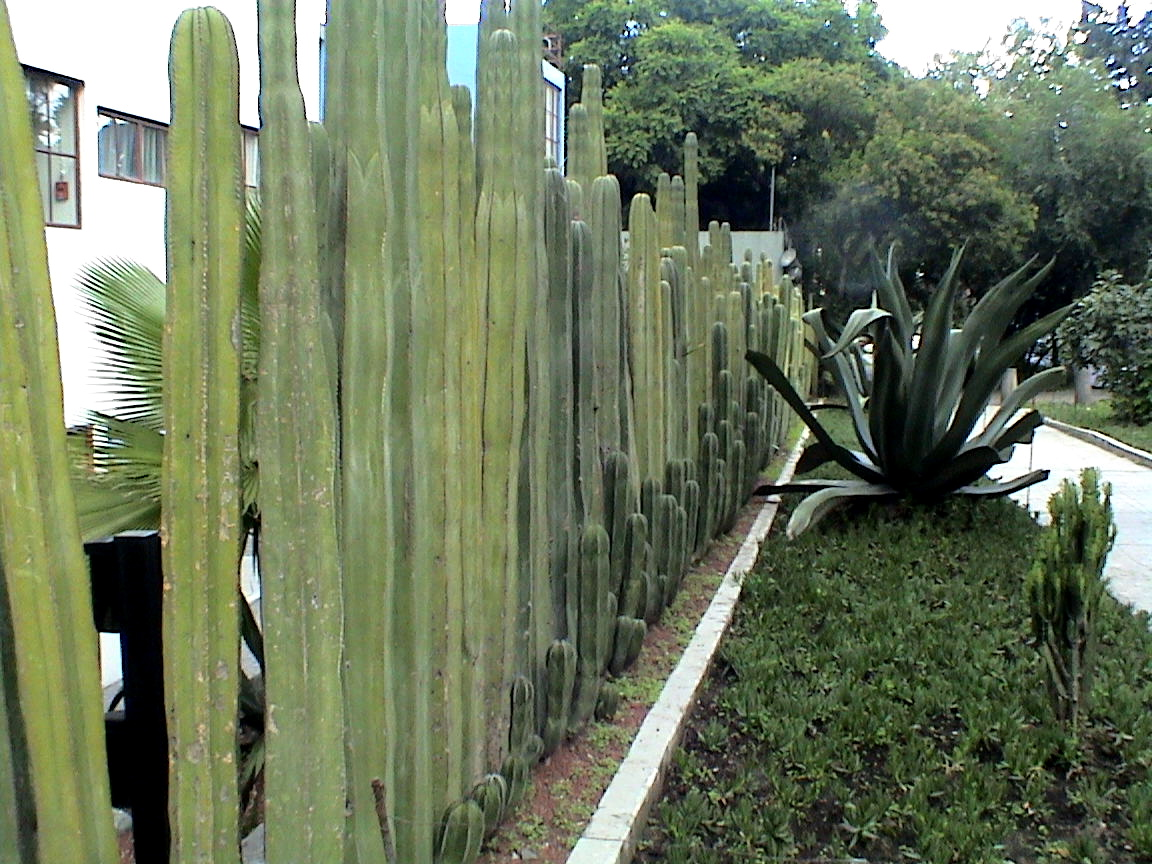
A cactus fence in Mexico.

A cactus fence is a hedge or fence made of closely spaced cactus plants, sometimes with barbed wire or wood interwoven with the cacti.

== Purpose ==
Such fences are inexpensive to develop in regions where cacti are common, and can provide an extreme deterrent to any but a determined human intruder. Often their primary function is to keep wandering large animals off a private property.

== Design ==
Sometimes, cacti are used as barriers without being formed into a structured fence. Prickly pears (mostly Opuntia stricta) were imported into Australia in the 19th century for use as a natural agricultural fence and to establish a cochineal dye industry, but quickly became a widespread weed.

Closely spaced columnar cacti such as Trichocereus or Mexican fencepost cactus can be used for more structured, space-saving fences.

In the American southwest, ocotillo stems are often set in the ground to form a structure similar to a cactus fence.
