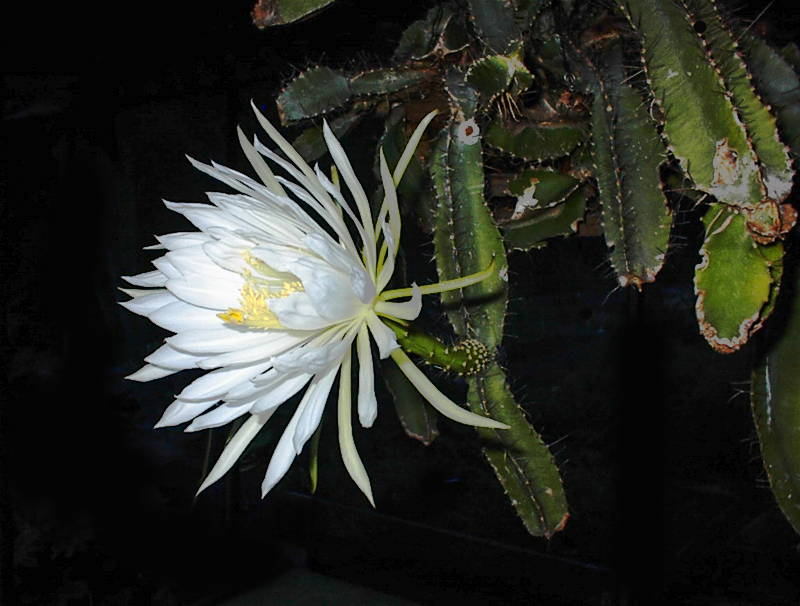

Scientific classification
- Kingdom: Plantae
- Clade: Tracheophytes
- Clade: Angiosperms
- Clade: Eudicots
- Order: Caryophyllales
- Family: Cactaceae
- Subfamily: Cactoideae
- Genus: Deamia
- Species: D. testudo

Binomial name
- Deamia testudo (Karw. ex Zucc.) Britton & Rose

Synonyms
- Cereus miravallensis F.A.C.Weber; Cereus testudo Karw. ex Zucc.; Deamia diabolica Clover; Selenicereus miravallensis (F.A.C.Weber) Britton & Rose; Selenicereus testudo (Karw. ex Zucc.) Buxb.; Strophocactus testudo (Karw. ex Zucc.) Ralf Bauer

= Deamia testudo =

Species of flowering plant

Deamia testudo is a species of flowering plant in the family Cactaceae, native from southern Mexico through Central America to Nicaragua. It was first described in 1838. It is a climber or clamberer, with long stems and large white flowers.

== Description ==
Deamia testudo clambers over or hangs from rocks, or climbs or hangs from trees. It produces roots along its stems by which it clings tightly to its support. The stems are made up of segments up to 25 cm (10 in) long and 8 cm (3 in) in diameter. The stems usually have three ribs, although there may be up to eight. The ribs are thin and wing-like, about 1–3 cm (0.4–1.2 in) high. The areoles have up to 10 or more brownish spines, each 1–2 cm (0.4–0.8 in) long. The flowers have a long thin base and widely spread white tepals. Altogether the flower is about 25 cm (10 in) long and 15 cm (6 in) across. The fruits of the cactus, which are red in color, are covered in spines.

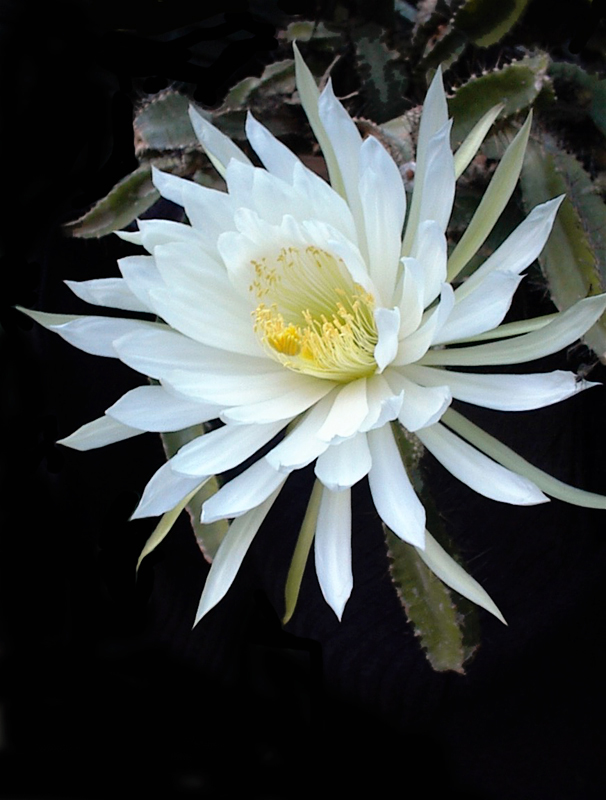
Flower

== Taxonomy ==
The species was first described by Joseph Gerhard Zuccarini in 1838, as Cereus testudo. Zuccarini ascribed the scientific name to Wilhelm Friedrich Karwinsky. In 1920, Nathaniel Lord Britton and Joseph Nelson Rose considered the species sufficiently distinctive to transfer it to their newly created genus Deamia, where it was the only species. In 1965, Franz Buxbaum transferred it to the genus Selenicereus, based on its flowers, a view supported by Wilhelm Barthlott and David Hunt in 1993. In 2003, Ralf Bauer transferred it to the genus Strophocactus. Meanwhile, in 2002, Alexander Doweld had revived Deamia for both this species and another formerly placed in Selenicereus (Deamia chontalensis). Molecular phylogenetic studies in 2017 and in 2018 confirmed the monophyly of the genus Deamia, of which D. testudo is the type species.

== Distribution ==
Deamia testudo is native from southern Mexico (southeastern, southwestern and Veracruz on the Gulf), through Guatemala, Belize and Honduras to Nicaragua.
