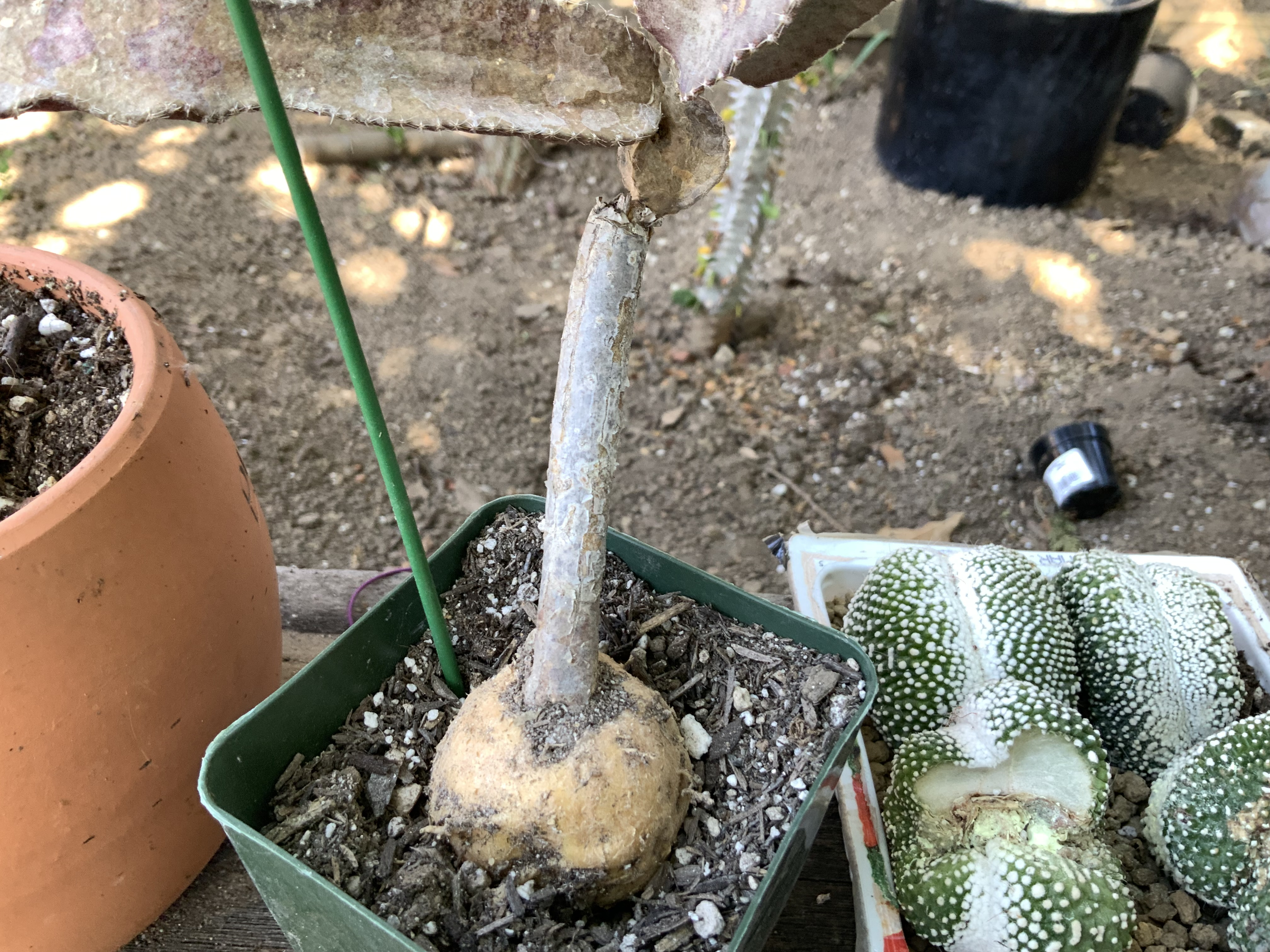
- A caudex of Acanthocereus tepalcatepecanus

Scientific classification
- Kingdom: Plantae
- Clade: Tracheophytes
- Clade: Angiosperms
- Clade: Eudicots
- Order: Caryophyllales
- Family: Cactaceae
- Subfamily: Cactoideae
- Genus: Acanthocereus
- Species: A. tepalcatepecanus

Binomial name
- Acanthocereus tepalcatepecanus (Sánchez-Mej.) Lodé 2013

= Acanthocereus tepalcatepecanus =

Species of cactus

Acanthocereus tepalcatepecanus is a species of crawling cactus native to the Mexican states of Jalisco, Michoacán, and Guerrero.

== Description ==
Acanthocereus tepalcatepecanus is a species of caudex-forming cactus native to the dry areas in Mexico. The stem are a purplish-grey, about 1in wide. Like other species of acanthocereus, this species has showy flowers and reddish fruit.Fruits are globose to tubular. Fruits are edible.
