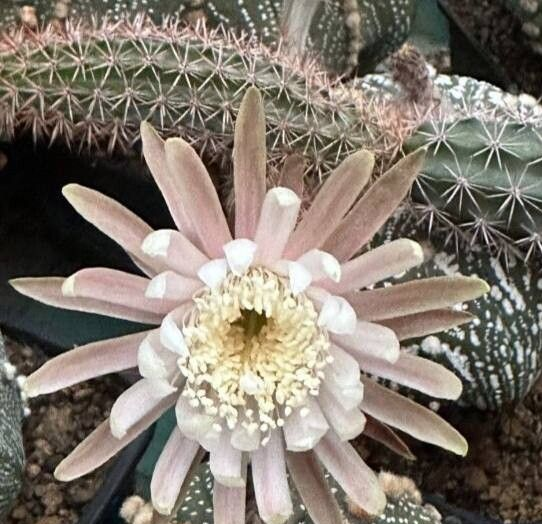

Conservation status
- Vulnerable (IUCN 3.1)

Scientific classification
- Kingdom: Plantae
- Clade: Tracheophytes
- Clade: Angiosperms
- Clade: Eudicots
- Order: Caryophyllales
- Family: Cactaceae
- Subfamily: Cactoideae
- Genus: Acanthocereus
- Species: A. oaxacensis

Binomial name
- Acanthocereus oaxacensis (Britton & Rose) Lodé

Synonyms
- Nyctocereus oaxacensis Britton & Rose (basionym); Peniocereus oaxacensis D.R.Hunt

= Acanthocereus oaxacensis =

Species of cactus

Acanthocereus oaxacensis is a species of succulent flowering plant in the genus Acanthocereus, within the family Cactaceae. It is endemic to southwestern Mexico.

== Description ==
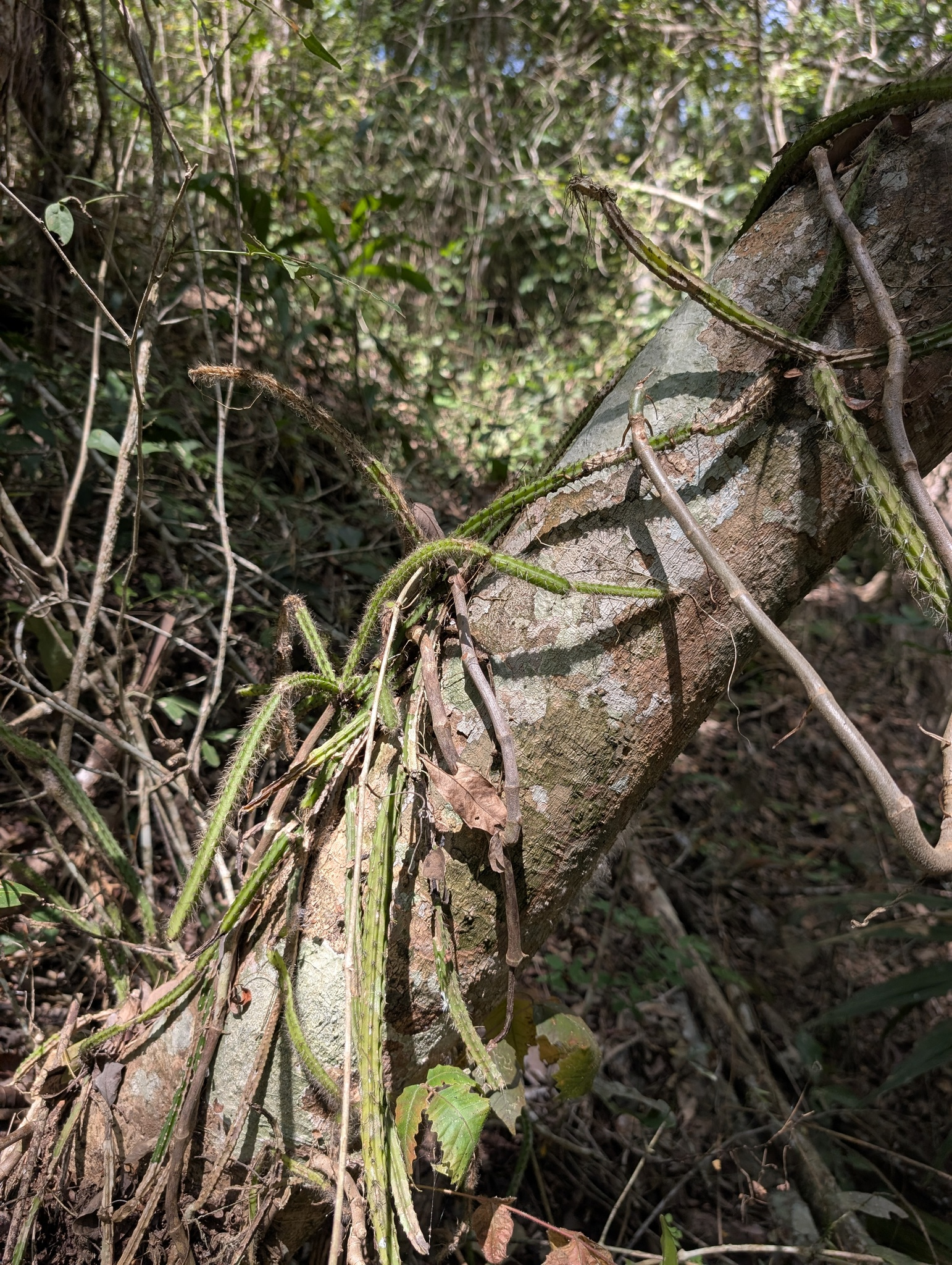
In habitat in the state of Oaxaca, Mexico

Acanthocereus oaxacensis is a species of small climbing or creeping cactus. It has fleshy tuberous roots. The stems are branches, and may grow up to 50 cm in length.

This species has 7-11 ribs. Its 3-5 (or occasionally up to 6) central spines are brown in color. There are 8-12 (occasionally up to 14) marginal spines, which are brown in color and measure 4-15 mm in length.

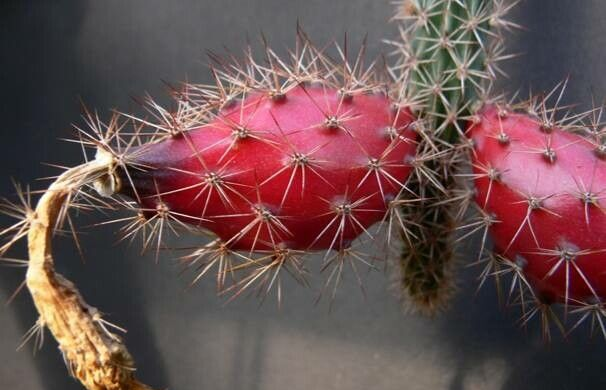
Fruit

The flowers are white in color and open at night. They measure 8-10 cm in length, and the pericarpel is covered in dense brown bristles. The fruits are elongated and purple to magenta in color, with a diameter of approximately 4 cm.

== Distribution and habitat ==
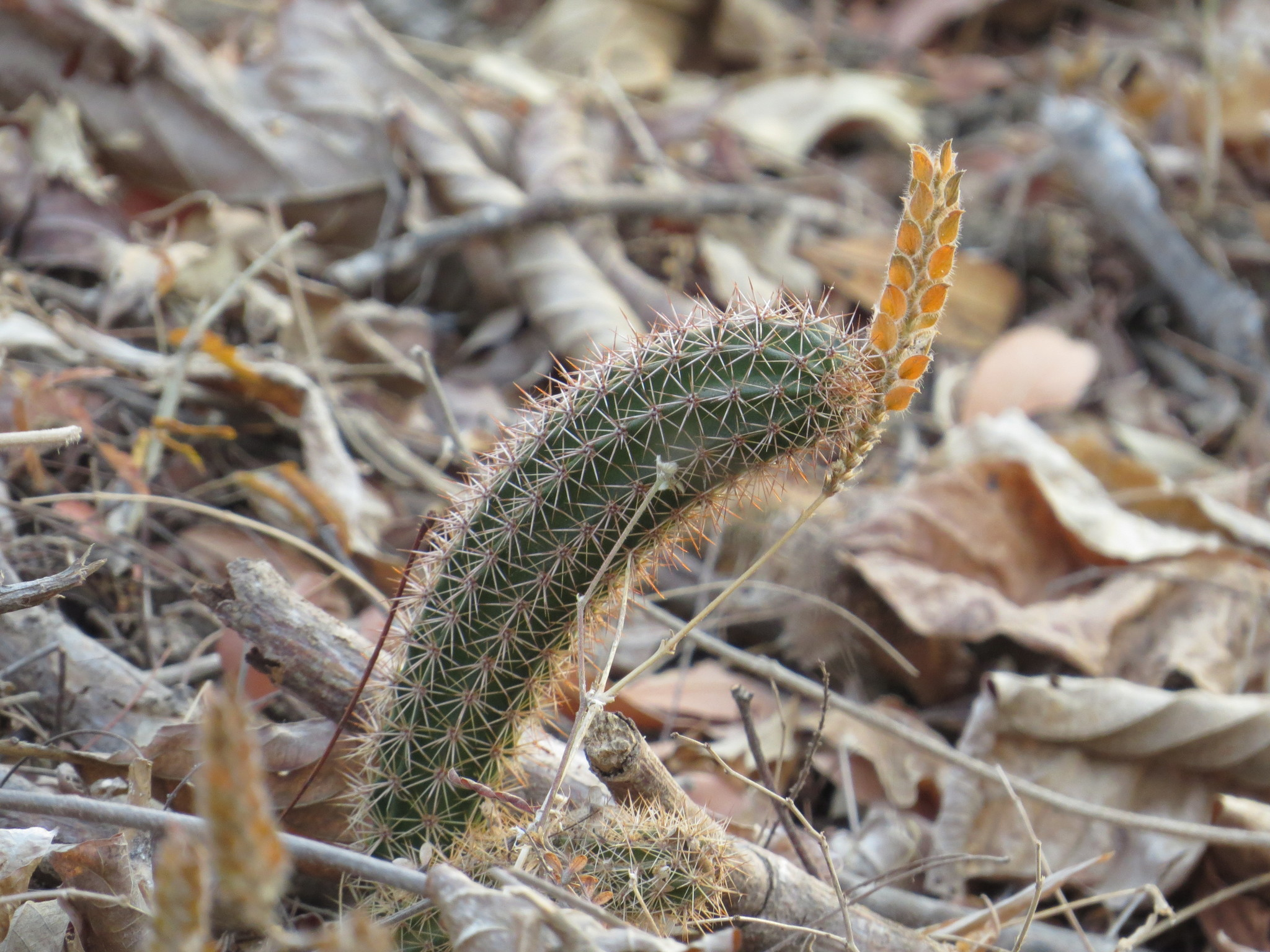
Stem

Acanthocereus oaxacensis is native to the state of Oaxaca in Mexico, where it grows mainly in the seasonally-dry tropical biome.

== Taxonomy ==
Acanthocereus oaxacensis was first described as Nyctocereus oaxacensis, a name published in 1920 by the American botanists Nathaniel Lord Britton and Joseph Nelson Rose in their book The Cactaceae; descriptions and illustrations of plants of the cactus family 2: 120.

Later, the French botanist Joël Lodé transferred this species to the genus Acanthocereus, renaming it Acanthocereus oaxacensis. He registered these changes in the scientific journal Cactus-Aventures International 97: 2, published in 2013.

Etymology

- Acanthocereus: the genus name is derived from the Greek word akantha (meaning "spine") and the Latin word cereus (meaning "candle"), in reference to this genus' spininess.
- oaxacensis: the specific epithet refers to the Mexican state of Oaxaca, to which this species is endemic.

== Conservation status ==
On the IUCN Red List, Acanthocereus oaxacensis is classified as being Vulnerable (VU).

== Cultivation ==
Acanthocereus oaxacensis is primarily cultivated as an ornamental. It may be propagated vegetatively via cuttings, or via seed.
