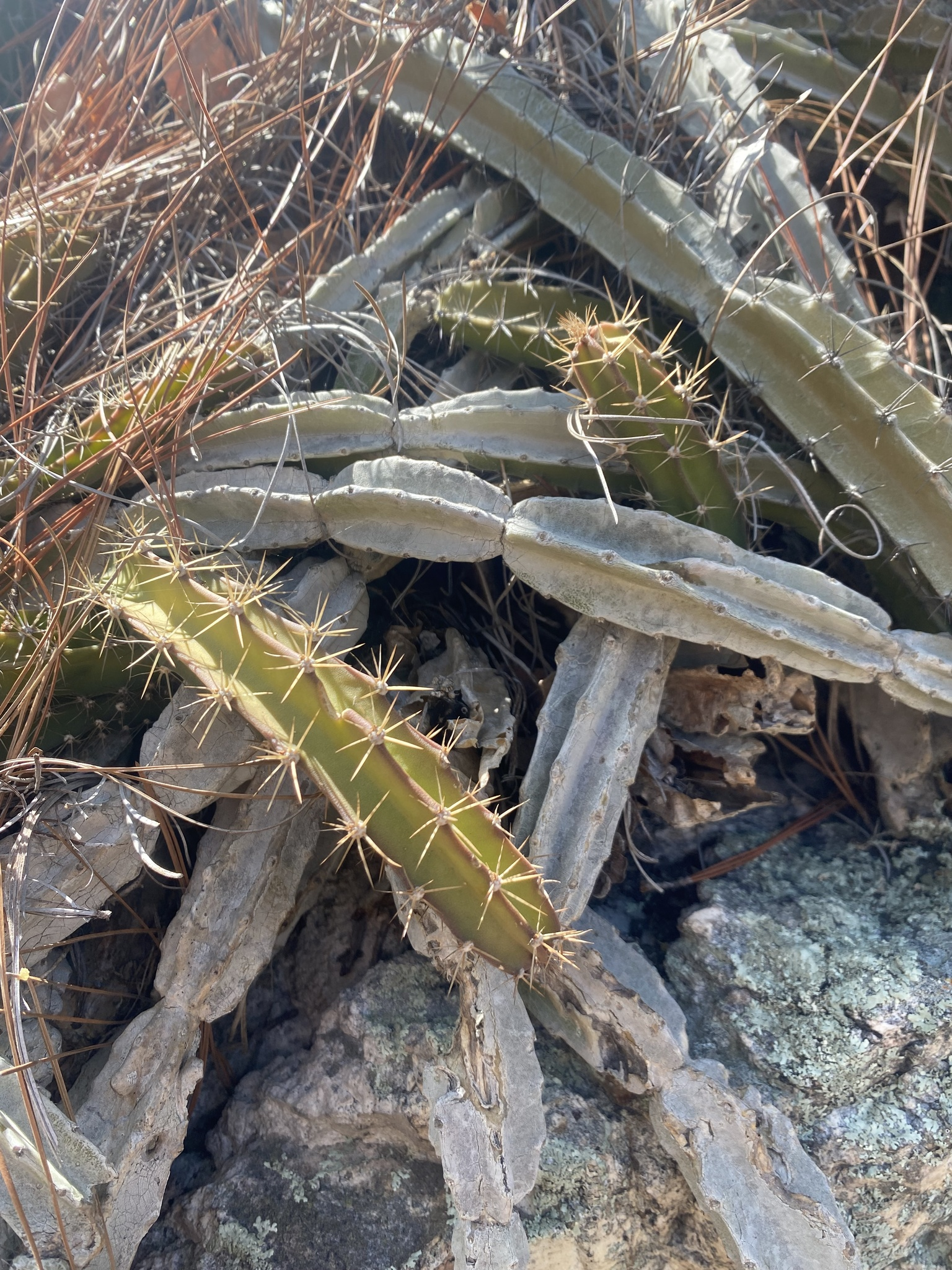

Scientific classification
- Kingdom: Plantae
- Clade: Tracheophytes
- Clade: Angiosperms
- Clade: Eudicots
- Order: Caryophyllales
- Family: Cactaceae
- Subfamily: Cactoideae
- Genus: Deamia
- Species: D. chontalensis

Binomial name
- Deamia chontalensis (Alexander) Doweld

Synonyms
- Nyctocereus chontalensis Alexander; Selenicereus chontalensis (Alexander) Kimnach; Strophocactus chontalensis (Alexander) Ralf Bauer

= Deamia chontalensis =

Species of flowering plant

Deamia chontalensis is a species of flowering plant in the family Cactaceae, native to southwestern Mexico and Guatemala. It has sprawling or pendent branched stems and fragrant white flowers.

== Description ==
Deamia chontalensis is either pendent or sprawling, typically growing up to 1 m (3 ft) or more long on rocky surfaces and rooting on the underside. The stems are made up of segments 10–40 cm (4–16 in) long and 4–5 cm (1.6–2.0 in) across. They branch at the nodes between the segments. The stems have 5–6 ribs with slightly sunken areoles bearing yellowish spines 5–10 mm (0.2–0.4 in) long. The very fragrant white flowers are funnel-shaped, 6–8 cm (2.4–3.1 in) long. They are followed by globe-shaped spiny red fruit with a diameter of 1–2 cm (0.4–0.8 in).

== Taxonomy ==
The species was first described by Edward Johnston Alexander in 1836, as Nyctocereus chontalensis. It was later placed in the genera Selenicereus and Strophocactus, but molecular phylogenetic studies in 2017 and 2018 showed that it belonged to a separate clade, and it was transferred to the revived genus Deamia. As of March 2021, this transfer had not been accepted by Plants of the World Online, which retained it in Selenicereus.

== Distribution and habitat ==
Deamia chontalensis is native to southwestern Mexico and Guatemala. In Oaxaca, Mexico, it is found in pine and oak forests.
