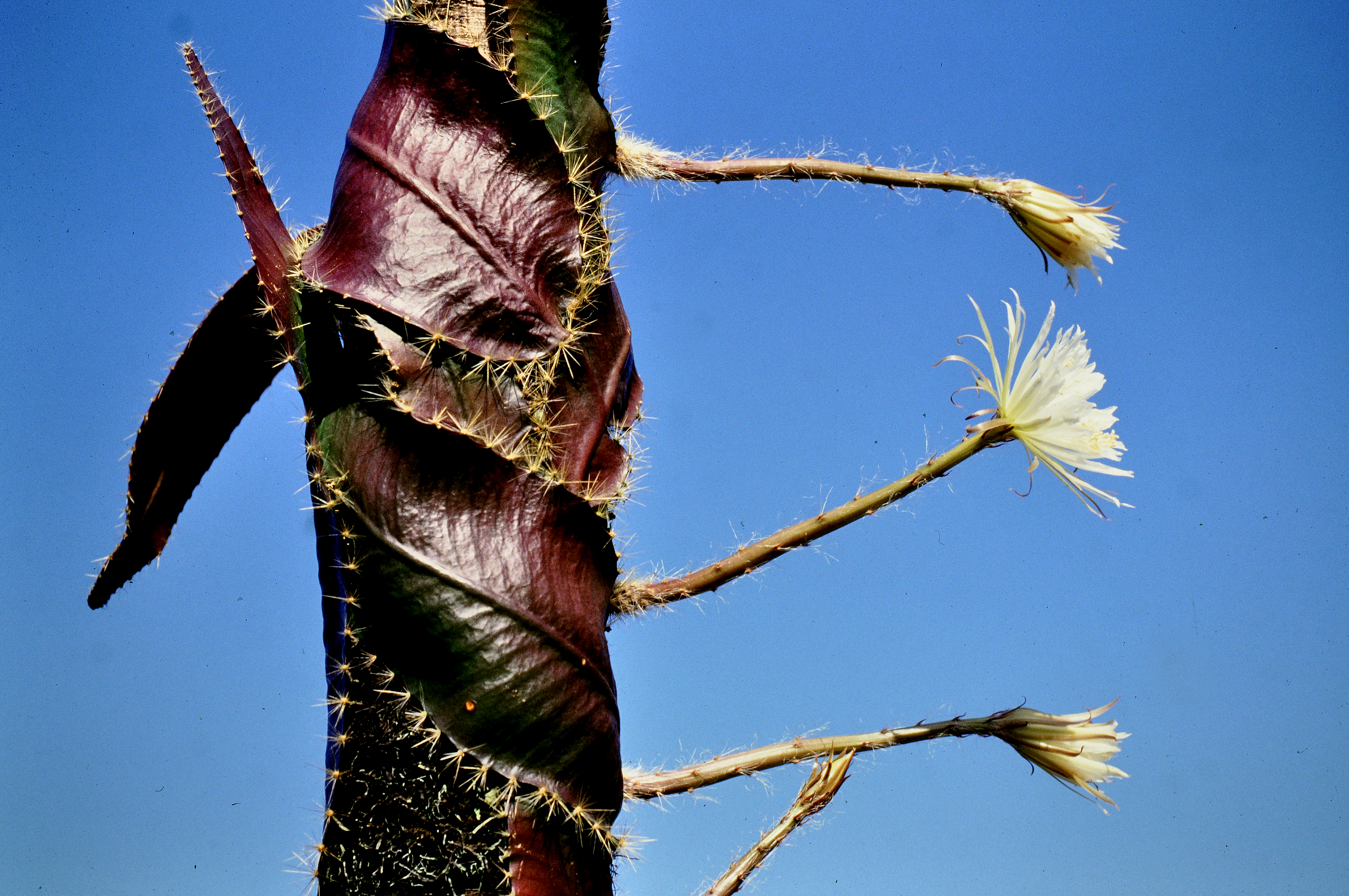
- Strophocactus wittii, Flowering plant climbing on a tree branch

Scientific classification
- Kingdom: Plantae
- Clade: Tracheophytes
- Clade: Angiosperms
- Clade: Eudicots
- Order: Caryophyllales
- Family: Cactaceae
- Subfamily: Cactoideae
- Genus: Strophocactus
- Species: S. wittii

Binomial name
- Strophocactus wittii (K.Schum.) Britton & Rose

Synonyms
- Cereus wittii K.Schum.; Selenicereus wittii (K.Schum.) G.D.Rowley

= Strophocactus wittii =

Amazon moonflower

Species of cactus

Strophocactus wittii, synonym Selenicereus wittii, known as the Amazon moonflower, is a species of plant in the genus Strophocactus in the cactus family (Cactaceae), and is one of several species commonly called "moonflowers". It was first described in 1900 by Karl Moritz Schumann and is one of three species of cactus found in the central Amazon basin.

The flat, ribbonlike, root climbing stem grows epiphytically on the trunks of trees in seasonally flooded forests of the Amazon basin, which is regularly flooded for a few weeks each year. During this time, the seeds spread through the water, which is unique within the cactus family.

== Description ==
=== Vegetative characteristics ===
Strophocactus wittii grows as an epiphyte, creeping and climbing up trees. The richly branched, leaf-like, flattened stems are phylloclades, and are pressed close to the tree trunks of their carriers and form aerial roots along their midrib. When exposed to direct sunlight, the elliptical to lanceolate, dark green shoots turn dull red due to strong betalain pigmentation and are therefore clearly visible from a distance. Each segment is up to 60 cm long and 6–14 cm wide, but only 2 to 4 mm thick. Their edges are slightly notched, and are covered with white woolly areoles about every 8–10 mm. Up to 20 needle-shaped, whitish spines up to 12 mm long arise from the areoles.

=== Flowers ===
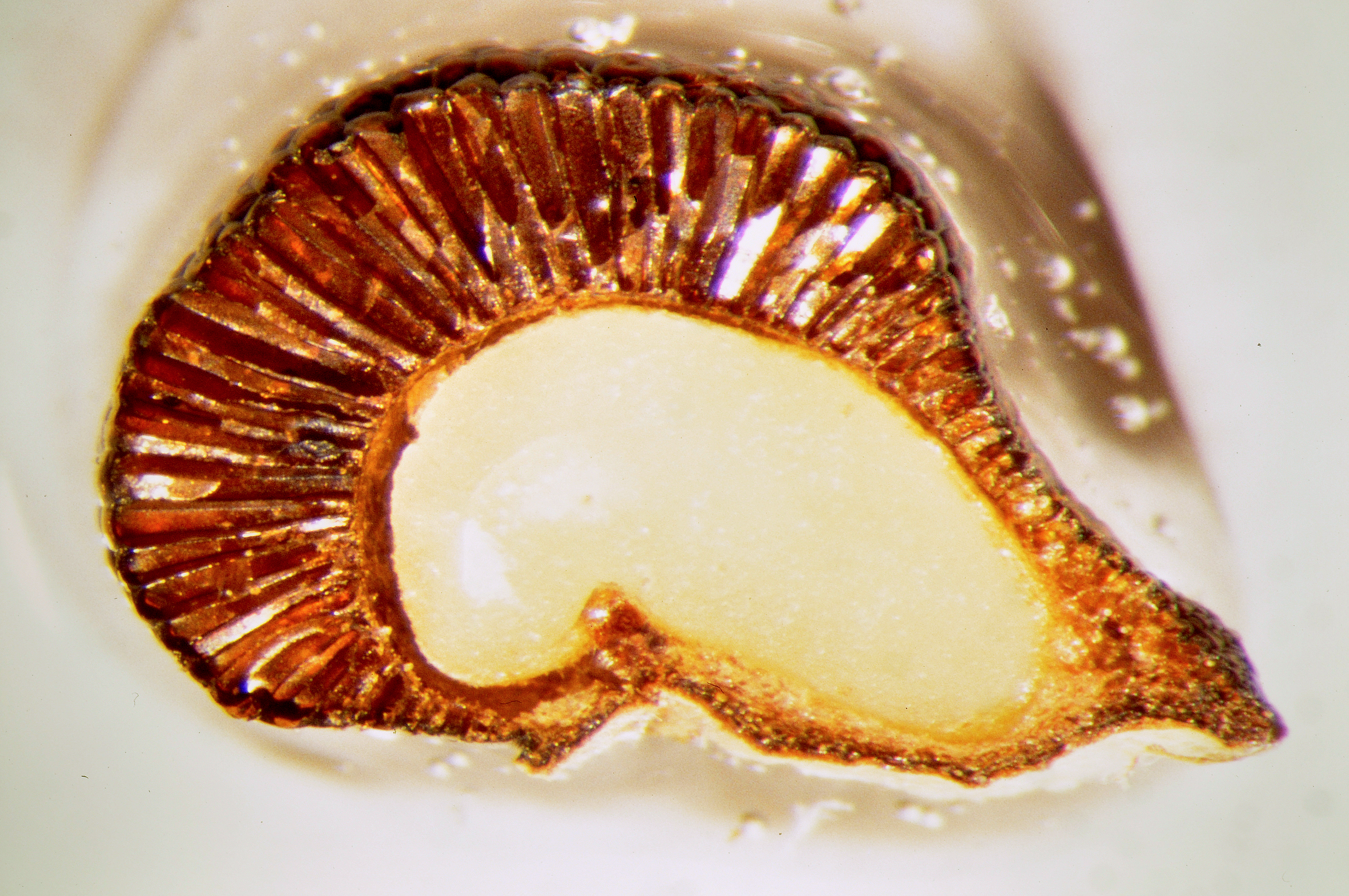
Seed of Strophocactus wittii in section. The whitish kindney-shaped embryo is covered by a brown seed coat with many air chambers for floating in the Amazonian flooded Igapó forests

The salver-shaped flowers are up to 27 cm long and reach a diameter of 12.5 cm. The long, slender flower tube measures just 9 mm in diameter. The tepals then spread out flat. They are pure white and intensely reflect ultraviolet light. The hypanthium and the flower tube are scaly and covered with hair-like spines. The nectaries at the base of the flower secrete a large amount of clear nectar. The stigma lobes and the lower portion of the style are warty (papillose). The pollen grains of Strophocactus wittii are hexacolpate, that is, they have six instead of three germ folds on the surface of the pollen grains.

In its natural location, Strophocactus wittii blooms in May. In greenhouse cultivation in Europe it flowers between November and February. The flowers only open for one night. The flower typically begins to open after sunset and is fully open within two hours, closing again at sunrise. Until the flowers are fully open, the flowers initially give off an intense fragrance, which eventually turns into an unpleasant odor. The components responsible for the odor have been identified as benzyl alcohol, benzyl benzoate and benzyl salicylate.

=== Fruits and seeds ===
The fruits are elongated, greenish and thorny berries, about 3.5 cm long. They mature in their natural location in about a year and then tear open along a longitudinal opening. The pulp contained in the fruit is rather dry. The shell-shaped, glossy black-brown seeds are about 4 mm long and 2 mm wide. This makes them unusually large for seeds of the cactus family. The hilum and the micropyle of the seeds are united. The seed coat is almost smooth. The main part of the seed consists of a layer of greatly enlarged, dead cells that are on the top and are filled with air, which allows the seeds to float in water.

== Taxonomy ==
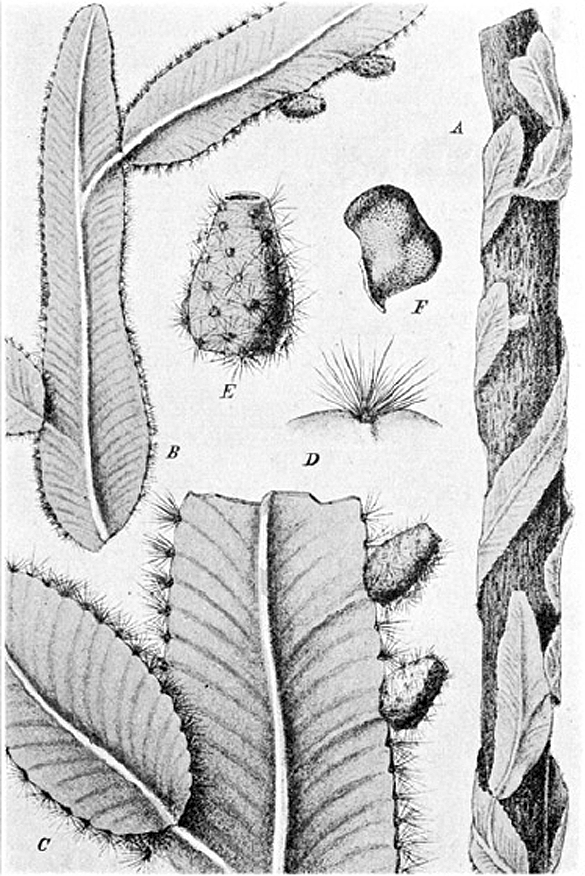
Panel from the first description from 1900 by Karl Moritz Schumann

Strophocactus wittii was discovered in 1899 in the Igapó forests of the Rio Negro near Manaus by the German businessman and hobby plant collector Nikolaus Heinrich Witt (from whom the second part of the scientific name is derived). He sent a plant to Karl Moritz Schumann in Berlin-Dahlem, who at first could not classify it taxonomically. Only when Schumann received further specimens from Witt in the autumn of 1900 and discovered fruit on them, was he able to assign them to the genus Cereus, and publish the first species description as Cereus wittii. With the choice of the specific epithet, Schumann honored the discoverer of the species. The botanical illustrator Margaret Mee (1909–1988) was able to observe and draw the species in its wild habitat. The main study of the biology, ecology and distribution of the species was made by Wilhelm Barthlott in 1997.

The systematic position of the species has been disputed. Nathaniel Lord Britton and Joseph Nelson Rose created the monotypical genus Strophocactus in 1913 with the only species Strophocactus wittii. They derived the botanical name of the genus from the Greek noun στροφή strophe for "wind, twist" because the shoots wound or twisted around the host plant. In 1986, Gordon Rowley transferred the species to the genus Selenicereus due to its flower structure. In 2003, Ralf Bauer suggested that Strophocactus should be recognized again and that Selenicereus wittii should be re-classified in this genus.

=== Phylogeny ===
A molecular phylogenetic study of the Hylocereeae in 2017 showed that the widely circumscribed genus Selenicereus was not monophyletic, and neither was Strophocactus:

- - Clade including Selenicereus wittii = Strophocactus wittii
  - - Clade including Strophocactus chontalensis and Strophocactus testudo
    - Re-circumscribed tribe Hylocereeae, including Selenicereus

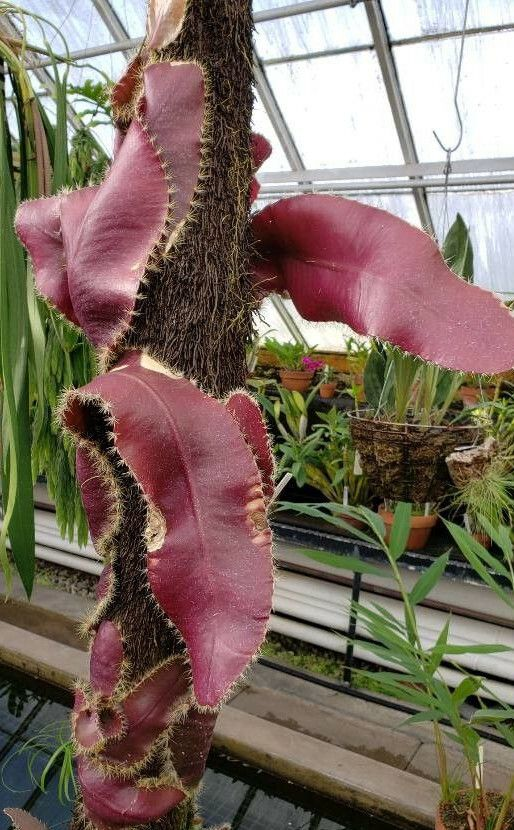
Climbing growth habit

The authors placed Selenicereus wittii back in Strophocactus, together with the former Pseudoacanthocereus sicariguensis and P. brasiliensis, and excluded the genus Strophocactus from the Hylocereeae. The placement as Strophocactus wittii is accepted by Plants of the World Online, as of February 2021.

== Distribution ==
Strophocactus wittii is common in the rainforests of the central Amazon basin along blackwater rivers. There the species grows in abundance in the crown area of the temporarily flooded floodplain forests. The distribution area extends along the Rio Negro and Rio Japurá in Brazil over the Río Vaupés, Río Apaporis and Caquetá in Colombia to northeast Peru in the Loreto region to the city of Iquitos and probably includes the southern area of the Amazon basin in Venezuela. In addition to Strophocactus wittii, only the two cactus species Rhipsalis baccifera and Epiphyllum phyllanthus grow there.

== Ecology ==
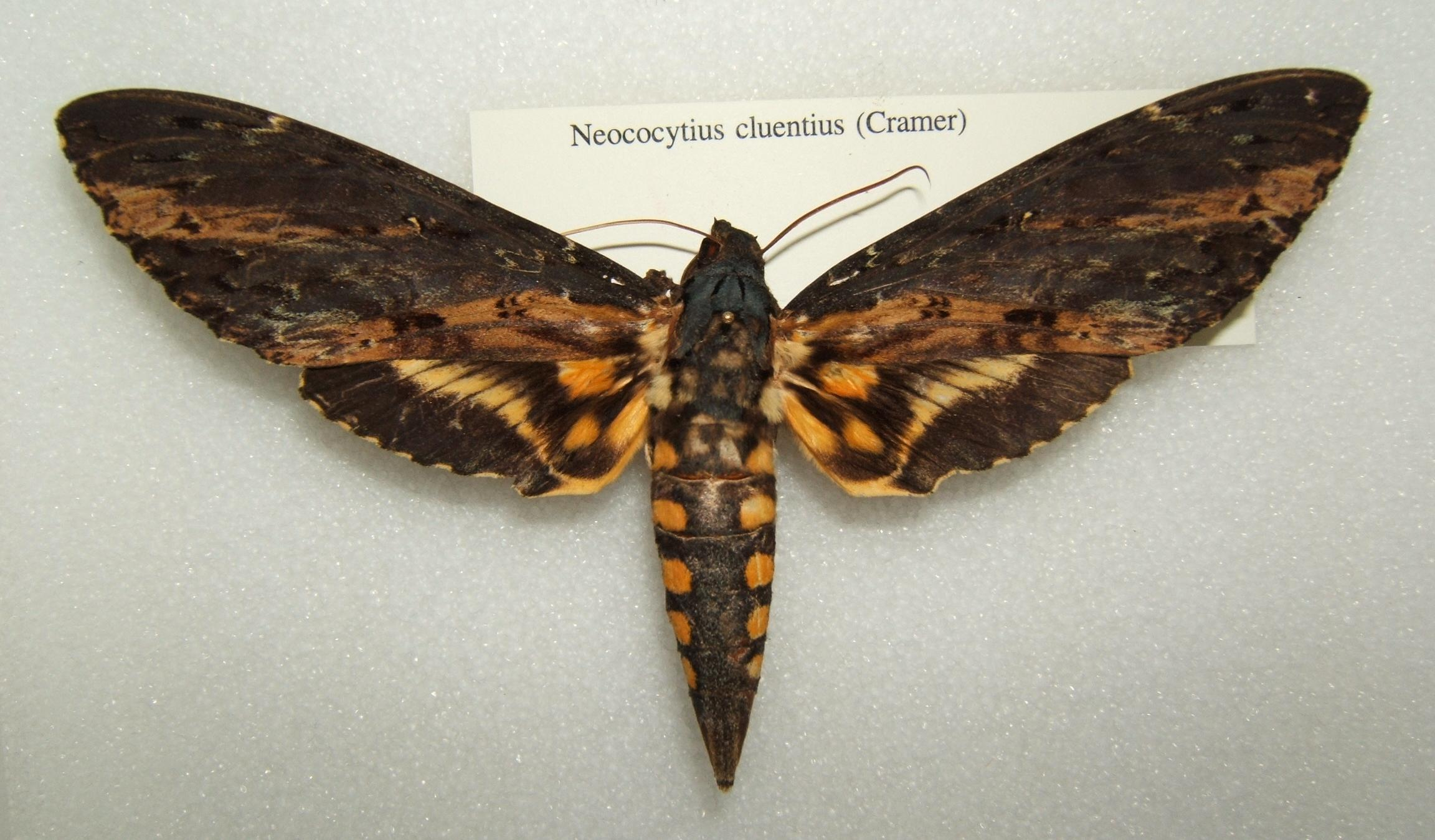
Neococytius cluentius – a possible pollinator of the species

=== Pollination ===
Certain flower characteristics, for example the pure white color, the extreme length of the flower tube, the scent and the nocturnal opening, indicate that the flowers are only pollinated by moths – in this case sphinx moths. However, pollination has not yet been observed in nature. Due to the length of the flower tube only two species occurring in the natural range of Strophocactus wittii have a sufficiently long proboscis (up to 25 cm): Neococytius cluentius (Note: Barthlott et al. (1997) use the binomial Cocytius "cruentus". They include Seitz (1940) as a reference. However, the list of species of the genus Cocytius in Seitz's work does not include the specific name "cruentus", but does include C. cluentius. O. Porsch in 1939 discussed the role of C. cluentius in pollinating cacti, giving the length of its tongue as 25 cm (p. 117) as well as the length of the flower of Strophocactus wittii as 23–25 cm (p. 103), although not specifically connecting the two.) and Amphimoea walkeri.

=== Spread ===
The structure of the seeds with their large, air-filled, outer cells of the seed coat differs from all other types of cactus. The floating seeds disperse through the water (hydrochory). The epiphytic orchid species Galeandra devoniana, which also lives in the Igapó forests of the Rio Negro, spreads in this way, as does the sundew Drosera amazonica.
