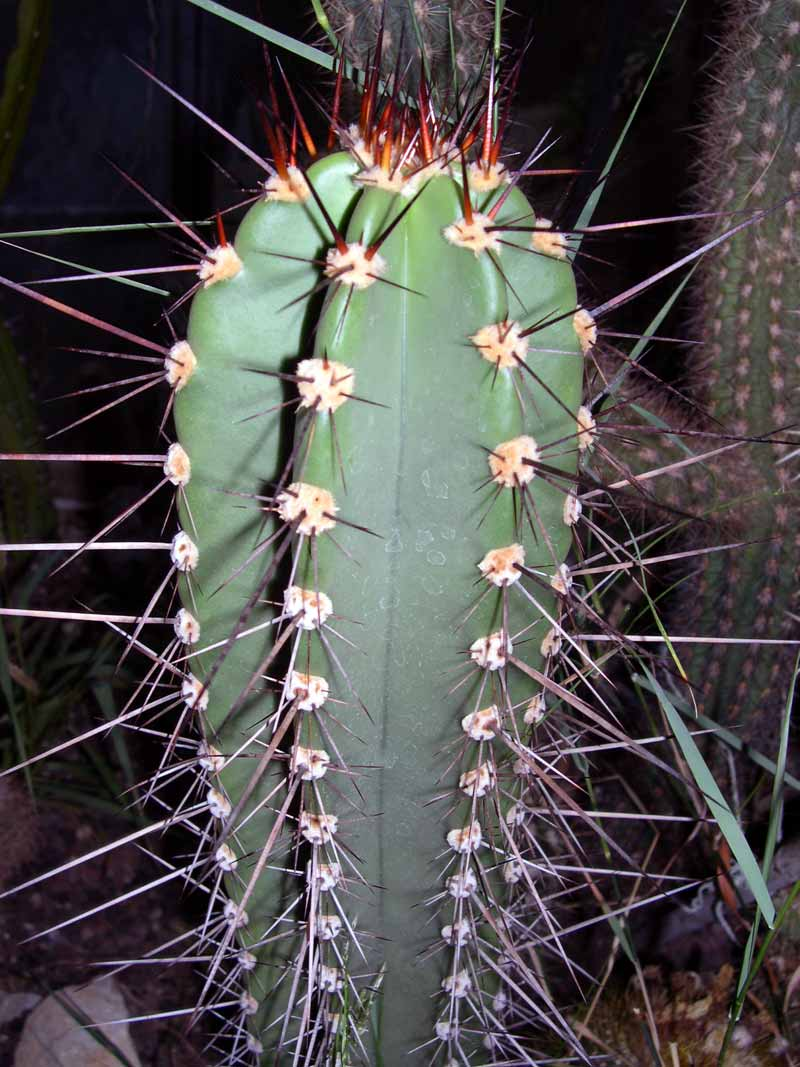

Conservation status
- Least Concern (IUCN 3.1)

Scientific classification
- Kingdom: Plantae
- Clade: Tracheophytes
- Clade: Angiosperms
- Clade: Eudicots
- Order: Caryophyllales
- Family: Cactaceae
- Subfamily: Cactoideae
- Genus: Neoraimondia
- Species: N. herzogiana

Binomial name
- Neoraimondia herzogiana (Backeb.) Buxb. & Krainz

Synonyms
- Neocardenasia herzogiana Backeb.

= Neoraimondia herzogiana =

Species of cacti

Neoraimondia herzogiana is a tree-like cactus (family Cactaceae) native to Bolivia.

== Description ==
Neoraimondia herzogiana is a shrub that grows in the form of a tree, candelabra-shaped, perennial and fleshy that reaches a height of 15 meters, with a diameter of 15 to 20 cm (5.9 to 7.9 in). It has 6-7 ribs and the areoles have 3-5 central spines and 7-10 radial spines that are 1-2 cm (0.79 in) long. The white or pink flowers, reach a diameter of 6 cm (2.4 in), are followed by edible fruits. The fruit has pericarp that is studded with small tufts of short, bristle-like spines. The ovoid, sweet and tasty fruits are yellowish brown and covered with thorns. They have a diameter of 5 cm (2.0 in) and are 5 to 6 cm (2.0 to 2.4 in) long.

== Distribution ==
Neoraimondia herzogiana is distributed in the Bolivian departments of Cochabamba, Chuquisaca, Santa Cruz and Tarija at altitudes of 600 to 1900 meters.

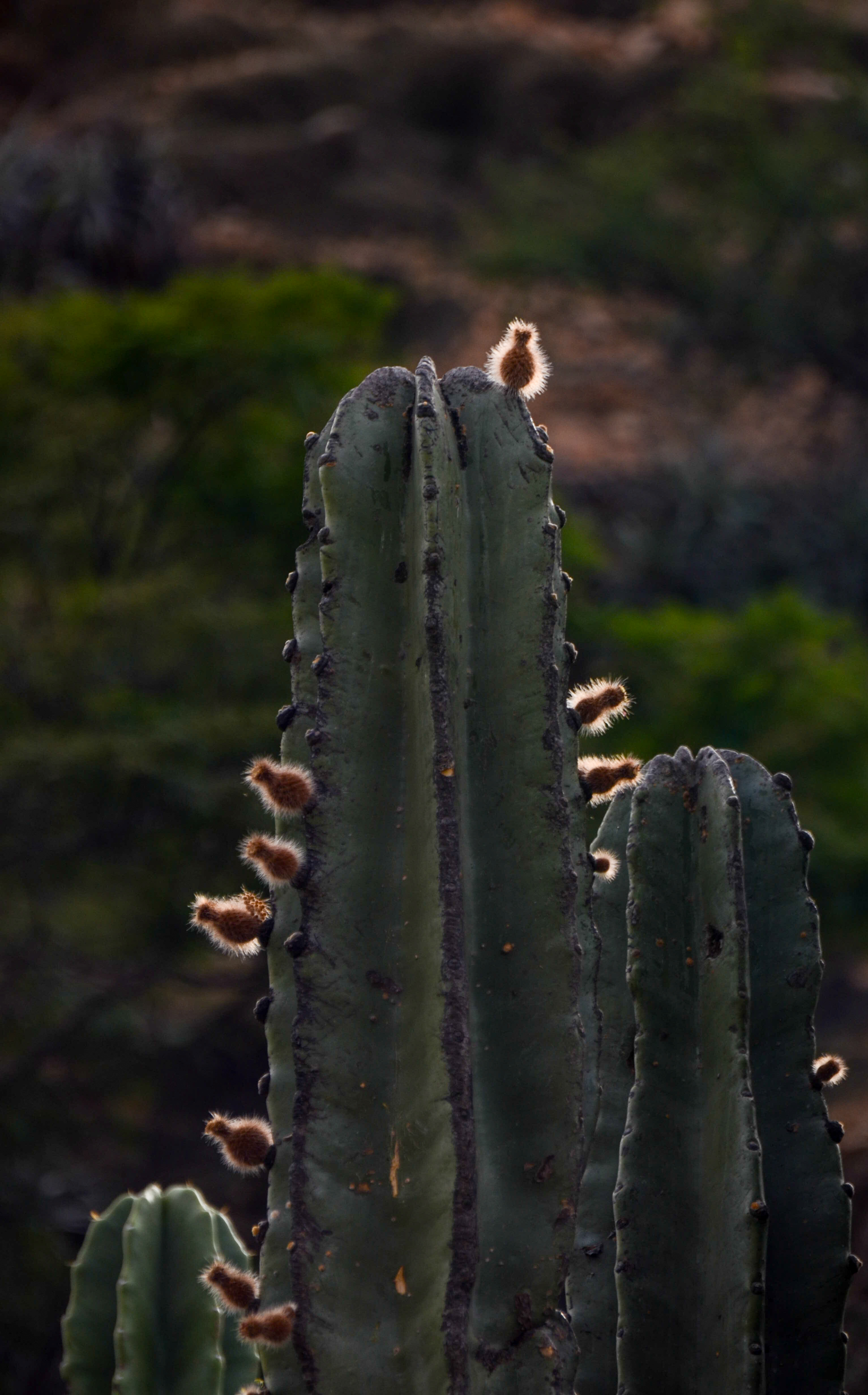
Plant budding in Municipal Protected Area Monte Willca

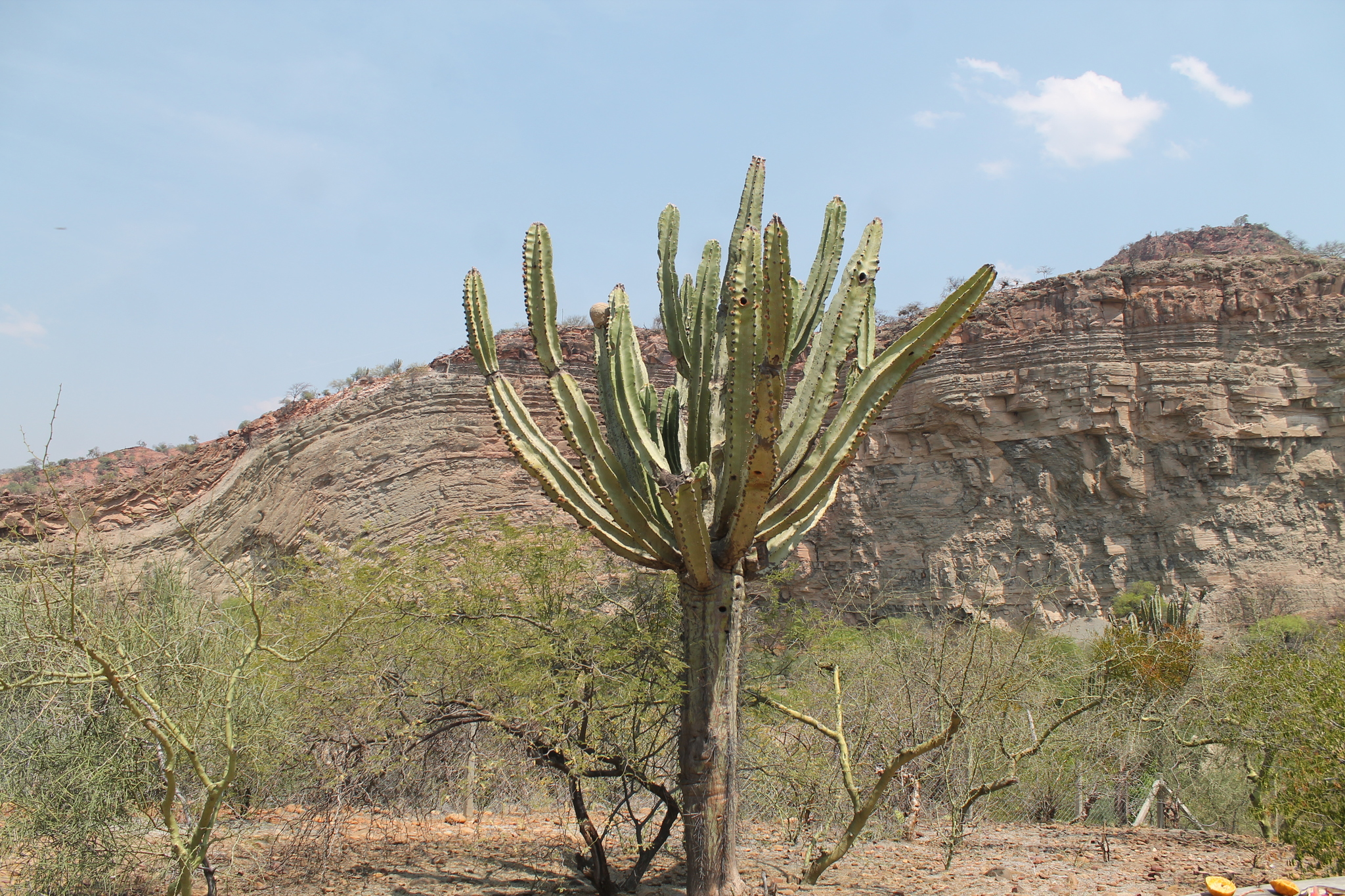
Habitat in Peña Colorado, Bolivia

== Taxonomy ==
The first description of Neocardenasia herzogiana was published in 1949 by Curt Backeberg. The plant was named in honor of botanist Theodor Carl Julius Herzog. Franz Buxbaum placed them in the genus Neoraimondia in 1967.

In the IUCN Red List of Threatened Species the species is listed as "Least Concern (LC)".
