= Christmas plants =

Vegetation associated with Christmas

Christmas plants are flowers or vegetation from garden plants associated with the festive season of Christmas. There are also a wide variety of plants that include "Christmas" in their common name.

== Africa ==
=== South Africa ===
Christmas Bell is one name given to Sandersonia ssp, A genus of South African plants.

== Asia ==
=== India ===
Decorative plants for Christmas celebrations may include species of Viscum, Lycopodium cernuum, and Acanthus ilicifolius.

=== Sri Lanka ===
Monterey Cypress trees are often used as Christmas trees due to their conical shape and their longevity once cut.

=== Thailand ===
Species used as Christmas trees include monkey puzzle trees, Casuarina equisetifolia, and C. junghuhniana.

== Europe ==
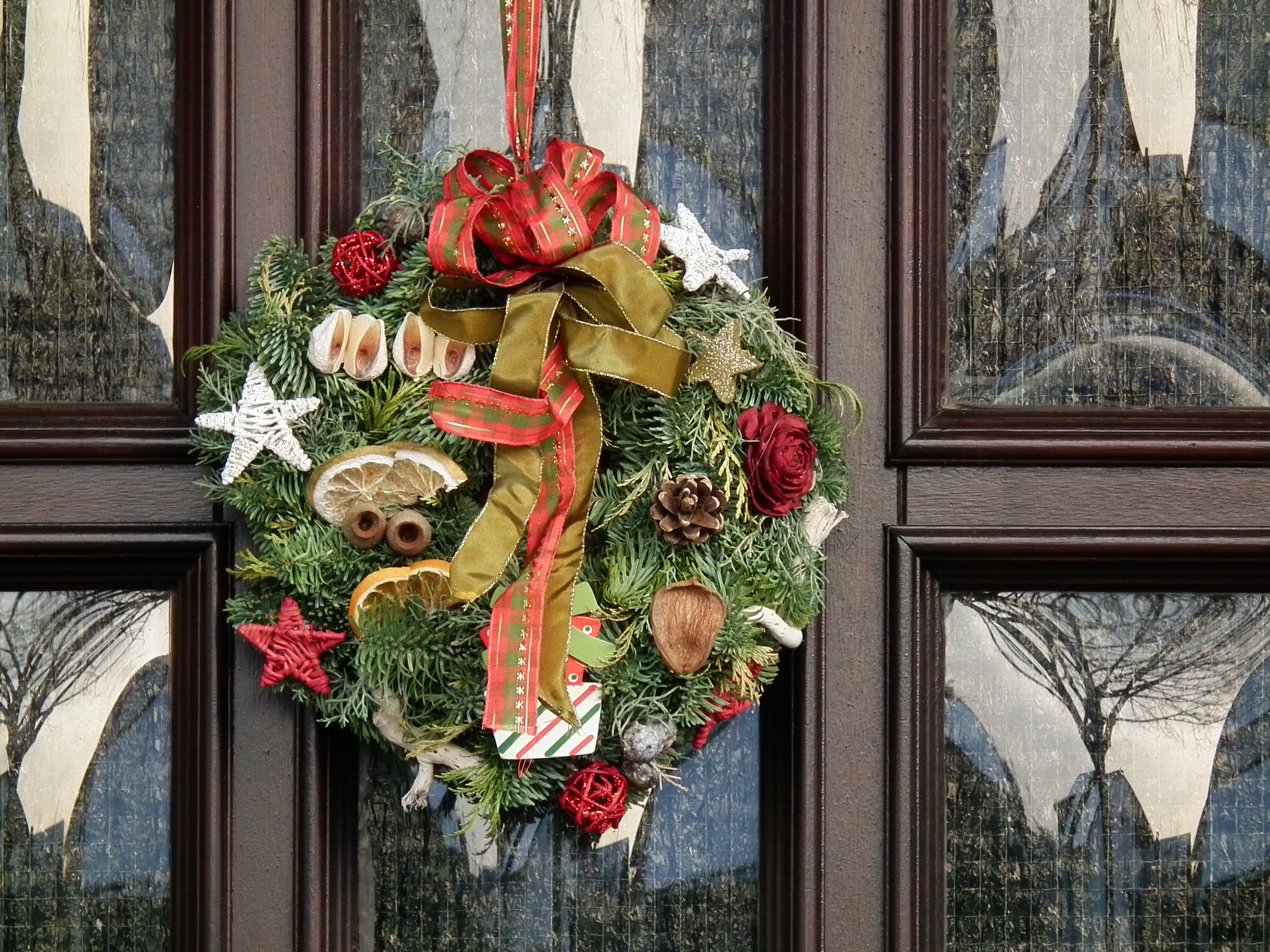
A holiday wreath

Plants commonly used for Christmas decoration and symbolism across Europe include ivy, mistletoe and holly. Ivy leaves are seen as symbolizing eternity and resurrection.

Christmas wreaths originated in Europe, and are traditionally made with spruce, pine or cedar branches, pinecones from evergreen trees, and holly berries or branches.

=== Balkans ===
The badnjak or budnik is a custom shared across the Balkan region involving a tree, tree branches, or a log being brought into the home and burned. The tradition may differ between countries like Bulgaria, Croatia, and Serbia.

=== Caucasus ===
==== Georgia ====
The chichilaki is the traditional Georgian Christmas tree, and is made from dried hazelnut or walnut branches that are shaved and shaped into a tree shape. They may be decorated with small fruits and berries.

=== Western Europe ===
Some common plants used to decorate in this region include English holly, winterberry, witch hazel, and Nordmann fir, which is commonly used in sprays. Lichens and mosses may be used as decorative garlands.

==== Germany ====
Plants specific to German sprays include acacia foliage and the cone-bearing branches of Douglas firs.

The Advent wreath specifically dates back to German Lutherans in the 1830s, although there are claims they can be traced back to the 16th century.

==== Ireland ====
Traditional decorative Christmas plants include holly, mistletoe, and poinsettias. Other plants, like Jerusalem cherry, English ivy, and potted azaleas, may also be encountered.

==== Spain ====
Tio de Nadal is a tradition from the Catalan region involving a log which is propped up and given a face. If the children of the home care for the log properly, it will defecate presents on Christmas Eve or Christmas Day.

==== United Kingdom ====
Some plants used for wreaths and sprays include English holly, cherry laurel, and Portugal laurel. By the end of the Middle Ages, English church records commonly referred to buying holly and ivy for seasonal decor. It was also common for wealthy households to buy greenery, also for decorative purposes; this is reflected in the 16th century Welsh carol, Deck the Halls. In the Tudor period, kissing boughs were a popular decoration, made by covering crossed hoops with available greenery. By the Georgian period, these boughs had become more elaborate, using apples and oranges. In the Victorian era, garlands made of holly and fir were popular decorations.

The yule log is a tradition in many Germanic countries, but has also become popular in the UK.

One older tradition involves bringing potted cherry or hawthorn trees indoors, so that they can flower at Christmastime.

== North America ==
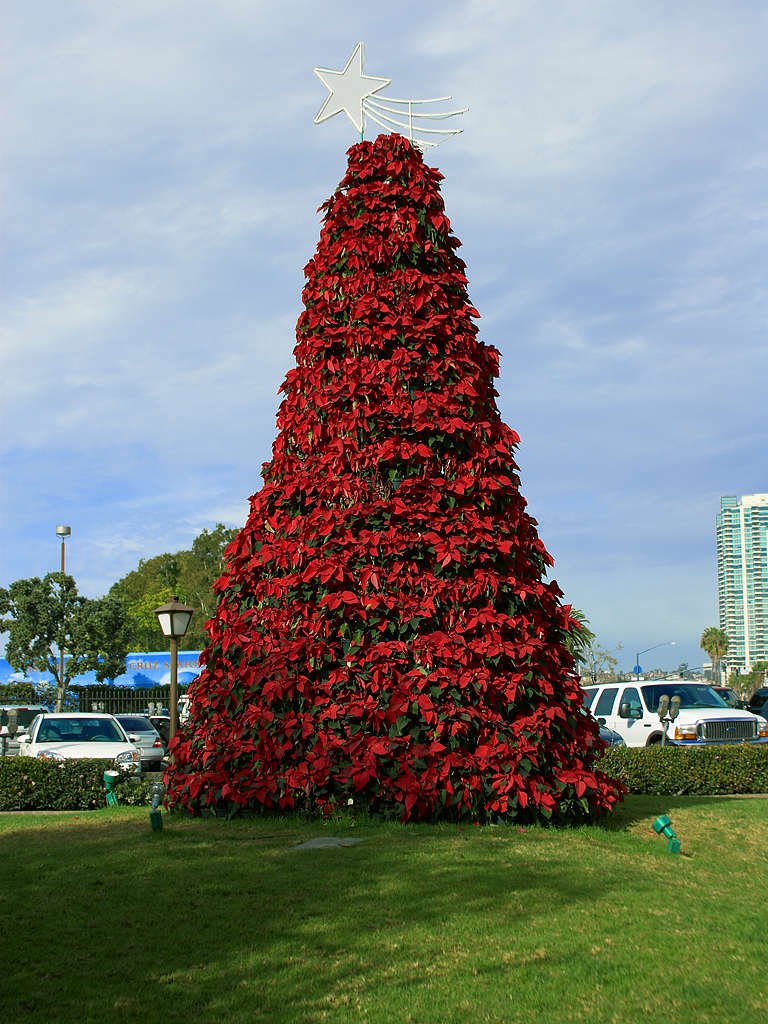
A Christmas tree made of poinsettias

Christmas Cactus, thus called because of when it flowers, is native to Brazil but is a popular ornamental plant in North America. Varieties include Schlumbergera opuntioides, Schlumbergera kautskyi, and Schlumbergera microsphaerica.

=== Caribbean ===
Historically, the Christmas tree of choice in the Caribbean has been the Caribbean pine, inkberry, or juniper. Festive flowering plants used for decoration include poinsettia, Porana pamiculala, and Antigonon leptopus.

=== Mexico ===
Poinsettias are native to Mexico and its Central American neighbors.

Radishes feature in the Christmas season tradition of Noche de Rábanos, or Night of the Radishes which is held on December 23 in Oaxaca City, Mexico. During the event participants carve large radishes into elaborate scenes.

=== United States ===
Christmas trees and wreaths were brought to the United States by various communities of European settlers and immigrants. The specific species of tree used for these traditions differs depending on region. On the west coast, the Douglas fir has historically been the species of choice when it comes to Christmas trees, while in Appalachia the Fraser fir is more popular.

In California wreaths have been made from coast redwood and hollyleaf cherry. Plants used in decorative arrangements include Christmas-berry, cypress, firethorn, and pepper-tree. In the southern part of the state decorative plants may also include citrus plants, eucalyptus, magnolias, and poinsettias.

In Texas and Louisiana decorative plants include Christmas fern, chrysanthemums, holly, American mistletoe, and poinsettias. Historically, Spanish moss and ball moss might be dipped in flour while wet. Once dry, they could be used as snowball decorations.

In southeast region of the country, decorative plants include camellias, holly, mistletoe, privet, quince, and Magnolia grandiflora. Wreaths and sprays may be made from the longleaf pine and the Australian pine.

Along the Gulf Coast, several different types of palms are used as decorative plants, including Sabal palletto, the royal palm, Washingtonia robusta, and Phoenix canariesis.

== Oceania ==
=== Australia ===
The name Tasmanian Christmas Bell is applied in Australia to Blandfordia ssp., including Blandfordia punicea.

Several different species of plants in Australia are referred to as Christmas Bush, including:

- Correa, a genus of Australian plants with distinctive bell shaped
- Chromolaena odorata
- Ceratopetalum gummiferum - New South Wales Christmas bush, ornamental tree.
- Prostanthera lasianthos - Victorian Christmas bush.

Several plants in Australia are referred to or used as Christmas trees, including Nuytsia floribunda and the Norfolk Island pine, which is commonly sold in Australian stores during the Christmas season and is usually marketed as a "Living Christmas tree".

=== New Zealand ===
Pōhutukawa, sometimes called the New Zealand Christmas Tree, has bright red flowers which usually appear in December.

Alstroemeria pulchella, known as the New Zealand Christmas bell, is a popular ornamental plant during the Christmas season.

== Misc ==
Christmas tree is applied to a number of plants:

- fir, spruce, pine, balsam or other evergreen trees decorated for Christmas
- Pinus pinea or the Italian stone pine, is another plant commonly sold in stores as a potted live plant.

Christmas rose can be any of the following:

- Helleborus ssp., especially Helleborus niger
- a species of hydrangea, Hydrangea macrophylla
- Serissa foetida (also known as "snow rose" or "winter rose") originally from tropical regions of Asia; cultivated Serissa often blooms during the winter.

Other plants with "Christmas" in their name include:

- "Christmas costus" (Costus chartaceus)
- "Christmas moss" (Vesicularia montagnei)

== See also ==
- Christmas tree
- Christmas flowers
