= H. rosea =

H. rosea may refer to:

- Haliotis rosea, the black abalone, a sea snail species
- Hechtia rosea, a plant species
- Hatiora rosea, a synonym of Schlumbergera rosea, an epiphytic species of cactus

== Synonyms ==
- Hyphelia rosea, a synonym for Trichothecium roseum

== See also ==
- Rosea (disambiguation)
