= Schlumbergera orssichiana =

Conservation status
- Endangered (IUCN 3.1)

Scientific classification
- Kingdom: Plantae
- Clade: Tracheophytes
- Clade: Angiosperms
- Clade: Eudicots
- Order: Caryophyllales
- Family: Cactaceae
- Subfamily: Cactoideae
- Genus: Schlumbergera
- Species: S. orssichiana

Binomial name
- Schlumbergera orssichiana Barthlott & McMillan

Species of cactus

Schlumbergera orssichiana is a species of plant in the family Cactaceae. It is endemic to a small area of the coastal mountains of south-eastern Brazil where its natural habitat is moist forest. It grows on trees as an epiphyte. It is in the same genus as the popular houseplant known as Christmas cactus or Thanksgiving cactus.

== Description ==
Schlumbergera orssichiana resembles other species of the genus Schlumbergera in that it has leafless green stems which act as photosynthetic organs. The stems (cladodes) are composed of strongly flattened segments, which have "teeth" of varying shapes along their edges, where there are generally two to three, and at the ends. Individual segments are large, 5–7.5 cm (2.0–3.0 in) long by 3.2–4.5 cm (1.3–1.8 in) wide.

Special structures characteristic of cacti, called "areoles", occur at the end of the segments. The areoles are where the flower buds appear. The large flowers, which open widely, are held at a slight angle to the vertical, with the higher side somewhat different from the lower side (slightly zygomorphic). They usually appear pinkish in overall colour, as the individual tepals shade from white at the centre to red at the tips. Each flower is about 9 cm (3.5 in) long by 9 cm (3.5 in) across. The inner petals are fused at the base to form a short "floral tube", about 10 mm (0.4 in) long, at the base of which nectar is present. The species can be in flower up to three times a year (August, November and March in cultivation in the Northern Hemisphere).

The many stamens are arranged in two series, which is a distinctive characteristic of the genus. The inner stamens are fused at the base to form a short tubular structure. The outer stamens arise from along the floral tube. Each is about 5.5–6.5 cm (2.2–2.6 in) long, with white filaments and yellow anthers and pollen. The style is dark red and has a stigma with 6–8 lobes; the style plus stigma is roughly the same length as the stamens. If the flower is fertilized, a fleshy fruit forms which is greenish yellow to cream with five or six ribs. The dark brown seeds are about 1 mm in diameter.

== Taxonomy ==
The species was discovered in the wild by Countess Orssich (hence the specific epithet orssichiana) and cultivated in her garden in Brazil, from where specimens were sent to Europe. It was given a scientific name in 1978 by Wilhelm A. Barthlott and A.J.S. McMillan. S. orssichiana has been hybridized in cultivation with S. truncata to create the hybrid S. × reginae or S. Reginae Group.

== Distribution and habitat ==
S. orssichiana occurs only in the coastal mountains of south-east Brazil, in the states of São Paulo and Rio de Janeiro, in the southernmost part of the tropics. Sites where it has been found include Morro dos Três Picos in the Serra do Mar and the Serra da Bocaina. Plants are found at altitudes of around 1,000 metres (3,300 ft) Because of their altitude and proximity to the Atlantic Ocean, the coastal mountains have high humidity – warm moist air is forced upwards into higher, colder locations where it condenses. S. orssichiana grows on trees (epiphytic).

== Cultivation ==
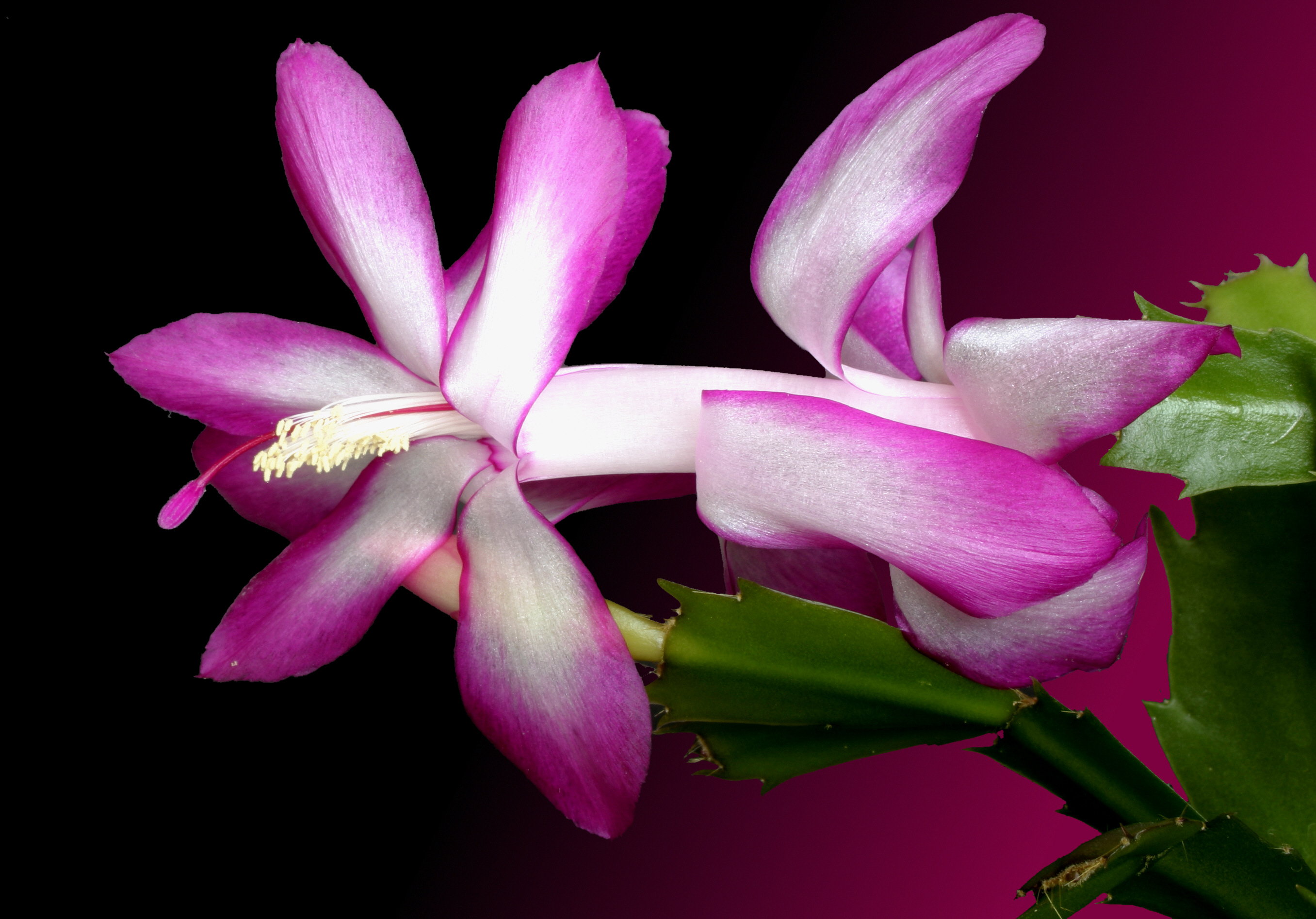
S. Reginae Group 'Bristol Queen'

S. orssichiana is mainly grown in the form of its hybrids with other species of the genus, particularly the artificial hybrid S. orssichiana × S. truncata, which has been called S. × reginae McMillan or S. Reginae Group. The hybrid S. orssichiana × S. russelliana has also been made in cultivation; it has been given the name S. × eprica Süpplie. Cultivars of both of these two hybrids are sometimes called "The Queens".

These plants and their cultivation are discussed at Schlumbergera: Cultivation.
