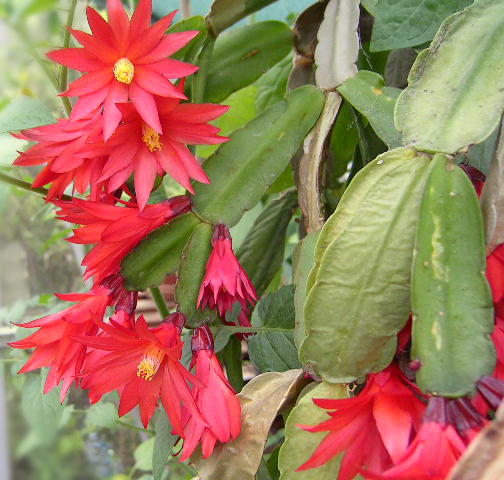
- In cultivation

Scientific classification
- Kingdom: Plantae
- Clade: Tracheophytes
- Clade: Angiosperms
- Clade: Eudicots
- Order: Caryophyllales
- Family: Cactaceae
- Subfamily: Cactoideae
- Genus: Rhipsalidopsis
- Species: R. gaertneri

Binomial name
- Rhipsalidopsis gaertneri (K.Schum.) Linding.

Synonyms
- List: Epiphyllopsis gaertneri (Regel) A.Berger ex Backeb. & F.M.Knuth; Epiphyllum gaertneri (Regel) K.Schum.; Epiphyllum makoyanum Pynaert; Epiphyllum russellianum var. gaertneri Regel i; Hatiora gaertneri (Regel) Barthlott; Phyllocactus gaertneri (Regel) K.Schum.; Rhipsalidopsis serrata Linding., no Latin descr.; Rhipsalis gaertneri (Regel) Vaupel; Schlumbergera gaertneri (Regel) Britton & Rose

= Rhipsalidopsis gaertneri =

Species of cactus

Rhipsalidopsis gaertneri, synonyms Schlumbergera gaertneri and Hatiora gaertneri, is a species of epiphytic cactus which belongs to the tribe Rhipsalideae within the subfamily Cactoideae of the Cactaceae. Together with the hybrid with R. rosea, Rhipsalidopsis × graeseri, it is known, in English speaking countries in the Northern Hemisphere, as Easter cactus or Whitsun cactus and is a widely cultivated ornamental plant. It has received the Royal Horticultural Society's Award of Garden Merit.

== Description ==
Rhipsalidopsis gaertneri is found in southeastern Brazil, in Paraná and Santa Catarina, at altitudes of 350–1,300 m (1,100–4,300 ft). R. gaertneri grows on trees (epiphytic) or less often rocks (lithophytic) in sub-tropical rain forest. With maturity, it develops into a branching pendant leafless shrub with a woody base. The stems are made up of segments, most of which are flattened and which are the photosynthetic organs (cladodes) of the plant. Younger segments are dullish green, 4–7 cm (1.6–2.8 in) long and 2–2.5 cm (0.8–1.0 in) wide, with small notches on the margins. Structures characteristic of cacti, called areoles, form in these notches. Flowers form from areoles at the ends of the stems. These are scarlet in colour, 4–5 cm (1.6–2.0 in) long, radially symmetrical (actinomorphic), opening to a funnel shape with a maximum diameter of about 4–7.5 cm (1.6–3.0 in). Red oblong fruits form after the flowers are fertilized.

== Taxonomy ==
Although cacti belonging to the tribe Rhipsalideae are quite distinct in appearance and habit from other cacti, as they grow on trees or rocks as epiphytes or lithophytes, for a long time there has been confusion as to how the species should be placed into genera. Rhipsalidopsis gaertneri was first described in 1884 by Eduard von Regel as the variety gaertneri of Epiphyllum russellianum (now Schlumbergera russelliana). The name honours one of the Gaertner family, early settlers in Blumenau, Brazil.

The species has had a complex taxonomic history. In 1889, William Watson elevated it to the full species Epiphyllum gaertneri and in 1913, Nathaniel Britton and Josephy Rose transferred it to Schlumbergera as S. gaertneri. The relationship to S. russelliana was based on the appearance of the stems, made up of somewhat flattened segments with small teeth, and the radially symmetrical shape of the flowers. However, the deeper structure of the flower differs from Schlumbergera species, which have a short floral tube at the base of the flower formed by fused petals, and stamens arranged in two distinct series, whereas Rhipsalidopsis gaertneri has separate petals and a single series of stamens. Rh. gaertneri was separated from Schlumbergera as Rhipsalis gaertneri by Friedrich Vaupel in 1925, after which it was successively transferred to Epiphyllopsis by Alwin Berger in 1929, Rhipsalidopsis by Karl Hermann Leonhard Lindinger in 1942, and Hatiora by Wilhelm Barthlott in 1987. It was put back in Schlumbergera as the result of molecular phylogenetic studies in 2011, and then restored to Rhipsalidopsis again.

In horticultural sources, the Easter cactus continued to be referred to as Schlumbergera gaertneri (even when other sources placed it in Hatiora), as well as Rhipsalidopsis gaertneri.

== Cultivation ==
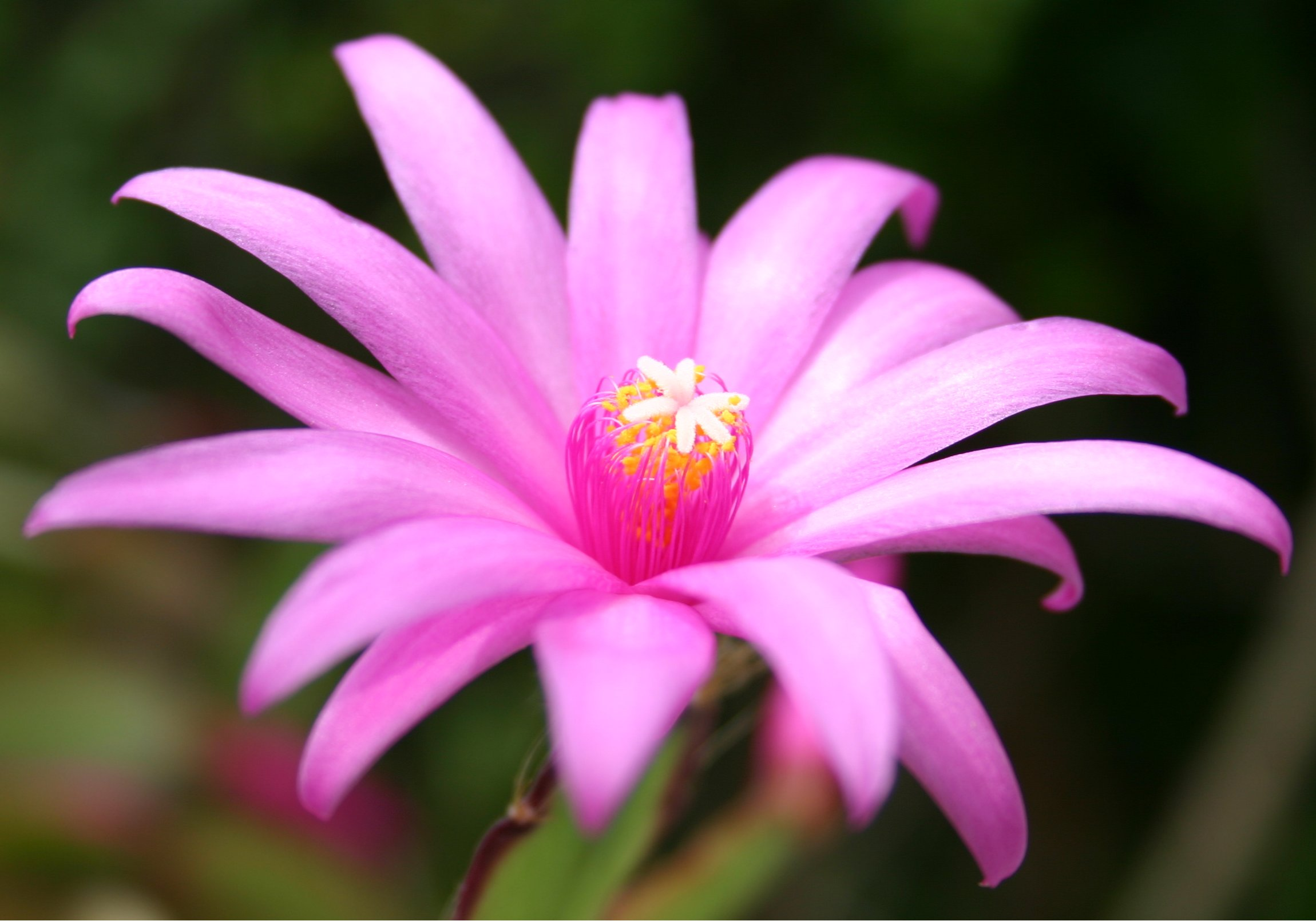
Flower of Rhipsalidopsis × graeseri cultivar

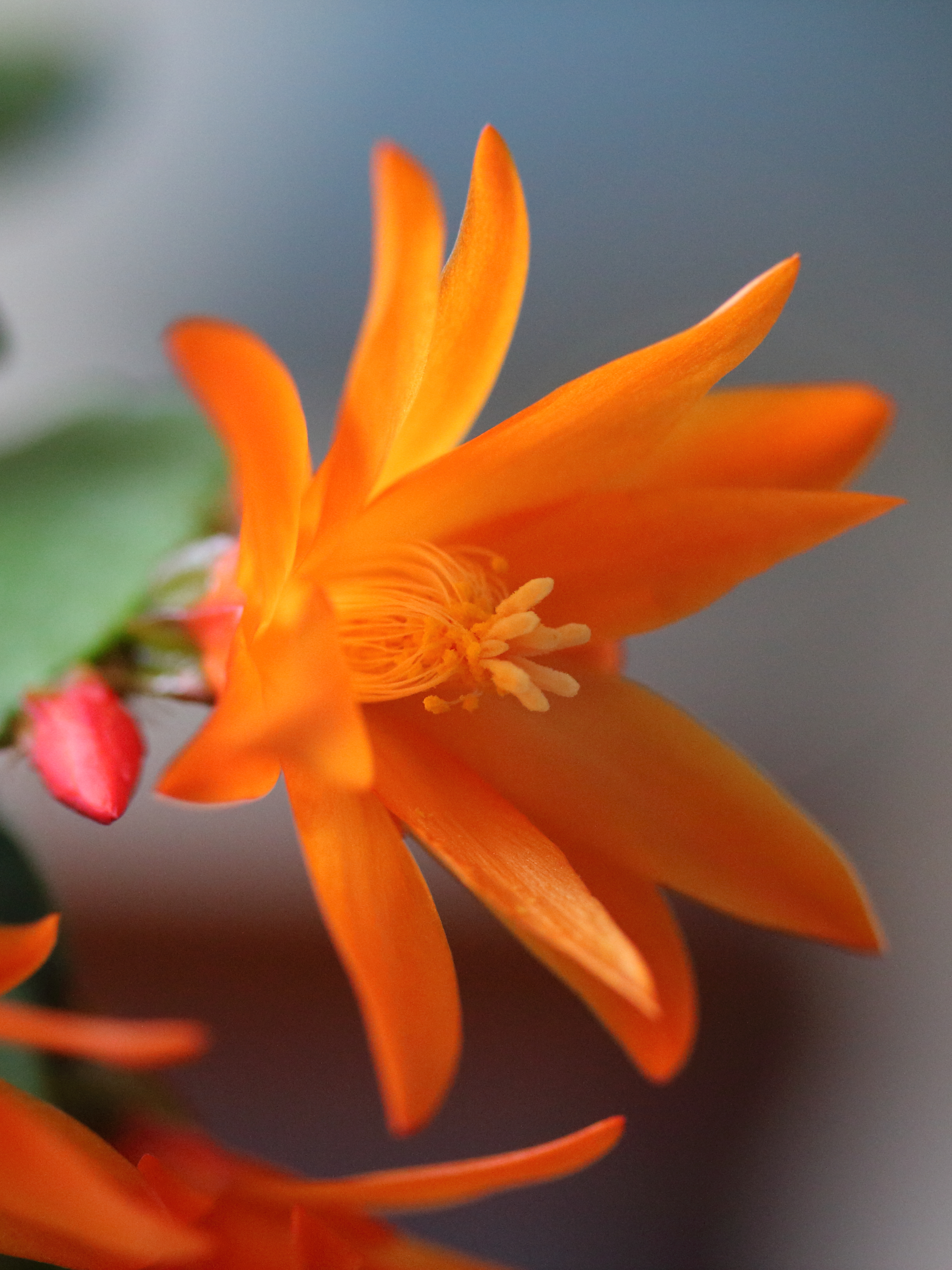
Flower of Rhipsalidopsis × graeseri cultivar

Under the name Easter cactus or Whitsun cactus, Rhipsalidopsis gaertneri is widely cultivated as an ornamental plant for its scarlet flowers. Its common names reflect the period in which it flowers in the Northern Hemisphere, namely late Spring. It has been artificially crossed with a pink-flowered species, Rhipsalidopsis rosea, to form the hybrid Rhipsalidopsis × graeseri, cultivars of which have flowers in a wider range of colours.

The Easter cactus is considered more difficult to grow than the Christmas or Thanksgiving cactus (cultivars and hybrids of Schlumbergera). Recommendations for care include:

- Temperature Summer temperatures around 25 °C (77 °F) are suggested, with lower temperatures down to 7–13 °C (45–55 °F) in the winter (November to January in the Northern Hemisphere) to initiate good bud formation.
- Light As epiphytic forest plants, they are not exposed to strong sunlight. Half-shade is recommended; plants can be placed outside in the summer.
- Watering The Easter cactus is said to respond badly to over- or under-watering, e.g. by losing stem segments; continuously moist soil is recommended.
- Propagation Stem segments may be removed in late Spring and the cut surface allowed to dry out before being placed in slightly moist soil.

== Images ==
(Red Easter Cactus)

(Pink Easter Cactus)

== Bibliography ==
- Anderson, Edward F. (2001), The Cactus Family, Pentland, Oregon: Timber Press, ISBN 978-0-88192-498-5
