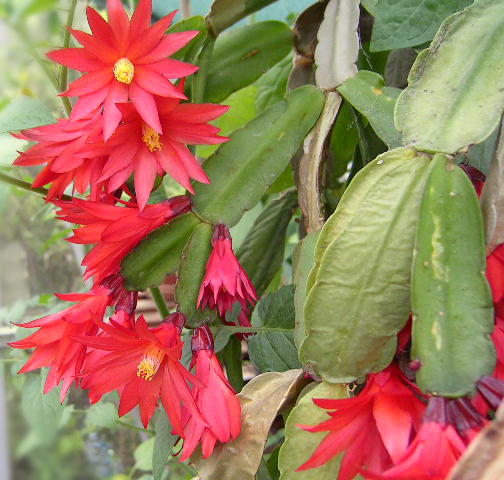
- Rhipsalidopsis gaertneri in cultivation

Scientific classification
- Kingdom: Plantae
- Clade: Tracheophytes
- Clade: Angiosperms
- Clade: Eudicots
- Order: Caryophyllales
- Family: Cactaceae
- Subfamily: Cactoideae
- Tribe: Rhipsalideae
- Genus: Rhipsalidopsis; Britton & Rose

Species
- See text.

= Rhipsalidopsis =

Genus of flowering cactus

Rhipsalidopsis is a small genus of flowering plant in the family Cactaceae, native to southern Brazil. Like other members of the tribe Rhipsalideae, its species are epiphytes, growing on trees.

== Taxonomy ==
The genus Rhipsalidopsis was established by Nathaniel Lord Britton and Joseph Nelson Rose in 1923. The generic name means 'like Rhipsalis'. They transferred one species from Rhipsalis to their new genus as Rhipsalidopsis rosea. The presence of a short tube at the base of the flower where the petals were fused was regarded as one of the diagnostic features. The taxonomy of genera like Rhipsalidopsis that are placed in the tribe Rhipsalideae was described as confused by Anderson in 2001, with species moved among Rhipsalis, Hatiora and Schlumbergera in particular. A molecular phylogenetic study in 2011 showed that two species then placed in Hatiora were separate from other species in the genus and could be placed in an expanded Schlumbergera. Others placed them in a revived genus Rhipsalidopsis.

=== Species ===
As of January 2023, Plants of the World Online accepted the following species:

Image	Scientific name	Distribution
	Rhipsalidopsis gaertneri (Regel) Linding.	Brazil (Paraná and Santa Catarina)
	Rhipsalidopsis rosea (Lagerh.) Britton & Rose	Brazil.

An artificial hybrid between these two species is also known:

Image	Scientific name	Distribution
	Rhipsalidopsis × graeseri David Hunt, 1992	Brazil
