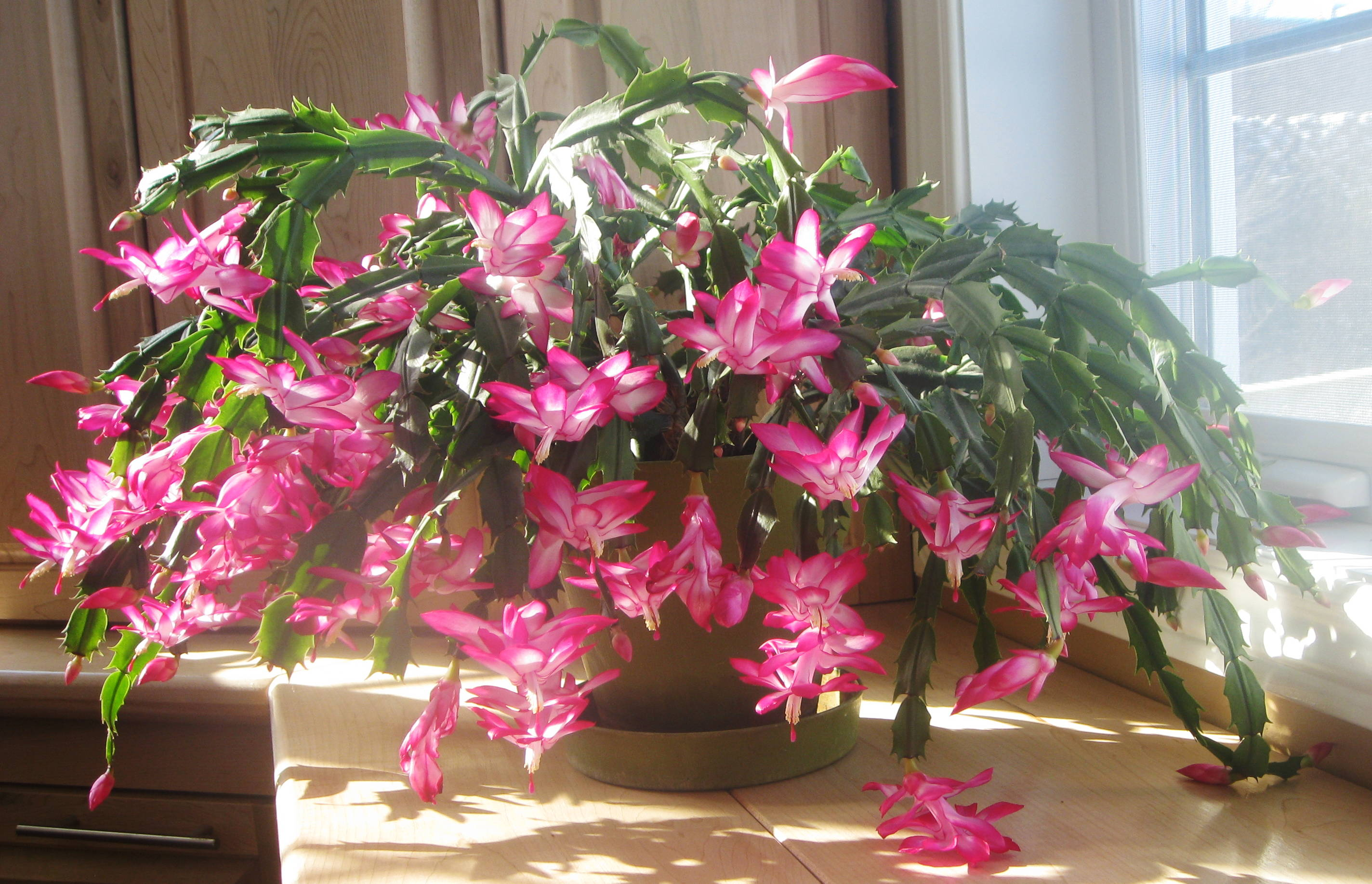
- Cultivar belonging to the Schlumbergera Truncata Group

Scientific classification
- Kingdom: Plantae
- Clade: Tracheophytes
- Clade: Angiosperms
- Clade: Eudicots
- Order: Caryophyllales
- Family: Cactaceae
- Subfamily: Cactoideae
- Tribe: Rhipsalideae
- Genus: Schlumbergera; Lem.

Species
- See text.

= Schlumbergera =

Genus of cacti

Schlumbergera is a small genus of cacti with six to nine species native to the coastal mountains of southeastern Brazil. These plants grow on trees or rocks in habitats that are generally shady with high humidity, and can be quite different in appearance from their desert-dwelling cousins. Most species of Schlumbergera have stems which resemble leaf-like pads joined one to the other and flowers which appear from areoles at the joints and tips of the stems. Two species have cylindrical stems more similar to other cacti.

Common names for these cacti generally refer to their flowering season. In the Northern Hemisphere, they are called Christmas cactus, Thanksgiving cactus, crab cactus and holiday cactus. In Brazil, the genus is referred to as Flor de Maio ("May flower"), reflecting the period in which they flower in the Southern Hemisphere. Most of the popular houseplants are cultivars of Schlumbergera, rather than species, with flowers in white, pink, yellow, orange, red or purple. The Easter cactus or Whitsun cactus, placed in the genus Rhipsalidopsis, is also called a holiday cactus and has flowers in red, orange, pink and white.

The cultivars of the Christmas cactus fall into two main groups:

- The Truncata Group contains all cultivars with features derived mainly from the species S. truncata: stem segments with pointed teeth; flowers held more or less horizontally, usually above the horizontal, and whose upper side is differently shaped from the lower side (zygomorphic); and yellow pollen. They generally flower earlier than members of the Buckleyi Group and, although common names are not applied consistently, may be distinguished as Thanksgiving cactus, crab cactus or claw cactus.
- The Buckleyi Group contains all cultivars with at least some features clearly showing inheritance from S. russelliana: stem segments with rounded, more symmetrical teeth; more or less symmetrical (regular) flowers which hang down, below the horizontal; and pink pollen. They generally flower later than members of the Truncata Group and are more likely to be called Christmas cactus.

== Description ==
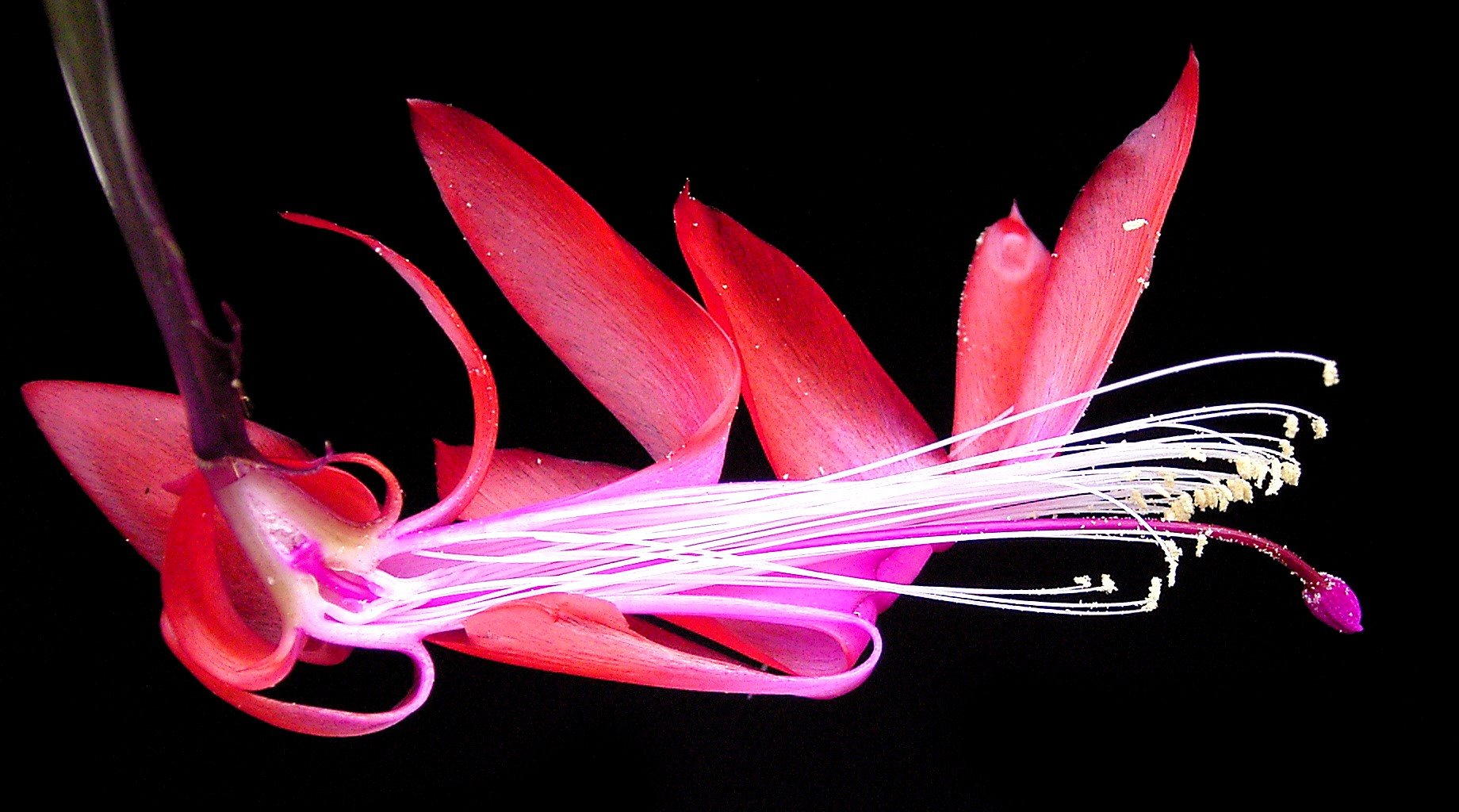
Zygomorphic flower, probably of a cultivar in the Truncata Group, cut in half to show its internal structure

In the wild, Schlumbergera species grow either on trees (epiphytic) or on rocks (epilithic) and can form sizeable shrubs with woody bases; a height of up to 1.2 m (4 ft) has been reported for one species (S. opuntioides). They are leafless, the green stems acting as photosynthetic organs. The stems are composed of segments, which take one of two forms. In most species the segments are strongly flattened (cladodes), being made up of a central core with two (or more rarely three) "wings". Special structures characteristic of cacti, called "areoles", then occur at the ends of the segments of the stem. In two species the stems are less flattened, more cylinder-shaped, and the areoles are arranged in a more or less spiral pattern all over the segments. In both cases, the areoles, which may have wool and bristles, are where the flower buds appear.

The flowers either hang downwards and are almost regular (radially symmetrical or actinomorphic) or, as in most species, are held more or less horizontally with the higher side of the flower different from the lower side (radially asymmetrical or zygomorphic). In those species whose flowers are held up, their angle with the horizontal is relatively constant and is characteristic of the species. Each flower has 20–30 tepals. The outer tepals (those closer to the base of the flower) are short and unconnected, and spread out or curve backwards. The inner tepals (those towards the tip of the flower) are longer and in most species become progressively more fused together at the base to form a floral tube. In some species the difference between the outer and inner tepals creates the appearance of a "flower within a flower". The flowers produce nectar in a chamber at the base of the floral tube.

In most species, the many stamens are arranged in two series, with the inner stamens being fused at the base to form a short tubular structure and the outer stamens arising from along the floral tube. The style is usually dark red and has a stigma with 6–8 lobes; the style plus stigma is roughly the same length as a stamen. If the flower is fertilized, a fleshy fruit forms, either smooth or with ribs. The brown or black seeds are about 1 mm in diameter.

== Taxonomy ==
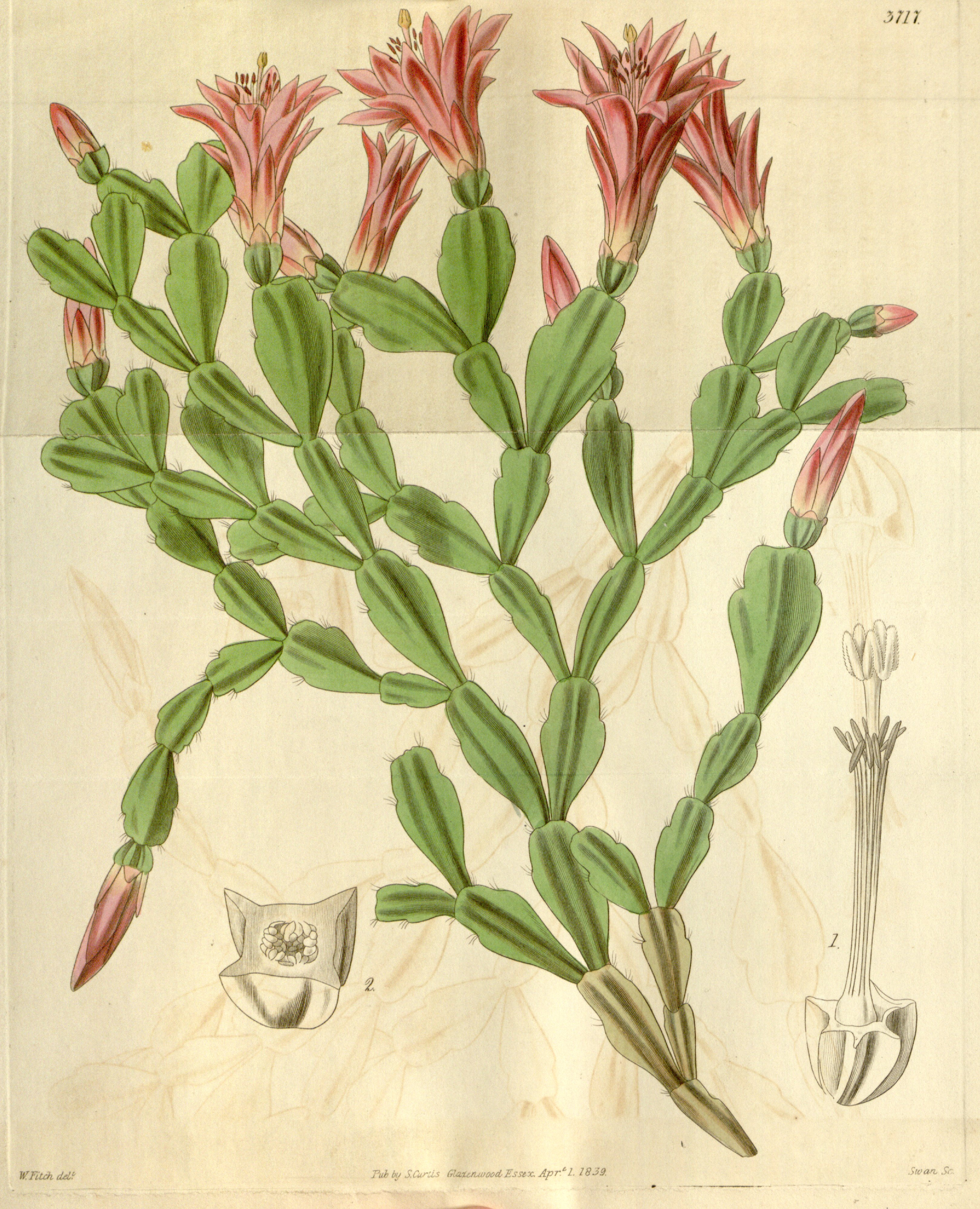
Drawing of S. russelliana, the type species, from the Botanical Magazine, 1839

The genus is one of a small number belonging to a group of cacti classified as the tribe Rhipsalideae. Species of cacti belonging to this group are quite distinct in appearance and habit from most other cacti since they grow on trees or rocks as epiphytes or lithophytes. Although the species are easy to identify as members of the Rhipsalideae, for many years there was confusion as to how they should be divided into genera. This confusion extended to Schlumbergera, whose complicated taxonomic history has been detailed by McMillan and Horobin. The modern genus Schlumbergera was created by Charles Lemaire in 1858. The name commemorates Frédéric Schlumberger, who had a collection of cacti at his chateau near Rouen. Lemaire placed only one species in his new genus – a plant discovered in Brazil in 1837 which had been named Epiphyllum russellianum by William J. Hooker. Lemaire renamed it Schlumbergera epiphylloides (under the current rules of botanical nomenclature it should have been called Schlumbergera russelliana, which is its current name).

Lemaire noted the similarity of his Schlumbergera epiphylloides to a species first described as Epiphyllum truncatum by Adrian Hardy Haworth in 1819, but did not accept that the two species should be included in the same genus. In 1890, Karl Moritz Schumann created the new genus Zygocactus, transferring Epiphyllum truncatum to Zygocactus truncatus. Although he later placed it back in Epiphyllum, abandoning Zygocactus, the generic name Zygocactus continued to be widely used.

In 1913, Nathaniel Britton and Joseph Rose followed Lemaire in keeping Schlumbergera russelliana and Zygocactus truncatus in separate genera. They also transferred the Easter cactus to Schlumbergera as S. gaertneri, initiating a lasting confusion between these two genera.

In 1953, Reid Venable Moran placed both Schlumbergera russelliana and Zygocactus truncatus in the genus Schlumbergera. Other species were added later by David Hunt, including those formerly placed in Epiphyllanthus.

Schlumbergera and Hatiora have long been confused. Species in the former genus generally have flowers that are zygomorphic with a distinct floral tube, while those in the latter have actinomorphic flowers with inconspicuous tubes. DNA data showed that as previously circumscribed the two genera are not monophyletic and the three species in Hatiora subgenus Rhipsalidopsis were transferred into Schlumbergera, although this change has not been universally adopted, with other sources placing two in the genus Rhipsalidopsis.

=== Synonymy ===
The following genera are now synonyms of Schlumbergera (i.e. they have no species not moved into Schlumbergera):

- Epiphyllanthus A.Berger
- Opuntiopsis Knebel (nom. inval.)
- Zygocactus K.Schum.
- Zygocereus Frič & Kreuz. (orth. var.)
- Epiphyllum Pfeiff. but not Epiphyllum Haw.

The case of Epiphyllum is complex. In 1753, Carl Linnaeus created the genus Cactus. As more species were discovered this proved too broad, and new genera were set up to subdivide the cacti. The genus Epiphyllum was created in 1812 by Haworth, based on Linnaeus's Cactus phyllanthus. In 1831, Johann Link created the genus Phyllocactus based on the same species. Following Ludwig Pfeiffer in 1837, the European tradition was to use Phyllocactus for epiphytic cacti with large regular flowers and Epiphyllum for the irregular-flowered species now called Schlumbergera truncata. Under modern rules, Phyllocactus is an illegitimate name, as is Epiphyllum in the sense of Pfeiffer; thus Epiphyllum Pfeiff. is a synonym of Schlumbergera. The true genus Epiphyllum Haw. now has around 19 species.

=== Species ===
Between six and nine species are currently recognized. In the narrowest circumscription, Schlumbergera sensu stricto, six species are accepted. Only synonyms which have been widely used (and their basionyms) are given in the list below.

- Schlumbergera kautskyi (Horobin & McMillan) N.P.Taylor
  - syn. S. truncata subsp. kautskyi Horobin & McMillan
- Schlumbergera microsphaerica (K.Schum.) Hoevel
  - syn. Cereus microsphaerica K.Schum., Epiphyllanthus microsphaericus (K.Schum.) Britton & Rose, Cereus obtusangulus K.Schum., Epiphyllanthus obtusangulus (K.Schum.) A.Berger, Zygocactus obtusangulus (K.Schum.) Loefgr., S. obtusangula (K.Schum.) D.R.Hunt
- Schlumbergera opuntioides (Loefgr. & Dusén) D.R.Hunt
  - syn. Epiphyllum opuntioides Loefgr. & Dusén, Zygocactus opuntioides (Loefgr. & Dusén) Loefgr., Epiphyllanthus opuntioides (Loefgr. & Dusén) Moran
- Schlumbergera orssichiana Barthlott & McMillan
- Schlumbergera russelliana (Hook.) Britton & Rose
  - syn. Epiphyllum russellianum Hook., S. epiphylloides Lemaire, nom. illeg.
- Schlumbergera truncata (Haw.) Moran
  - syn. Epiphyllum truncatum Haw., Zygocactus truncatus (Haw.) K.Schum., nom. illeg.

In a wider circumscription, one species formerly placed in Hatiora is transferred into Schlumbergera.

- Schlumbergera lutea Calvente & Zappi, syn. Hatiora epiphylloides (Porto & Werderm.) P.V.Heath

Two species that have been placed in Hatiora or Schlumbergera are placed in Rhipsalidopsis by Plants of the World Online as of January 2023:

- Rhipsalidopsis gaertneri (Regel) Linding. (Easter cactus, Whitsun cactus)
  - syns. Hatiora gaertneri (Regel) Barthlott, Schlumbergera gaertneri (Regel) Britton & Rose
- Rhipsalidopsis rosea (Lagerh.) Britton & Rose
  - syns. Hatiora rosea (Lagerh.) Barthlott, Schlumbergera rosea (Lagerh.) Calvente & Zappi

Four hybrids of Schlumbergera s.s. have been named, all made in cultivation (although the first may possibly occur in the wild). The International Code of Nomenclature for Cultivated Plants recommends that cultivated plants should be named under its rules, not those appropriate for natural species and hybrids. The Group names given below were provided by McMillan and Horobin.

- Schlumbergera × buckleyi (T.Moore) Tjaden = S. russelliana × S. truncata; S. Buckleyi Group
  - syn. Epiphyllum buckleyi T.Moore, E. rollissonii T.Moore, S. bridgesii (Lemaire) Loefgr.
- Schlumbergera × eprica Süpplie = S. orssichiana × S. russelliana
- Schlumbergera × exotica Barthlott & Rauh = S. truncata × S. opuntioides; S. Exotica Group
- Schlumbergera × reginae McMillan = S. truncata × S. orssichiana; S. Reginae Group

== Distribution, habitat and ecology ==
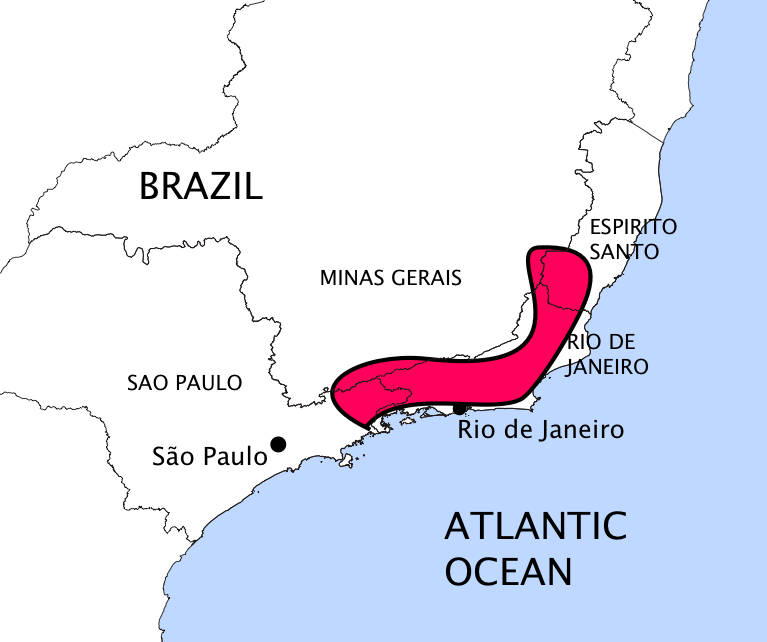
The distribution of most Schlumbergera species is discontinuous within the red area.

Schlumbergera occurs only in the coastal mountains of south-east Brazil, in the states of São Paulo, Rio de Janeiro, Minas Gerais, and Espírito Santo. Its observed range extends from close to the Tropic of Capricorn northwards to 20°S. I.e. in the southernmost part of the tropics. Plants grow at altitudes from 700 metres (2,300 ft) in the case of S. truncata to 2,780 metres (9,120 ft) in the case of S. microsphaerica, either in the coastal moist forests or in rocky areas. The natural distribution of Schlumbergera species has become confused because European cultivars were deliberately introduced into some areas, including the Serra dos Órgãos National Park, by the Brazilian Agricultural Department, to compensate for over-collecting of wild plants.

Because of their height and proximity to the Atlantic Ocean, the coastal mountains produce high-altitude moist forests – warm moist air is forced upwards into higher, colder locations where it condenses. Schlumbergera species grow in habitats which are generally relatively cool, shaded and of high humidity. David Hunt describes collecting specimens in conditions of cloud, drizzle and overnight temperatures down to −4 °C (25 °F). Plants are epiphytic or lithophytic, growing on moss-covered tree branches or in rock crevices, often in small pockets of substrate formed from decayed leaves and other vegetation. S. microsphaerica is found at higher altitudes, above 2,200 metres (7,200 ft), in barren rocky habitats, and tolerates higher light levels.

The flowers of Schlumbergera have adaptations for pollination by hummingbirds: tubular flowers with abundant nectar, and colours towards the red end of the spectrum. Most species require cross-pollination to set seed. The exceptions are S. kautskyi and S. microsphaerica; as noted above, the latter is found at higher altitudes where hummingbirds may be absent or less common.

The fruits of Schlumbergera do not open spontaneously when ripe, and appear to be adapted for distribution by birds, which eat the seeds and pulp contained in the fruit. Birds have been observed removing seeds which had stuck to their beaks by rubbing them on tree branches, where the seeds might be able to germinate. Segments may also break off from the stems and take root, thus enabling plants to propagate vegetatively.

== Cultivation of Christmas cacti ==
=== History ===
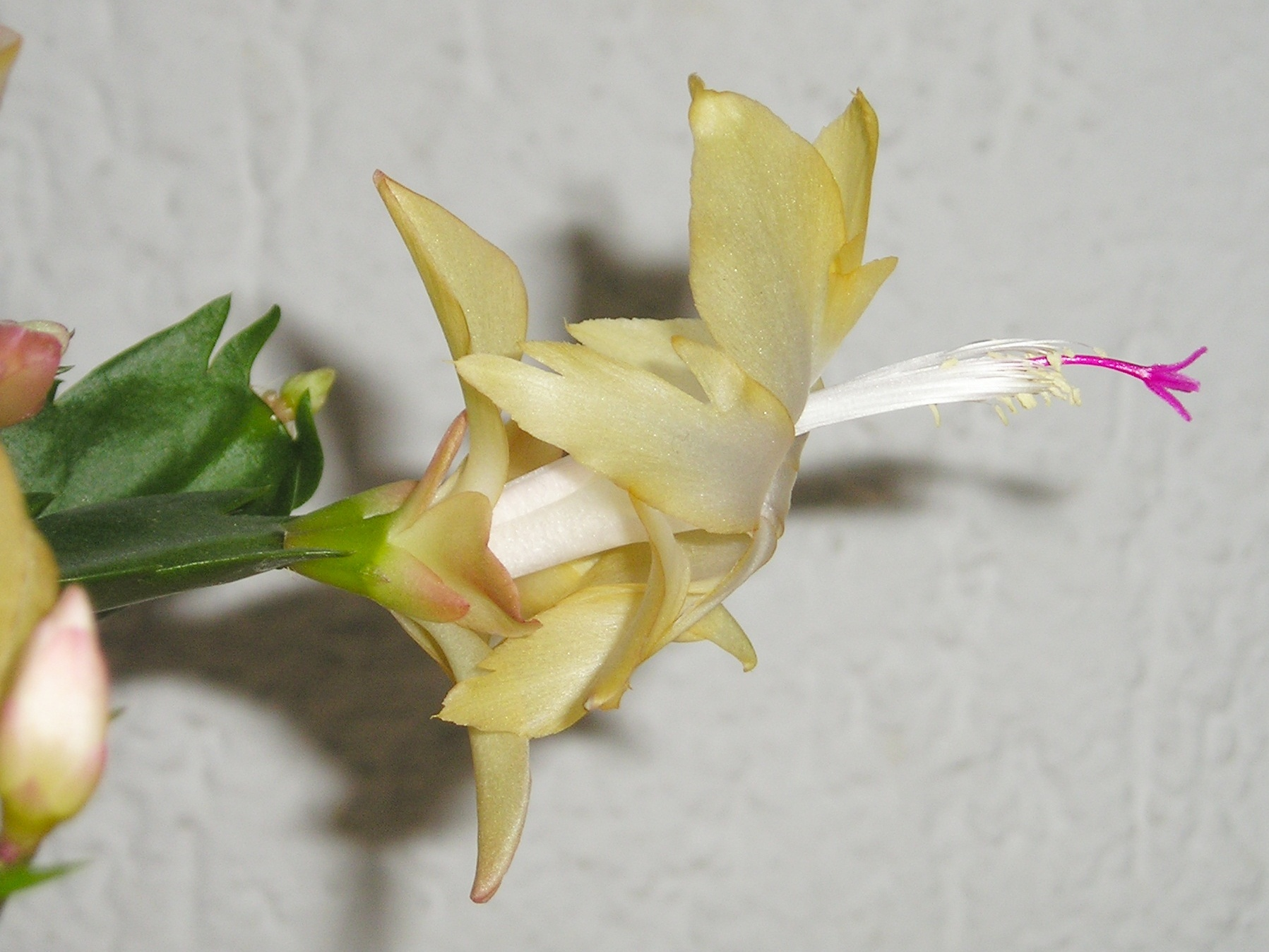
S. Truncata Group 'Gold Charm'; note the very pointed teeth at the end of the segments, zygomorphic flowers held above the horizontal, and yellow pollen.

Schlumbergera truncata was in cultivation in Europe by 1818, and S. russelliana was introduced in 1839. The two species were deliberately crossed in England by W. Buckley, resulting in the hybrid now called S. × buckleyi, first recorded in 1852. By the 1860s, a substantial number of cultivars (cultivated varieties) were available in a range of colours and habits, and were used as ornamental plants in "stoves" (heated greenhouses) and in homes, where they were popular for their autumn and winter flowering. Many cultivars were selected seedlings of S. truncata, but at least three S. × buckleyi hybrids were available, of which one, now called S. 'Buckleyi', is thought to be the original Christmas cactus. By the early part of the 20th century, the genus had become less popular, and many of the early cultivars were lost.

From around the 1950s onwards, breeding resumed in Europe, North America, Australia and New Zealand. New plants were produced by crossing among the species and existing cultivars of S. truncata, S. russelliana and the hybrid S. × buckleyi. Treatments which induced mutations were also used. The result was a wide range of flower colours which had not been available before, including the first true yellow to be sold commercially, S. 'Gold Charm' (which was a sterile triploid). Breeders aimed for plants which grew strongly, were upright at the point of sale rather than pendulous, had many flowers or buds, and were adapted to living as houseplants.

In the 1980s the species S. orssichiana was also used in crosses. The hybrid of S. truncata and S. orssichiana has been named S. × reginae or S. Reginae Group; one of the first cultivars was S. 'Bristol Queen'. S. opuntioides crosses have also been made, but have not resulted in commercially available cultivars.

=== Modern cultivars ===
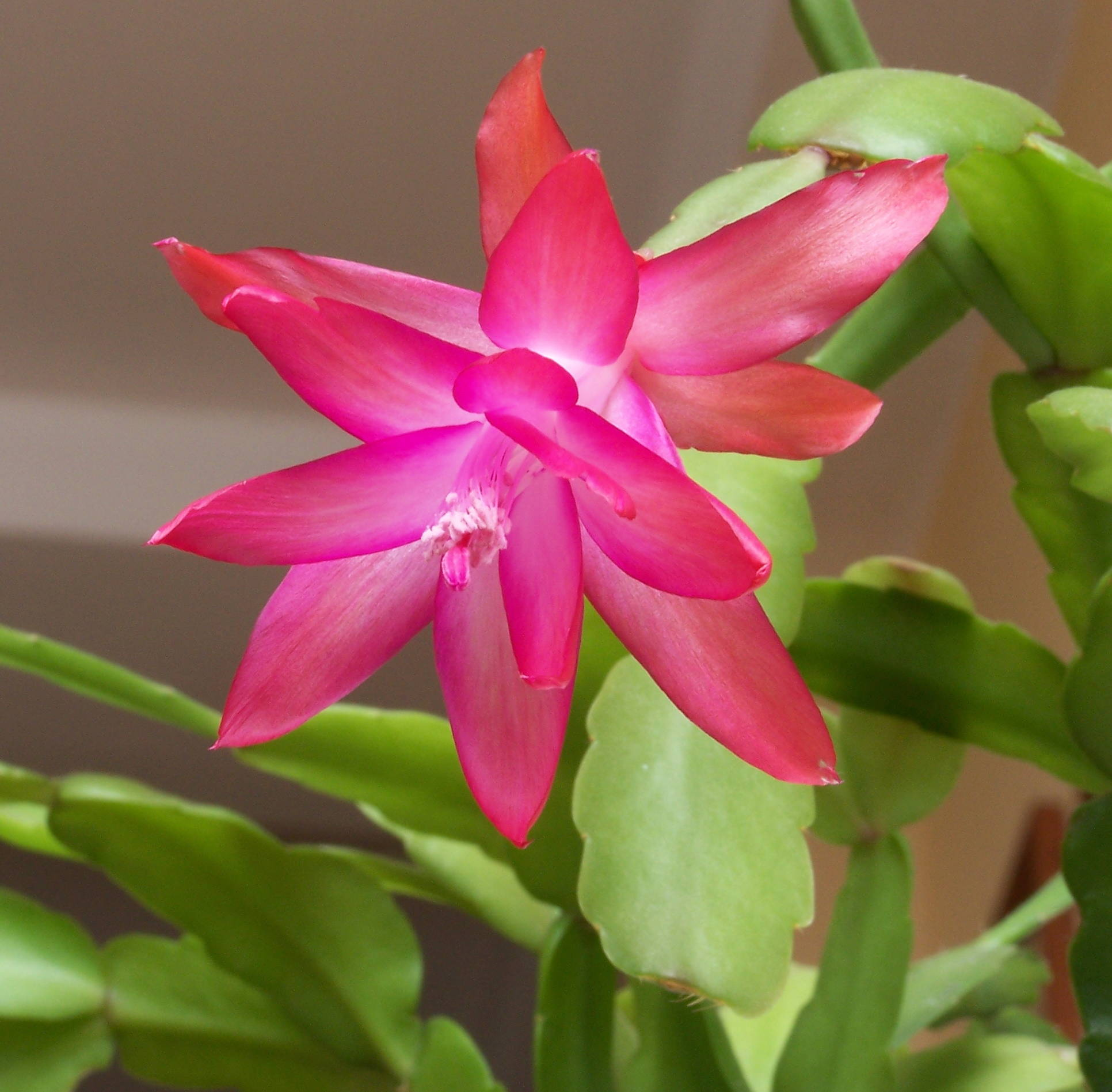
Member of the S. Buckleyi Group, viewed from below; rounded rather than pointed edges of the segments, pendant more or less regular flowers and pink pollen.

McMillan and Horobin have listed hundreds of modern European, North American and Australian cultivars of the Christmas cactus, which they put into a number of cultivar groups:

- The Truncata Group contains all cultivars with mainly S. truncata characteristics: stem segments with pointed teeth (dentate); zygomorphic flowers held more or less horizontally, usually above the horizontal; and yellow pollen.
- The Buckleyi Group contains all cultivars with at least some features clearly showing inheritance from S. russelliana: stem segments with rounded, more symmetrical teeth (crenate); more regular flowers which hang down, below the horizontal; and pink pollen. There is considerable variation within this group, and McMillan and Horobin introduced subcategories: "TB" for those more like S. truncata and "BT" for those more like the classic S. × buckleyi, with "B" reserved for the first generation (F1) S. × buckleyi hybrids.
- The Reginae Group contains cultivars known to be derived from hybrids with S. orssichiana.
- The Exotica Group is used for the small number of hybrids involving S. opuntioides.

Attempts have also been made to classify cultivars by colour. A difficulty is that the flowers of many cultivars exhibit different colours depending on the temperature during bud formation and growth. In particular, temperatures below 14 °C (57 °F) produce pink tones in otherwise white and yellow cultivars, and deepen the colour in pink and red cultivars. The availability of iron has also been suggested to affect flower colour.

In the United States, cultivars are propagated in large numbers for sale before Thanksgiving Day (the fourth Thursday in November). In Europe, plants are mainly sold later in the year, in the period before Christmas. A single Dutch grower (de Vries of Aalsmeer, the Netherlands) was reported in 1989 as producing 2,000,000 plants per year.

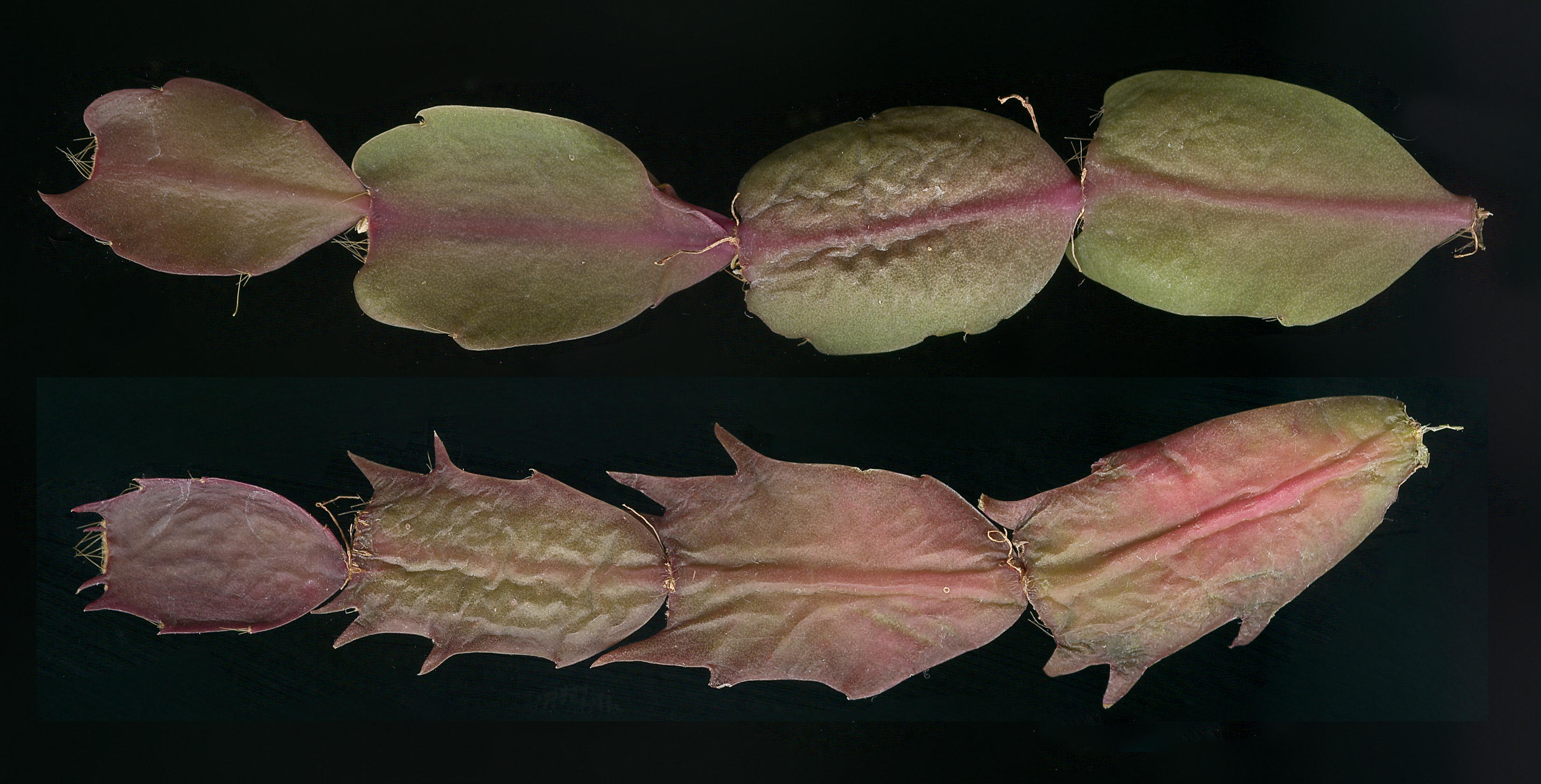
Variation in stem shapes in Schlumbergera cultivars: top – typical of the Buckleyi Group; bottom – typical of the Truncata Group

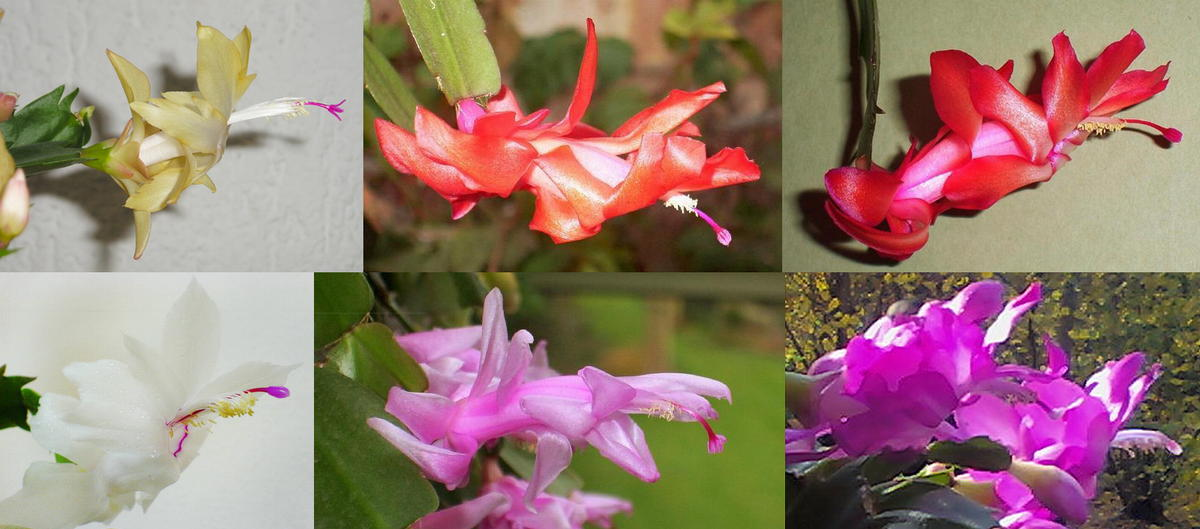
Variation in flower colour in modern Truncata Group cultivars; there are also bi-coloured flowers

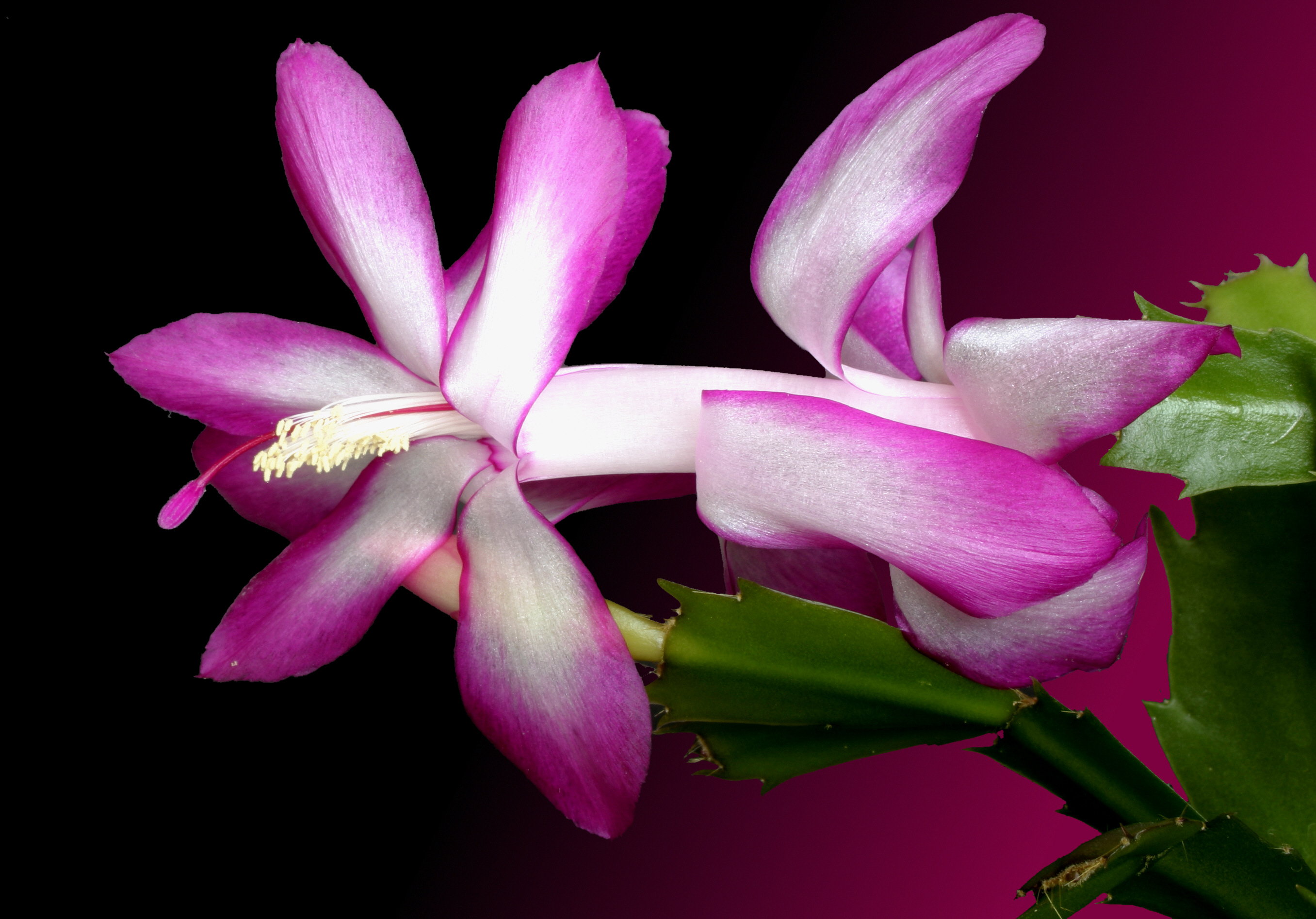
S. Reginae Group 'Bristol Queen'

=== Common names ===
Plants are offered for sale under a variety of common names. The earliest English common name was "Christmas cactus". In Europe, where plants are largely produced for sale in the period before Christmas, this remains the most widely used common name in many languages for cultivars of all groups (e.g. Weihnachtskaktus in German, cactus de Noël in French, and cacto de Navidad in Spanish). This is also the name used in Canada. In the United States, where plants are produced for the Thanksgiving holiday in November, the name "Thanksgiving cactus" is used; "Christmas cactus" may then be restricted to cultivars of the Buckleyi Group, particularly the very old cultivars such as 'Buckleyi'. In Russia they are known as dekabrist ("decembrist") and rozhdestvennika ("christmasist") - due to the time of flowering. The name "crab cactus" (referring to the clawed ends of the stems) is also used for the Truncata Group. "Link cactus" is another common name, describing the way that the stems of the genus as a whole are made up of linked segments. The name "chain cactus" is common in New Zealand, and may also refer to Hatiora or Rhipsalidopsis species.

The Easter cactus or Whitsun cactus was placed in the genus Rhipsalidopsis as of January 2023, but was at one time included in Schlumbergera (or one of its synonyms). The name "holiday cactus" has been used to include both Schlumbergera and Rhipsalidopsis cultivars.

=== Care of cultivars ===
When grown as house plants, Schlumbergera cultivars are said to be relatively easy to care for. McMillan and Horobin describe in detail their cultivation in both commercial and domestic conditions. Their specific recommendations include:

- Growing medium: Free-draining, humus-rich, somewhat acid growing media are used for commercial production, such as a mixture of peat or leafmould and an inert material such as grit, sharp sand or polystyrene beads. It is recommended that plants should be grown in relatively small pots; half-height pots are suitable.
- Watering: They are more tolerant of drought than many house plants, though not as drought tolerant as the desert cactus. They can be damaged by both under- and over-watering. Keeping the growing medium just moist throughout the year avoids either extreme.
- Light: They can be damaged by exposure to more than small amounts of sunlight. Members of the Buckleyi Group, such as the old-fashioned Christmas cactus with pendant flowers, are more tolerant of high light levels than members of the Truncata Group, such as most of the modern cultivars. Too much light causes stems to take on a reddish colouration; however, very low light levels will prevent flowering. Day length is important in controlling flowering; continuous darkness for at least 12 hours is necessary to induce bud formation. A period of about 8 days with 16 hours of darkness at 16 °C (61 °F) has been shown to cause flower buds to form. Lower temperatures slow this process. The advice sometimes given to withhold water to produce flower buds has been shown to be incorrect.
- Temperature: Holiday cacti grow best when they are placed in a location with partial shade, with a temperature between 70 and 80 °F (21 and 27 °C). They can not tolerate temperature less than 10 °C (50 °F).
- Propagation: Both commercially and in the home, propagation can be achieved by using short pieces of stem, one to three segments long, twisted off rather than cut. Cuttings are allowed to dry for 1–7 days, forming a callus at the broken end, and then rooted in an open growing medium. Temperatures above 21 °C (70 °F) and up to 27 °C (81 °F) in long day/short night conditions speed rooting.
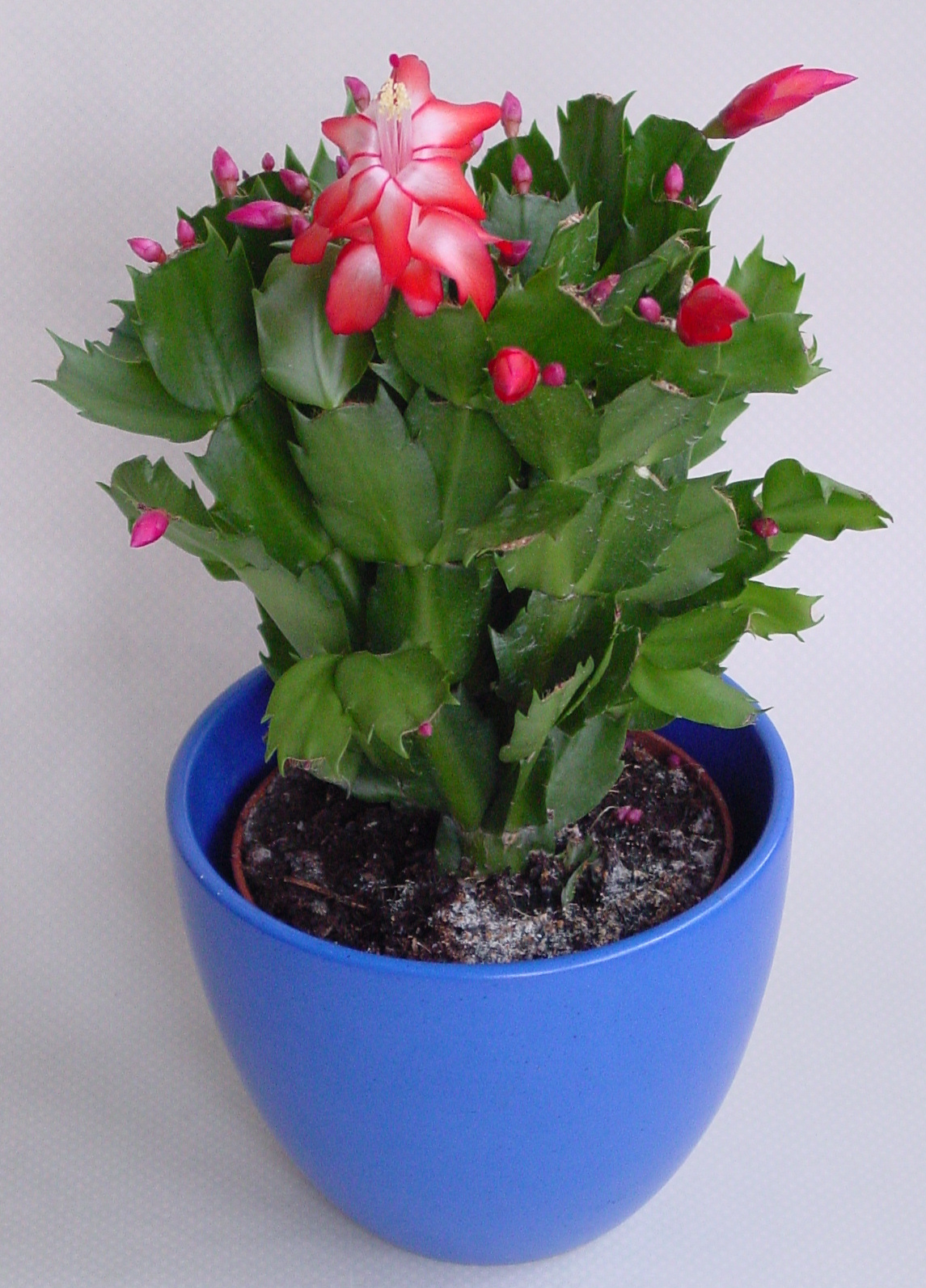
Young plant of a member of the S. Truncata Group; still upright and therefore more convenient for selling

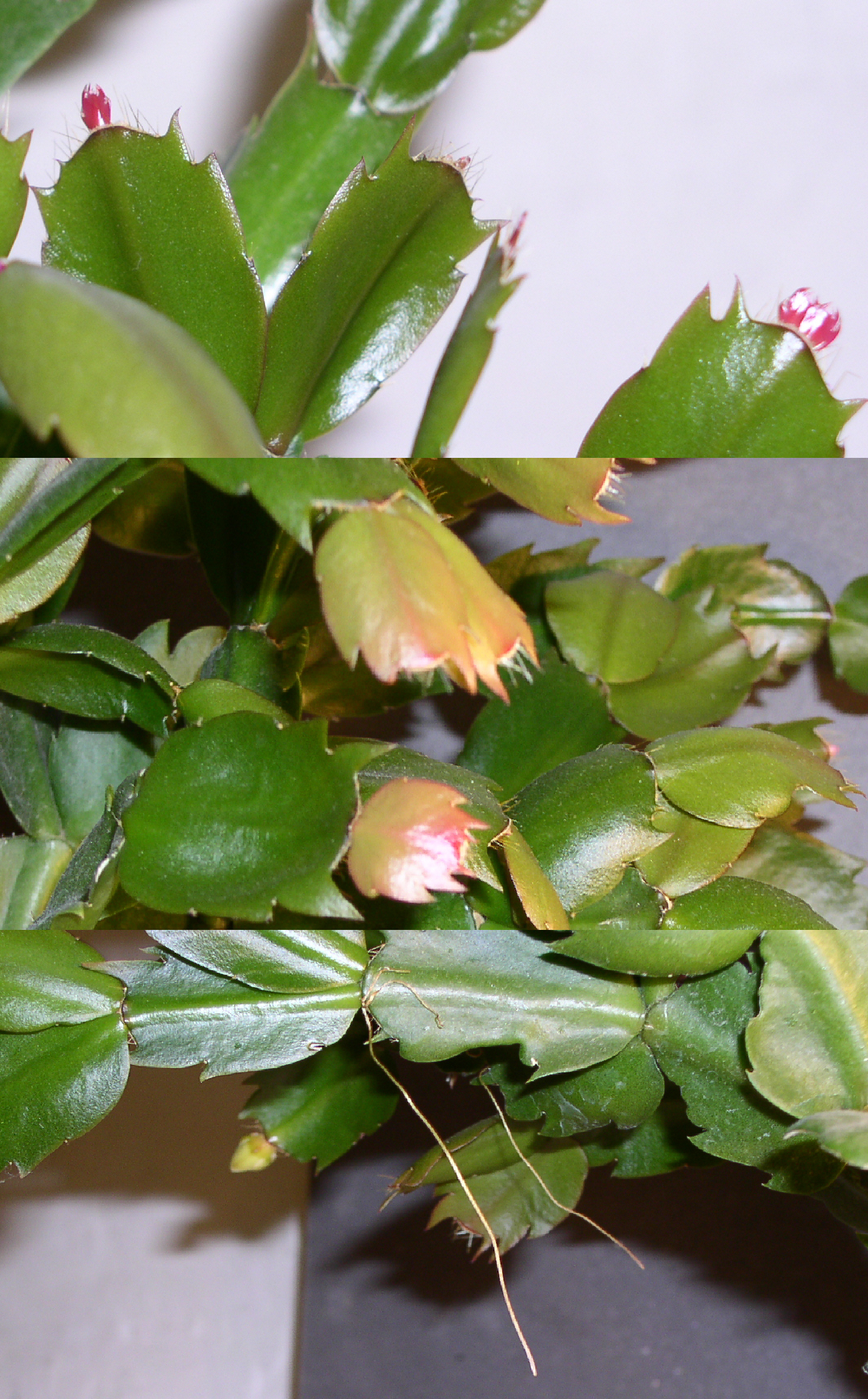
Schlumbergera new growth. The upper view shows bright red new cladodes forming, the centre shows maturing growth, the lower view shows two aerial roots extending down

Inflorescence.

=== Pests and diseases ===
In cultivation, these plants have been described as "remarkably free from pests and diseases". Two significant insect pests are aphids on young shoots, buds and flowers, and root mealybugs which attack below soil level. Stems and roots can be rotted by diseases caused by fungi and similar organisms; these include infections by species of Fusarium (a fungus), and Phytophthora and Pythium (both water moulds). Approved chemical treatments can be used in the case of insect attack or these diseases.

Aphids, mealybugs and other invertebrate pests can spread viruses. Symptoms vary with the species, but a loss of vigour is usual. Cactus virus X has been isolated from S. truncata. There is no treatment for virus diseases; it is recommended that infected plants be destroyed.

== Bibliography ==
- Anderson, Edward F. (2001), The Cactus Family, Portland, Oregon: Timber Press, ISBN 978-0-88192-498-5
- McMillan, A. J. S.; Horobin, J. F. (1995), Christmas Cacti: The Genus Schlumbergera and Its Hybrids (p/b ed.), Sherbourne, Dorset, UK: David Hunt, ISBN 978-0-9517234-6-3
