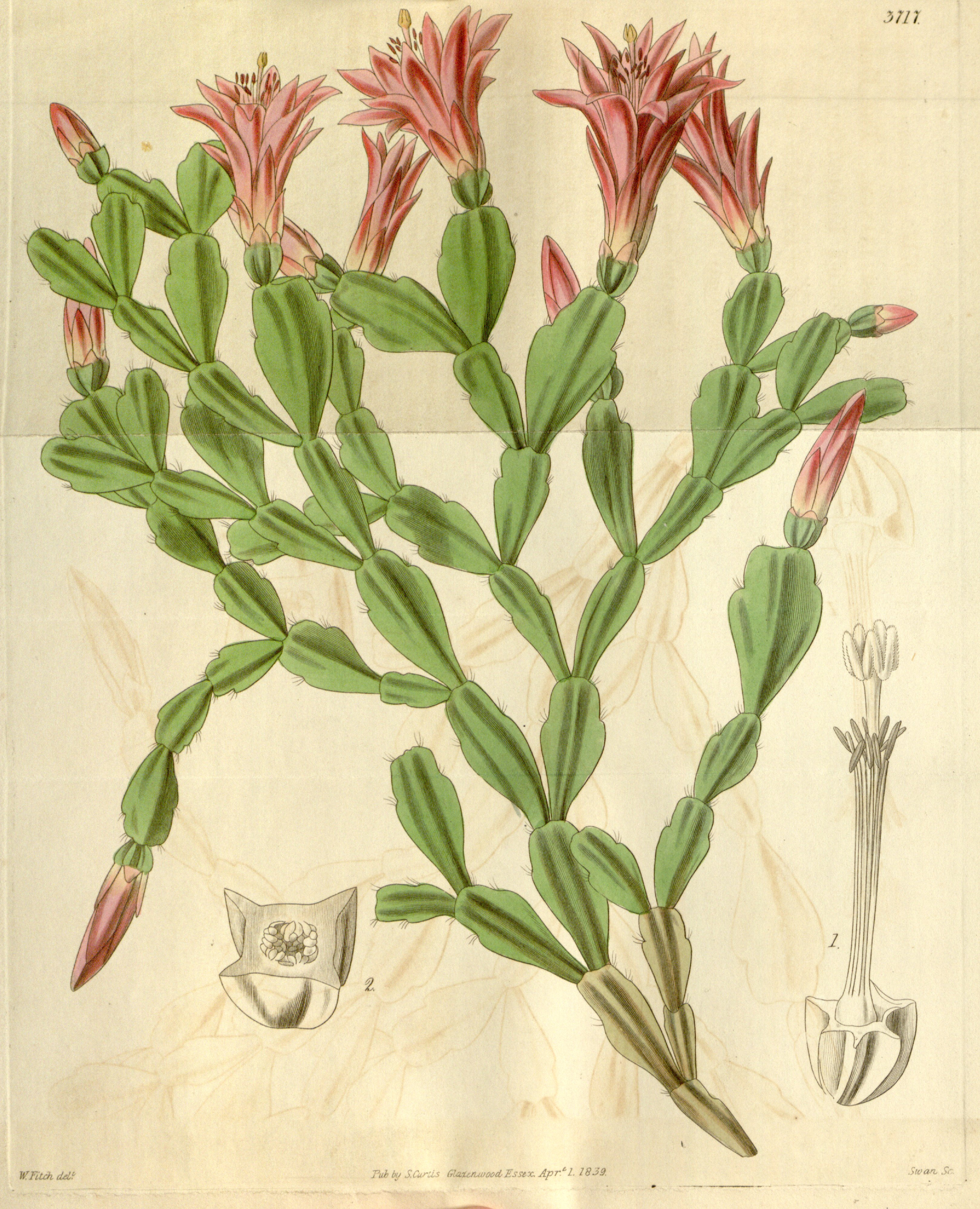

Conservation status
- Endangered (IUCN 3.1)

Scientific classification
- Kingdom: Plantae
- Clade: Embryophytes
- Clade: Tracheophytes
- Clade: Spermatophytes
- Clade: Angiosperms
- Clade: Eudicots
- Order: Caryophyllales
- Family: Cactaceae
- Subfamily: Cactoideae
- Genus: Schlumbergera
- Species: S. russelliana

Binomial name
- Schlumbergera russelliana (Hook.) Britton & Rose

Synonyms
- List: Cereus russellianus (Hook.) Gardner; Epiphyllum bridgesii Lem.; Epiphyllum russellianum Hook.; Epiphyllum russellianum var. rubrum T.Br.; Epiphyllum russellianum var. superbum T.Br.; Epiphyllum truncatum var. bridgesii (Lem.) T.Br.; Phyllocactus russellianus (Hook.) Salm-Dyck; Schlumbergera bridgesii (Lem.) Loefgr.; Schlumbergera epiphylloides Lem.; Zygocactus bridgesii (Lem.) Linding.

= Schlumbergera russelliana =

Species of cactus

Schlumbergera russelliana is a species of flowering plant in the family Cactaceae. It is endemic to a small area of the coastal mountains of southeastern Brazil, where its natural habitat is moist forest and it grows on trees as an epiphyte. It is one of the parent species from which many of the popular houseplants known as Christmas cactus or Thanksgiving cactus are descended.

== Description ==
Schlumbergera russelliana resembles other species of the genus Schlumbergera in that it has leafless green stems which act as photosynthetic organs. The stems (cladodes) are composed of strongly flattened segments, which have a small number of notches along their edges. Individual segments are about 1–3.8 cm (0.4–1.5 in) long by 0.8–2.0 cm (0.3–0.8 in) wide.

Special structures characteristic of cacti, called areoles, occur in the notches at the side of a segment and at the end. The areoles, with bristles up to 5 mm (0.2 in) long, are where the flower buds appear. The flowers hang downwards and are radially symmetrical (regular). They are about 5 cm (2.0 in) long by 3–4 cm (1.2–1.6 in) across. The tepals, which are of various shades of pink, are arranged in two groups, giving the appearance of a "flower within a flower". The inner tepals are longer and fused together at the base to form a floral tube about 3 cm (1.2 in) long; nectar is produced at the base of this tube. Plants flower in the spring; when cultivated in the Northern Hemisphere the flowering period is typically from February to April.

A characteristic of the genus Schlumbergera is that the many stamens are arranged in two series: the inner stamens form a ring around the style; the outer stamens arise from the floral tube. The stamens of S. russelliana are pale pink with pink pollen. The style has six to eight lobes at its end and is darker pink. The fruit is greenish-yellow, with four to five ribs. The shiny seeds are dark brown, each with a diameter of about 1 mm (0.04 in).

== Taxonomy ==
The species was first scientifically described in 1837 by George Gardner, whose patron was John Russell, 6th Duke of Bedford. It was first named in 1839 by W. J. Hooker as Epiphyllum russellianum; the epithet was Gardner's suggestion, to honour his patron. In 1858, Charles Lemaire created the genus Schlumbergera for this species – which is thus the type species of the genus – but changed the specific epithet to epiphylloides, which is not allowed under the current rules of botanical nomenclature; he should have called it Schlumbergera russelliana, which is its current name.

== Distribution and habitat ==
Schlumbergera russelliana occurs only in a small area of the coastal mountains of southeast Brazil, in the state of Rio de Janeiro, located in the southernmost part of the tropics. It has only been found in the Organ Mountains (Serra dos Órgãos) in the Parque Nacional da Serra dos Órgãos. Plants grow at altitudes of 1,400–2,100 metres (4,600–6,900 ft). Because of their altitude and proximity to the Atlantic Ocean, the coastal mountains have high humidity – warm moist air is forced upwards into higher, colder locations where it condenses. S. russelliana usually grows on other plants such as trees, making it epiphytic.

== Cultivation ==
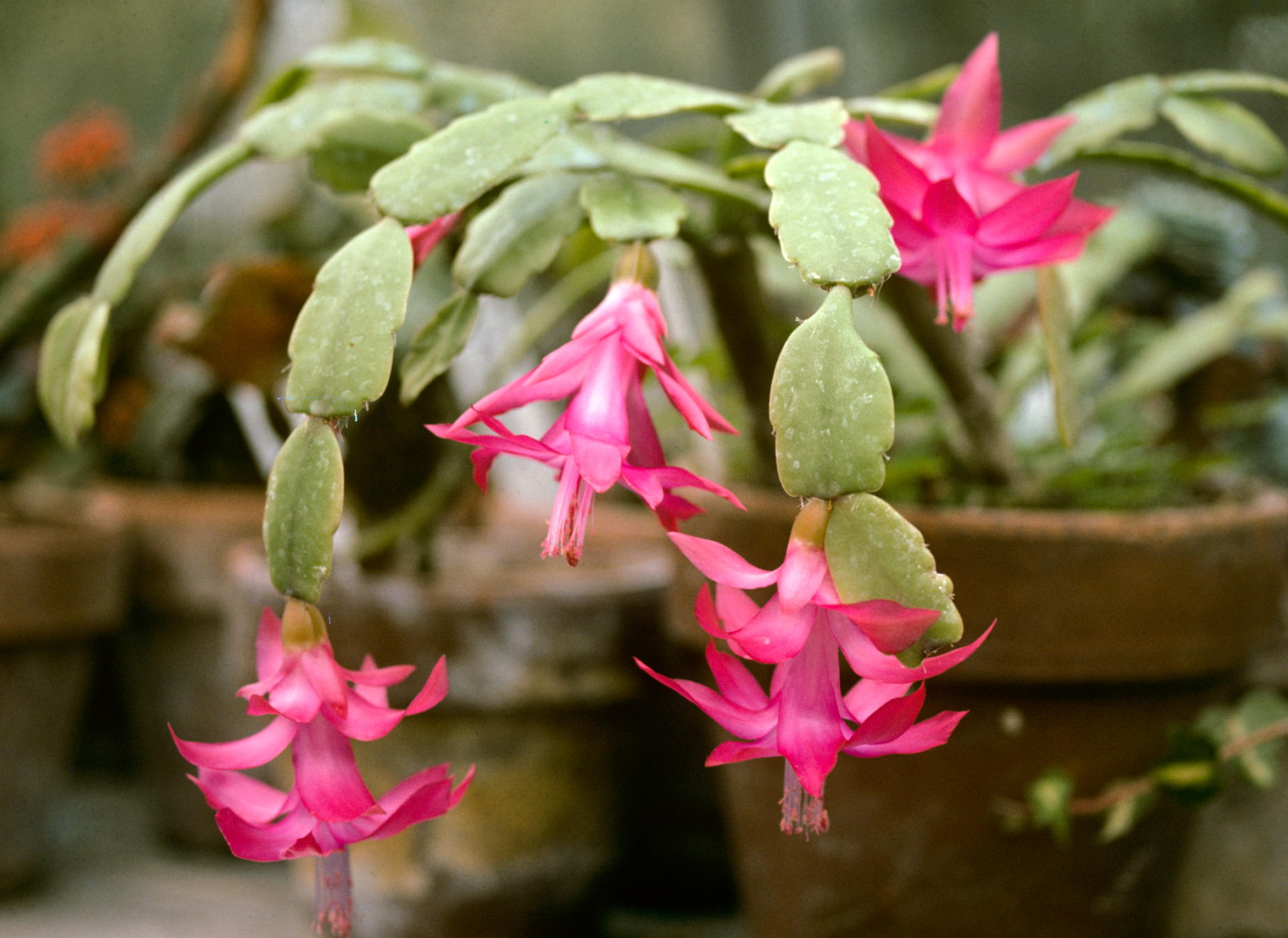
Cultivar in the S. Buckleyi Group

Schlumbergera russelliana is mainly cultivated in the form of its hybrids with other species of the genus, particularly the hybrid S. russelliana × S. truncata, which has been called S. × buckleyi (T.Moore) Tjaden or S. Buckleyi Group. The hybrid S. orssichiana × S. russelliana has also been domesticated; it has been given the name S. × eprica Süpplie. These plants and their cultivation are discussed at the page for the genus Schlumbergera.
