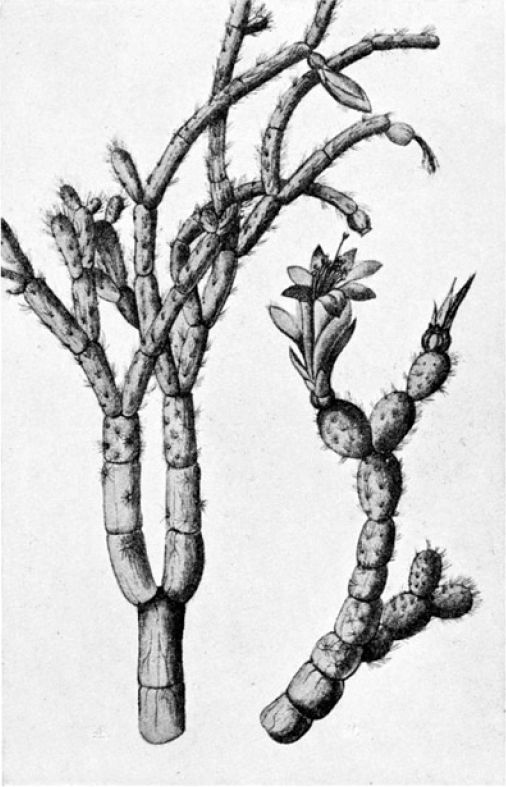
- Drawing by L. Cordeiro, originally published by Löfgren in 1918; the right-hand plant is the neotype for the species

Conservation status
- Vulnerable (IUCN 3.1)

Scientific classification
- Kingdom: Plantae
- Clade: Tracheophytes
- Clade: Angiosperms
- Clade: Eudicots
- Order: Caryophyllales
- Family: Cactaceae
- Subfamily: Cactoideae
- Genus: Schlumbergera
- Species: S. microsphaerica

Binomial name
- Schlumbergera microsphaerica (K.Schum.) Hoevel

= Schlumbergera microsphaerica =

Species of cactus

Schlumbergera microsphaerica is a species of plant in the family Cactaceae. It is endemic to a limited area of the coastal mountains of south-eastern Brazil where its natural habitat is rocky areas above 2,600 m (8,500 ft). It is threatened by habitat loss. It is in the same genus as the popular house plant known as Christmas cactus or Thanksgiving cactus.

== Description ==
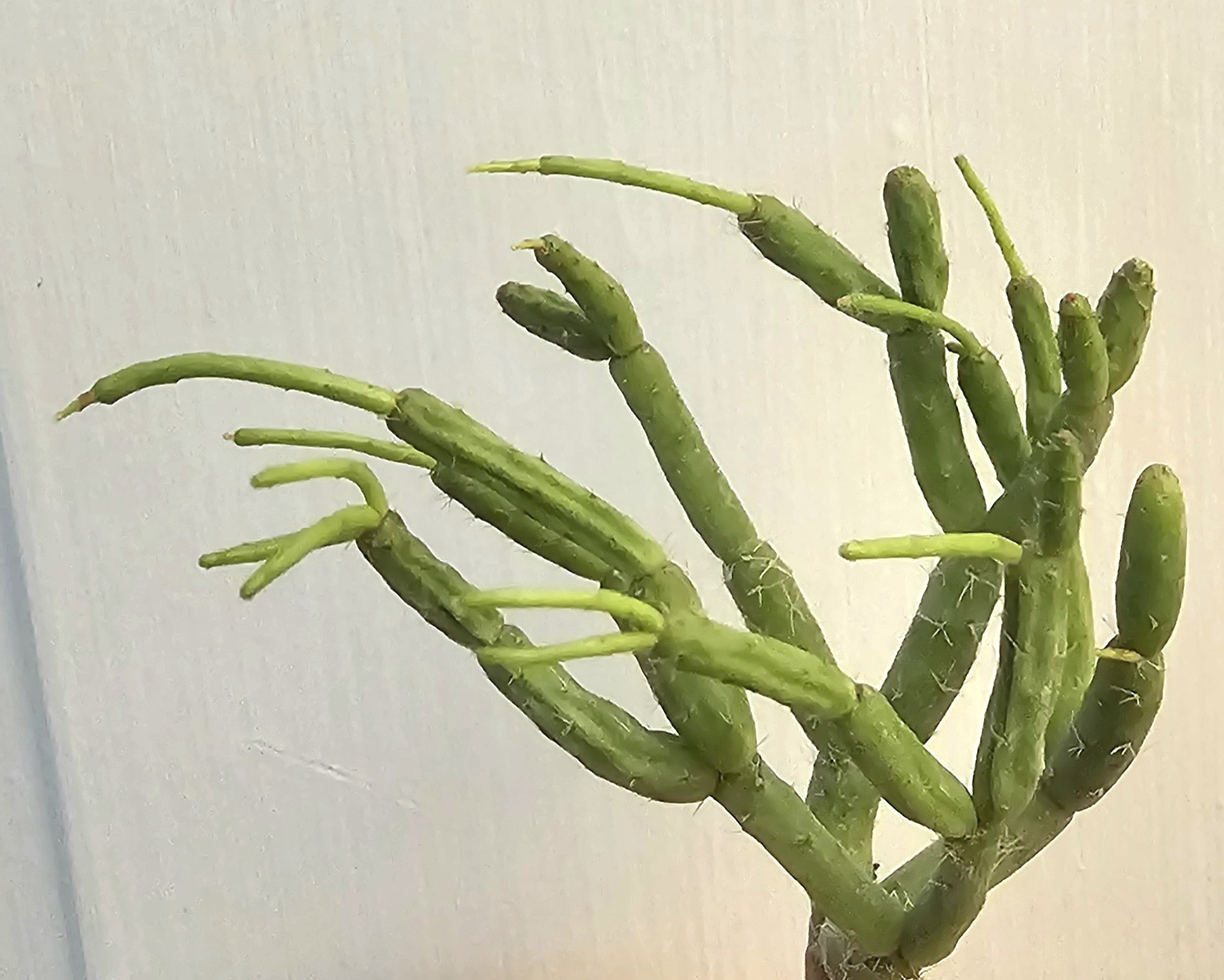
A small specimen of Schlumbergera microsphaerica, grafted onto different rootstock to promote growth, in cultivation as a houseplant.

Schlumbergera microsphaerica resembles other species of the genus Schlumbergera in that it has leafless green stems, made up of distinct segments, which act as photosynthetic organs. However, most other species have strongly flattened stems, whereas S. microsphaerica has branching stems made up of narrow, more or less cylinder-shaped segments, each 1.5–4.0 cm (0.6–1.6 in) long by 2–5 mm (0.1–0.2 in) in diameter.

Special structures characteristic of cacti, called "areoles", occur in a roughly spiral fashion over the stems. The areoles, which may have bristles, are where the flower buds appear. The flowers usually hang down and are more or less regular (radially symmetrical or actinomorphic). They are described as "fuchsia red" to white in colour and are about 1.5 cm (0.6 in) long. In cultivation in the Northern Hemisphere, plants flower in the spring – March to April.

The fruit is green, with up to five not very prominent ribs. The brown seeds have a diameter of about 1 mm (0.04 in).

== Taxonomy ==
The epithet microsphaerica is derived from the Greek mikros meaning small and sphairikos meaning spherical. The stem segments of the species are shaped like small cylinders or spheres.

Like the taxonomy of the genus (see Schlumbergera: Taxonomy), the taxonomy of Schlumbergera microsphaerica is complicated. The first person to name the species was Schumann in an 1890 paper in which he described three species: Cereus microsphaericus, C. obtusangulus and C. parvulus. However, he seems to have decided afterwards that the three species were not distinct, and in a monograph published later, which included an illustration, used only the name C. obtusangulus, although he did not actually say that the three species were the same. On this basis, some authors used C. obtusangulus as the basionym ("base name") when they later transferred the species to Epiphyllanthus (Berger in 1905), Zygocactus (Löfgren in 1918), Epiphyllum (Lindberg in 1926) and Schlumbergera (David Hunt in 1969). Other authors chose C. microsphaericus as the basionym, since this was the first name in the original paper, when they transferred the species to Epiphyllanthus (Britton & Rose in 1923), Arthrocereus (Berger in 1929) and Schlumbergera (Otto Hövel in 1970).

A further complication is that the original material on which Schumann had originally based his species was lost, so that whether C. microsphaericus and C. obtusangulus were in fact the same species or not cannot now be investigated. In 1991, Taylor formally united the two possible names by designating an illustration of what was at the time called Zygocactus obtusangulus (K.Schum.) Löfgren – the right hand drawing in the plate shown in the taxobox – as the neotype of C. microsphaericus (i.e. this illustration became the substitute for the missing specimen on which Schumann had based the name). Under the rules of botanical nomenclature, this means that microsphaericus rather than obtusangulus became the correct specific epithet.

Thus the synonyms of Schlumbergera microsphaerica (K.Schum.) Hoevel include:

Epiphyllanthus obtusangulus (K.Schum.) A.Berger
Zygocactus obtusangulus (K.Schum.) Loefgr.
Epiphyllum obtusangulum (K.Schum.) Lindberg ex Vaupel
Schlumbergera obtusangula (K.Schum.) D.R.Hunt
Epiphyllanthus microsphaericus (K.Schum.) Britton & Rose
Arthrocereus microsphaericus (K.Schum.) A.Berger

=== Subspecies ===
In 1918, Löfgren described a white-flowered species of what is now Schlumbergera under the name Zygocactus candidus. David Hunt does not consider this to be a distinct species from S. microsphaerica, treating it as S. microsphaerica subsp. candida (Loefgr.) D.R.Hunt.

== Distribution and habitat ==
Schlumbergera microsphaerica occurs only in a small region of the coastal mountains of south-east Brazil, in the states of Rio de Janeiro, Minas Gerais and Espírito Santo, (Note: The text at McMillan & Horobin 1995, p. 27 only lists the state of Rio de Janeiro, but two of the sites given are outside this state and the map at McMillan & Horobin 1995, p. 11 shows sites in all three states.) located in the southernmost part of the tropics. Sites where it has been found include Pico das Agulhas Negras in the Itatiaia National Park and the Pico do Cristal and the Pico da Bandeira in the Serra do Caparaó. Plants grow at altitudes of 2,600–2,780 metres (8,530–9,120 ft). Because of their altitude and proximity to the Atlantic Ocean, the coastal mountains have high humidity – warm moist air is forced upwards into higher, colder locations where it condenses. S. microsphaerica usually grows on rocks (epilithic) or on trees (epiphytic).

It is listed as threatened by loss of habitat in the IUCN Red List of Threatened Species, but placed in the category of "data deficient", meaning that there is insufficient information to determine its status further. Most plants are now in areas which are legally protected.
