= Albert Löfgren =

Johan Albert Constantin Löfgren
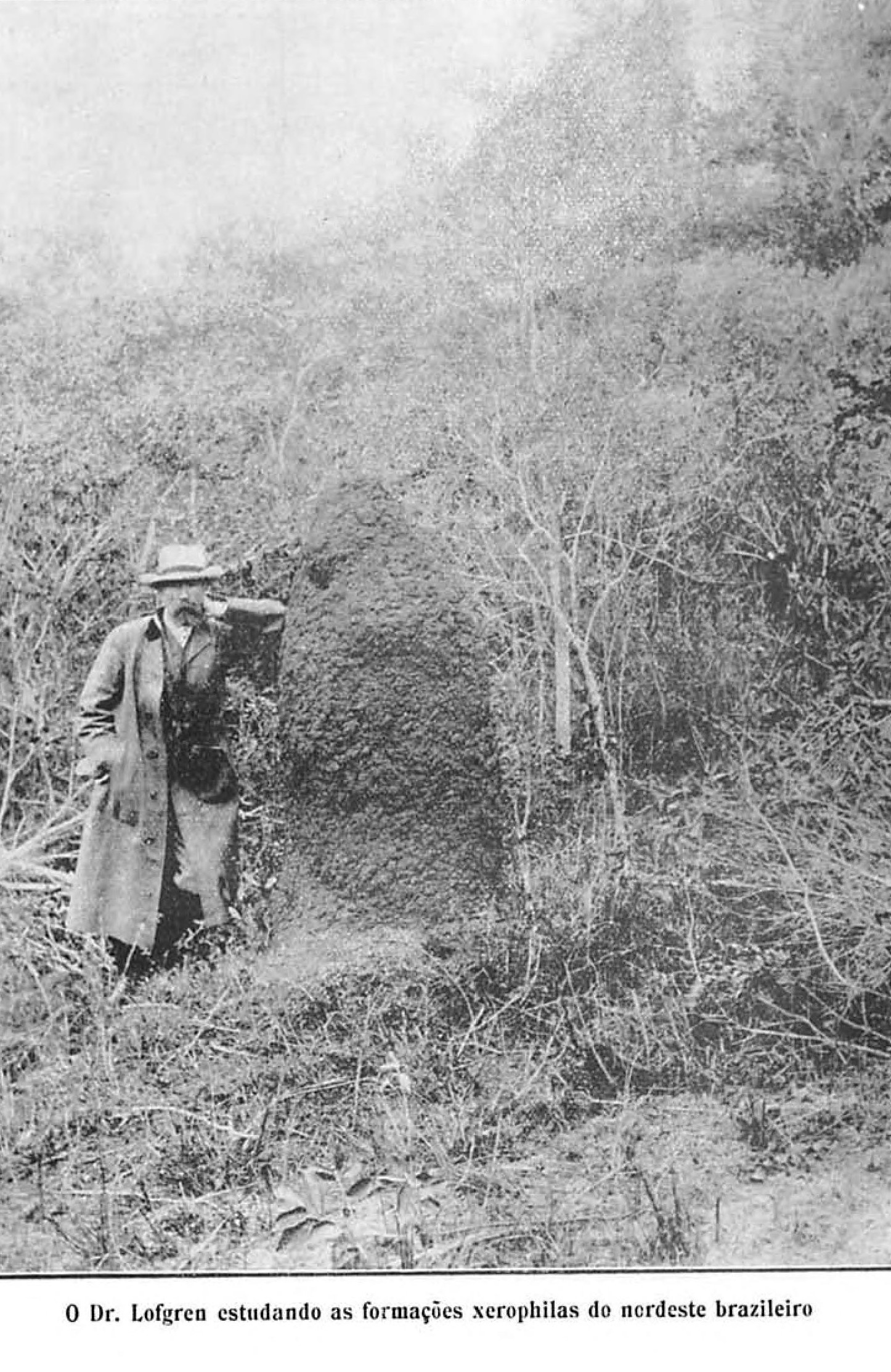
- Photo of Albert Löfgren
- Born: 11 September 1854; Stockholm, Sweden
- Died: 30 August 1918 (aged 63); Rio de Janeiro
- Citizenship: Brazilian
- Known for: Director of the Horto Florestal in São Paulo (1907-1909)
- Scientific career
- Fields: botany
- Doctoral students: Upsala College
- Author abbrev. (botany): Loefgr.

Johan Albert Constantin Löfgren (1854–1918), known as Albert Löfgren or Alberto Löfgren, was head of the botany department of the Rio de Janeiro Botanical Garden around 1905. The plant currently known as Schlumbergera opuntioides is one of those he first named.

Löfgren was the first director of the Horto Florestal de São Paulo, from 1907 to 1909, now named the Albert Löfgren State Park.

He is honoured in the naming of Loefgrenia, which is a monospecific, freshwater, epiphytic genus of nonheterocystic cyanobacteria known from Brazil, and the monotypic orchid genus of Loefgrenianthus from SE Brasil.
