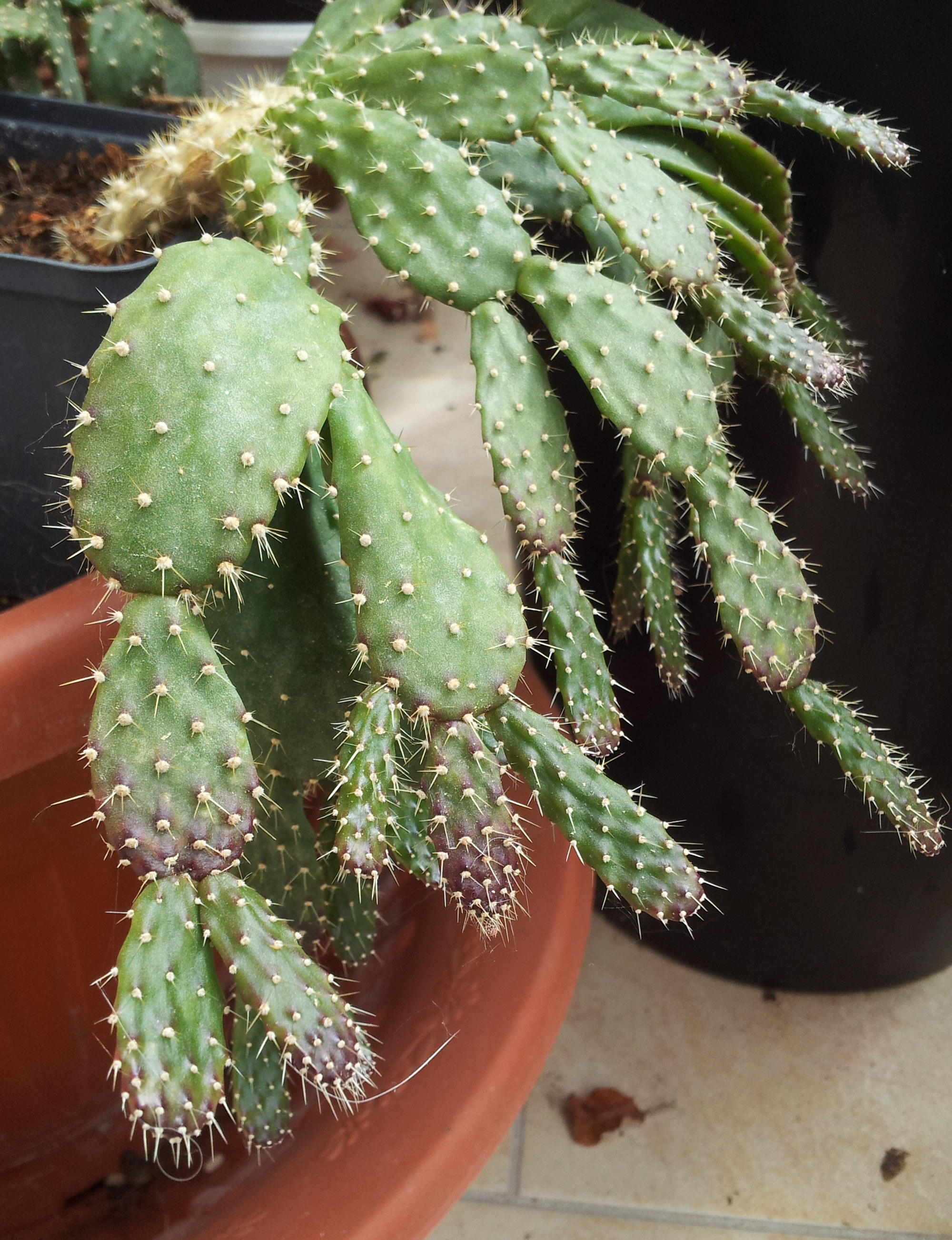

Conservation status
- Vulnerable (IUCN 3.1)

Scientific classification
- Kingdom: Plantae
- Clade: Tracheophytes
- Clade: Angiosperms
- Clade: Eudicots
- Order: Caryophyllales
- Family: Cactaceae
- Subfamily: Cactoideae
- Genus: Schlumbergera
- Species: S. opuntioides

Binomial name
- Schlumbergera opuntioides (Loefgr. & Dusén) D.R.Hunt

= Schlumbergera opuntioides =

Species of cactus

Schlumbergera opuntioides is a species of plant in the family Cactaceae. It is endemic to the coastal mountains of south-eastern Brazil where its natural habitats are humid forests and rocky areas. It is threatened by habitat loss. It is in the same genus as the popular house plant known as Christmas Cactus or Thanksgiving Cactus.

== Description ==
Schlumbergera opuntioides resembles other species of the genus Schlumbergera in that it has leafless green stems, made up of distinct segments, which act as photosynthetic organs. However, most other species have stems which are consistently strongly flattened, whereas in S. opuntioides, although young segments may be relatively flat, being 1.5–7.0 cm (0.6–2.8 in) long by 0.5–3.0 cm (0.2–1.2 in) wide, but only up to 9 mm (0.4 in) thick, the segments become more cylinder-shaped as they age, as well as becoming more woody. The plant may form a shrub up to 1.2 m (4 ft) tall.

Special structures characteristic of cacti, called "areoles", occur in a roughly spiral fashion on the segments; most young segments have many areoles but a few have only a small number. The areoles, which normally have bristles which become stiffer with age, are where the flower buds appear. The flowers are held so that they are more or less horizontal; the upper side is different from the lower side (bilaterally symmetrical or zygomorphic). They are pink to purple in colour and about 6 cm (2.4 in) long with a diameter of 4.5 cm (1.8 in). The inner petals are fused at the base to form a "floral tube", which is white. In cultivation in the Northern Hemisphere, plants flower in the spring – March to April.

The fruit is green, more or less spherical with four to five ribs. The brown to black seeds are about 1.75 mm (0.07 in) long.

== Taxonomy ==
The specific epithet opuntioides means "like Opuntia", referring to the appearance of the stems.

The species was first described by in 1897 by Engelmann, but given only a provisional name, Epiphyllum obovatum. This was taken up by Britton and Rose in 1923, when they transferred the species to Epiphyllanthus. However the species was not named properly according to the rules of botanical nomenclature until Löfgren and Dusén did so in 1905, creating the name Epiphyllum opuntioides. As with many other species of the genus (see Schlumbergera: Taxonomy), other generic names were used afterwards: Zygocactus (Löfgren in 1918), Epiphyllanthus (Moran in 1953) and finally Schlumbergera (David Hunt in 1969).

Thus the synonyms of S. opuntioides (Loefgr. & Dusén) D.R.Hunt include:

Epiphyllum obovatum Engelm. ex K.Schum., nom. prov.
Epiphyllanthus obovatus (Engelm. ex K.Schum.) Britton & Rose
Epiphyllum opuntioides Loefgr. & Dusén
Zygocactus opuntioides (Loefgr. & Dusén) Loefgr.
Epiphyllanthus opuntioides (Loefgr. & Dusén) Moran

== Distribution and habitat ==
Schlumbergera opuntioides occurs only in the coastal mountains of south-east Brazil, in the states of São Paulo, Rio de Janeiro, and Minas Gerais, in the southernmost part of the tropics. Sites where it has been found include Mount Itatiaia in the Itatiaia National Park, the Serra da Mantiqueira in São Paulo, and the Serra do Ibitipoca in southern Minas Gerais. Plants are said to grow at altitudes of around 1,700 metres (5,600 ft) and 2,400 metres (7,900 ft). Because of their altitude and proximity to the Atlantic Ocean, the coastal mountains have high humidity – warm moist air is forced upwards into higher, colder locations where it condenses. S. opuntioides grows on trees (epiphytic) or on rocks (epilithic).

It is listed in the category of "near threatened" due to loss of habitat in the IUCN Red List of Threatened Species.
