= Schlumbergera kautskyi =

Conservation status
- Endangered (IUCN 3.1)

Scientific classification
- Kingdom: Plantae
- Clade: Tracheophytes
- Clade: Angiosperms
- Clade: Eudicots
- Order: Caryophyllales
- Family: Cactaceae
- Subfamily: Cactoideae
- Genus: Schlumbergera
- Species: S. kautskyi

Binomial name
- Schlumbergera kautskyi (Horobin & McMillan) N.P.Taylor

Species of cactus

Schlumbergera kautskyi is a species of plant in the family Cactaceae. It is endemic to a small area of the coastal mountains of south-eastern Brazil where its natural habitat is rocky areas. It is threatened by habitat loss. It is in the same genus as the popular houseplant known as Christmas cactus or Thanksgiving cactus.

== Description ==
Schlumbergera kautskyi resembles other species of the genus Schlumbergera in that it has leafless green stems which act as photosynthetic organs. The stems (cladodes) are composed of strongly flattened segments, which have "teeth" of varying shapes along their edges and at the ends, which are "cut off" (truncated) rather than pointed. Individual segments, which are very variable, are usually 2.2–3.5 cm (0.9–1.4 in) long by 1.4–1.8 cm (0.6–0.7 in) wide (although lengths of up to 4 cm (1.6 in) and widths up to 2.5 cm (1.0 in) are known).

Special structures characteristic of cacti, called "areoles", occur at the end of the segments. The areoles, which have brown wool and short bristles, are where the flower buds appear. The flowers are usually held slightly above the horizontal with the higher side different from the lower side (zygomorphic, specifically bilaterally symmetrical). They are purple in colour, about 5 cm (2.0 in) long by 2.7 cm (1.1 in) across.

When ripe, the four-angled fruit is yellow-green with red tones, about 2.5 cm (1.0 in) long by 1.9 cm (0.7 in) wide, and contains about 150 dark brown or black seeds, each about with a diameter of about 1 mm (0.04 in).

== Taxonomy ==
S. kautskyi was the last species of the genus Schlumbergera to be given a scientific name. In 1991, Horobin and McMillan described it as a subspecies of S. truncata, S. truncata ssp. kautsky; in the same year N.P. Taylor raised it to a full species. The specific epithet relates to the collector whose surname was Kautsky. A 2011 molecular phylogenetic study confirmed its status as a full species within the genus.

== Distribution and habitat ==
S. kautskyi occurs only in a small area, estimated in 2002 to be less than 500 km^{2} (190 sq mi), of the coastal mountains of south-east Brazil, in the state of Espírito Santo, located in the southernmost part of the tropics. Sites where it has been found include Pico da Pedra Azul. Plants grow at altitudes of 900–1,300 metres (3,000–4,300 ft). Because of their height and proximity to the Atlantic Ocean, the coastal mountains produce high altitude moist forests – warm moist air is forced upwards into higher, colder locations where it condenses. Schlumbergera kautskyi grows either on rocks (epilithic) or more rarely on trees (epiphytic). It is listed as "endangered" in the IUCN Red List of Threatened Species in view of the limited area in which it occurs and the threat of residential development.
