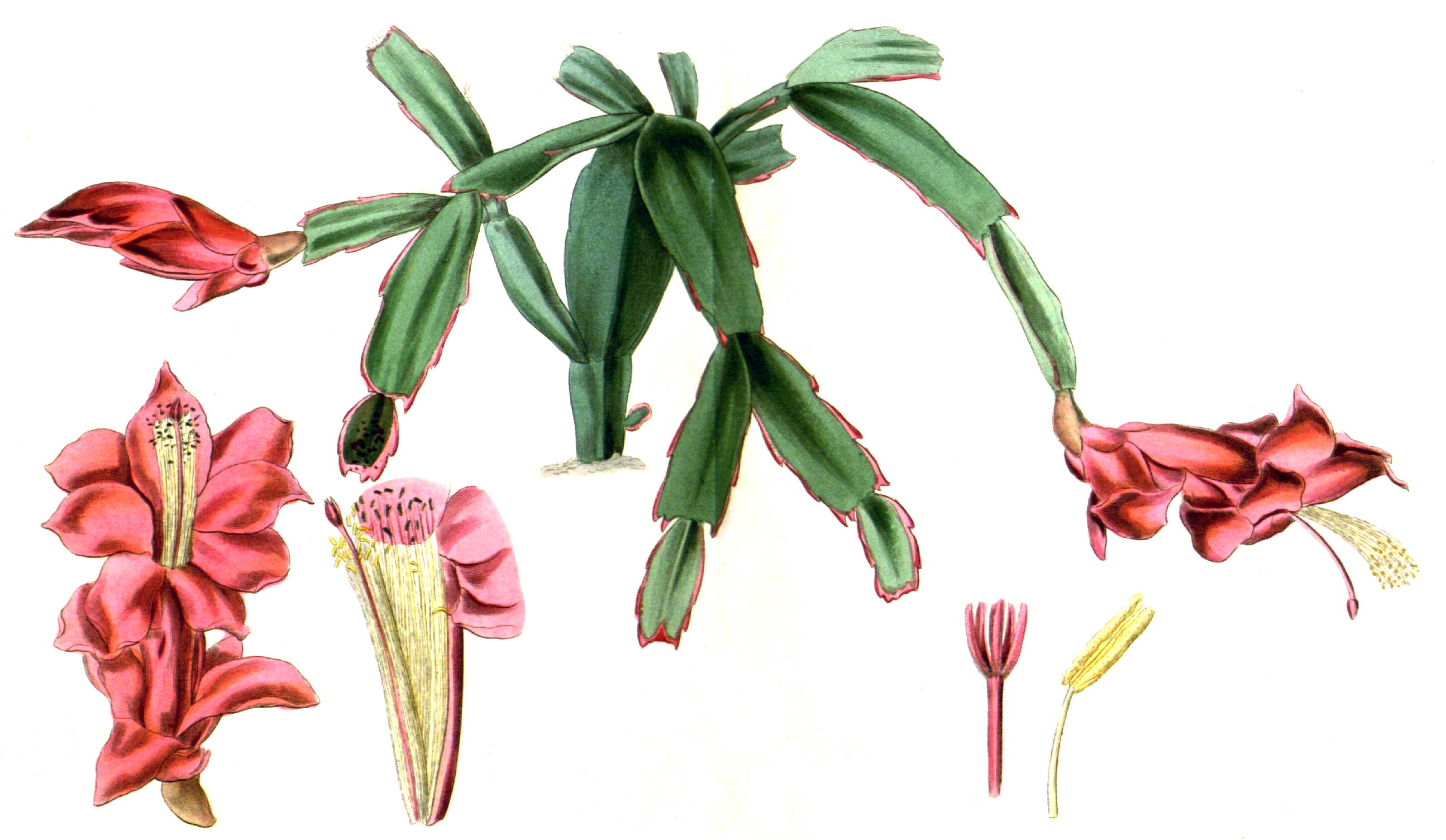
- Plate from Hooker's Exotic Flora

Conservation status
- Vulnerable (IUCN 3.1)

Scientific classification
- Kingdom: Plantae
- Clade: Tracheophytes
- Clade: Angiosperms
- Clade: Eudicots
- Order: Caryophyllales
- Family: Cactaceae
- Subfamily: Cactoideae
- Genus: Schlumbergera
- Species: S. truncata

Binomial name
- Schlumbergera truncata (Haw.) Moran

Synonyms
- List: Cactus truncatus (Haw.) Link; Cereus truncatus (Haw.) Sweet; Cereus truncatus var. altensteinii Salm-Dyck; Epiphyllum altensteinii Pfeiff.; Epiphyllum delicatum N.E.Br.; Epiphyllum elegans Cels ex C.F.Först.; Epiphyllum guedneyrii Houllet; Epiphyllum purpurascens Lem.; Epiphyllum ruckeri Paxton; Epiphyllum ruckerianum Lem.; Epiphyllum salmoneum Cels ex K.Schum.; Epiphyllum smithianum Marnock; Epiphyllum truncatum Haw.; Epiphyllum truncatum var. cruentum T.Br.; Epiphyllum truncatum var. magnificum T.Br.; Epiphyllum truncatum var. spectabile T.Br.; Epiphyllum truncatum var. wagneri Rol.-Goss. ex Guillaumin; Epiphyllum violaceum Cels ex C.F.Först.; Schlumbergera truncata var. altensteinii (Pfeiff.) Moran; Schlumbergera truncata var. delicata (N.E.Br.) Moran; Zygocactus altensteinii (Pfeiff.) K.Schum.; Zygocactus delicatus (N.E.Br.) Britton & Rose; Zygocactus truncatus (Haw.) K.Schum.

= Schlumbergera truncata =

Species of cactus

Schlumbergera truncata, the false Christmas cactus, is a species of plant in the family Cactaceae. It is endemic to a small area of the coastal mountains of south-eastern Brazil where its natural habitats are subtropical or tropical moist forests. It is the parent or one of the parents of the houseplants called Christmas cactus, Thanksgiving cactus or zygocactus, among other names.

== Description ==
Schlumbergera truncata resembles other species of the genus Schlumbergera in that it has leafless green stems which act as photosynthetic organs. The stems (cladodes) are composed of strongly flattened segments, which have two or three "teeth" of varying shapes along their edges and at the ends. The ends of the stems are "cut off" (truncated) rather than pointed. Individual segments are about 4–6 cm (1.6–2.4 in) long by 1.5–3.5 cm (0.6–1.4 in) wide at full maturity. Variation in size frequently depends on age of segment and access to sunlight and water.

Special structures characteristic of cacti, called "areoles", occur between two teeth at the end of segments. The areoles, which have brown wool and bristles up to 3 mm (0.1 in) long, are where the flower buds appear and additional segments grow. The flowers are held at a constant angle somewhat above the horizontal with the higher side different from the lower side (zygomorphic, specifically bilaterally symmetrical). The flowers are about 6.5–8 cm (2.6–3.1 in) long by 4–6 cm (1.6–2.4 in) across. There are six to eight tepals, which may be of various colours, including shades of red, orange, pink and white. The outer tepals (those at the base of the flower) are shorter and bent backwards, the inner tepals are longer and fused together at the base to form a floral tube; nectar is produced at the base of this tube. The lower inner petals are bent backwards so that the upper inner petals appear longer. Plants flower in the autumn: around May in their natural habitat, in October to November in cultivation in the Northern Hemisphere; short days and long nights are necessary to induce flowering. Due to its unique flowering schedule, these structures are significant for differentiating between different Cactaceae species as they affect characteristics like nectar production and function.

A characteristic of the genus Schlumbergera is that the many stamens are arranged in two series: the inner stamens form a ring around the style; the outer stamens arise from the floral tube. The filaments of the stamens are white, the anthers and pollen being yellow. The style has six to eight lobes at its end and is dark red. Additionally, Schlumbergera truncata specifically has unique reproductive characteristics from that of Schlumbergera as a whole which includes varied seed development, germination, and fruit production.

When ripe, the fruit is red, pear-shaped, and about 1.2 cm (0.5 in) long or exceptionally up to 2.3 cm (0.9 in) long. The shiny seeds are black, each with a diameter of about 1 mm (0.04 in).

== Taxonomy ==
The epithet truncata means "abruptly cut off", and refers to the shape of the ends of the stems.

The species was first properly named for science by Haworth in 1819 as Epiphyllum truncatum. His name was based on living specimens growing at the Royal Botanic Gardens, Kew in 1818. (However these do not appear to have been preserved, so an illustration published by W.J. Hooker in 1822 was designated as the "neotype" by N.P. Taylor.) Like others in the genus, the species was transferred to Zygocactus by Schumann in 1890, and then to Schlumbergera by Moran in 1953. Some other names in the genus Epiphyllum are now considered to be synonyms of S. truncata.

== Distribution and habitat ==
Schlumbergera truncata occurs only in a small area of the coastal mountains of south-east Brazil, in the state of Rio de Janeiro, located in the southernmost part of the tropics. Sites where it has been found include the Organ Mountains (Serra dos Órgãos) in the Parque Nacional da Serra dos Órgãos and in the Serra do Mar near to the city of Rio de Janeiro. Plants grow at altitudes of 700–1,000 metres (2,300–3,300 ft). Because of their altitude and proximity to the Atlantic Ocean, the coastal mountains have high humidity – warm moist air is forced upwards into higher, colder locations where it condenses. S. truncata usually grows on trees (epiphytic), or on rocks (epilythic). The native status of S. truncata has become confused because European cultivars were deliberately introduced into some areas, including the Parque Nacional da Serra dos Órgãos, by the Brazilian Agricultural Department, to compensate for over-collecting of wild plants. These climates are effective for Schlumbergera truncata due to its moisture content preferences. Humidity and moisture have significant affects on viability of pollen, thus shaping climate distribution for outdoor growth.

== Cultivation ==
Schlumbergera truncata is mainly grown as cultivars of the species or of its hybrids with other species of the genus, particularly S. russelliana. These plants and their cultivation are discussed at Schlumbergera: Cultivation. There are cultivation differences between Schlumbergera truncata and other Schlumbergera species largely because Schlumbergera truncata are the variety that grow outdoors rather than the houseplants which are grown and sold commercially. Some Schlumbergera truncata plants have self fertilizing abilities whereas the majority of Schlumbergera species are self-incompatible.
