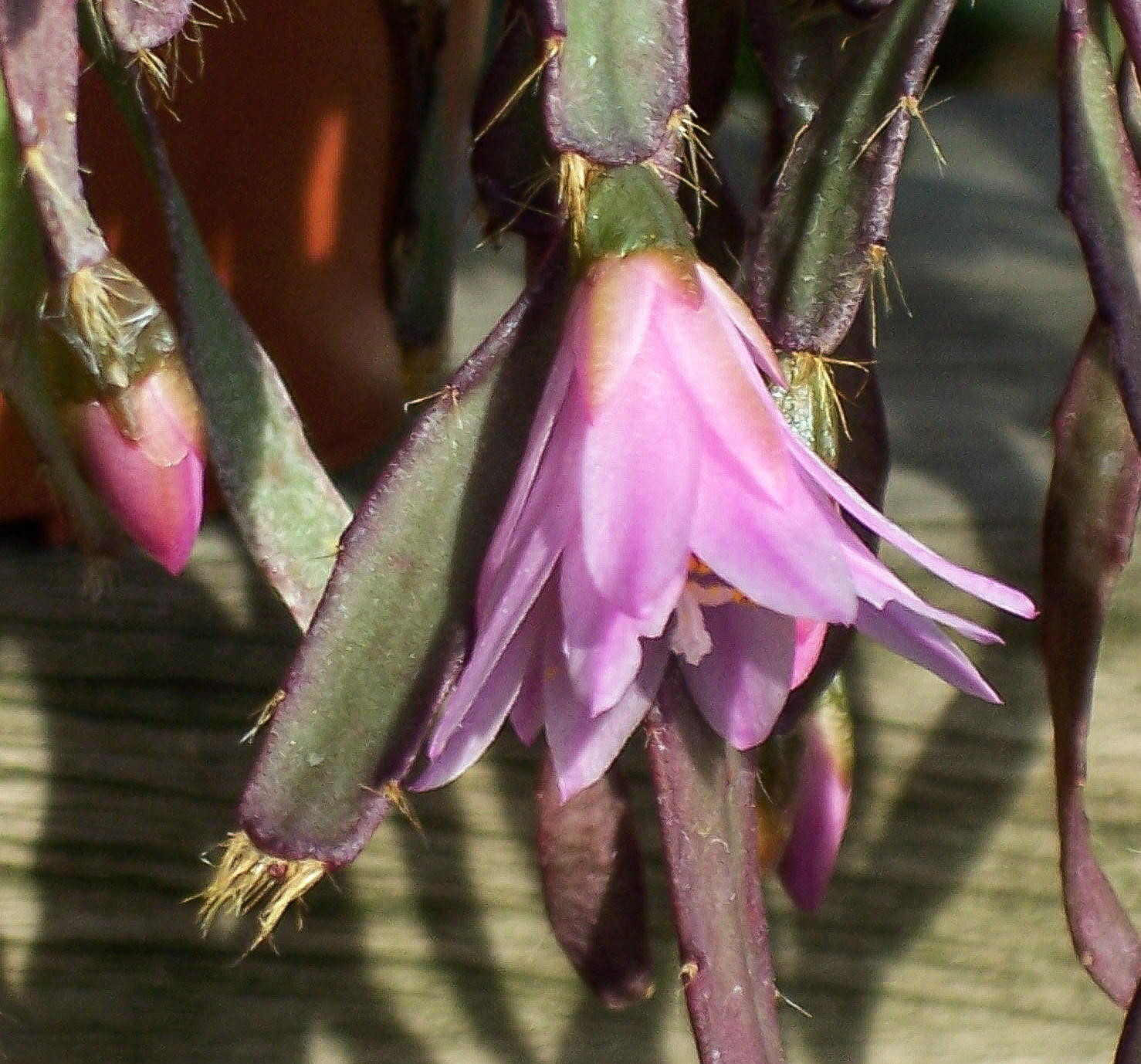
- In cultivation

Scientific classification
- Kingdom: Plantae
- Clade: Tracheophytes
- Clade: Angiosperms
- Clade: Eudicots
- Order: Caryophyllales
- Family: Cactaceae
- Subfamily: Cactoideae
- Genus: Rhipsalidopsis
- Species: R. rosea

Binomial name
- Rhipsalidopsis rosea (Lagerh.) Britton & Rose

Synonyms
- Hatiora rosea (Lagerh.) Barthlott; Rhipsalidopsis rosea (Lagerh.) Britton & Rose; Rhipsalis rosea Lagerh.; Schlumbergera rosea (Lagerh.) Calvente & Zappi

= Rhipsalidopsis rosea =

Species of plant

Rhipsalidopsis rosea, synonyms Hatiora rosea and Schlumbergera rosea, is a species of flowering plant in the family Cactaceae, native to south Brazil. It was first described, as Rhipsalis rosea, by Gustaf Lagerheim in 1912. It is one of the parents of the hybrid Rhipsalidopsis × graeseri, grown as the Easter or Whitsun cactus.

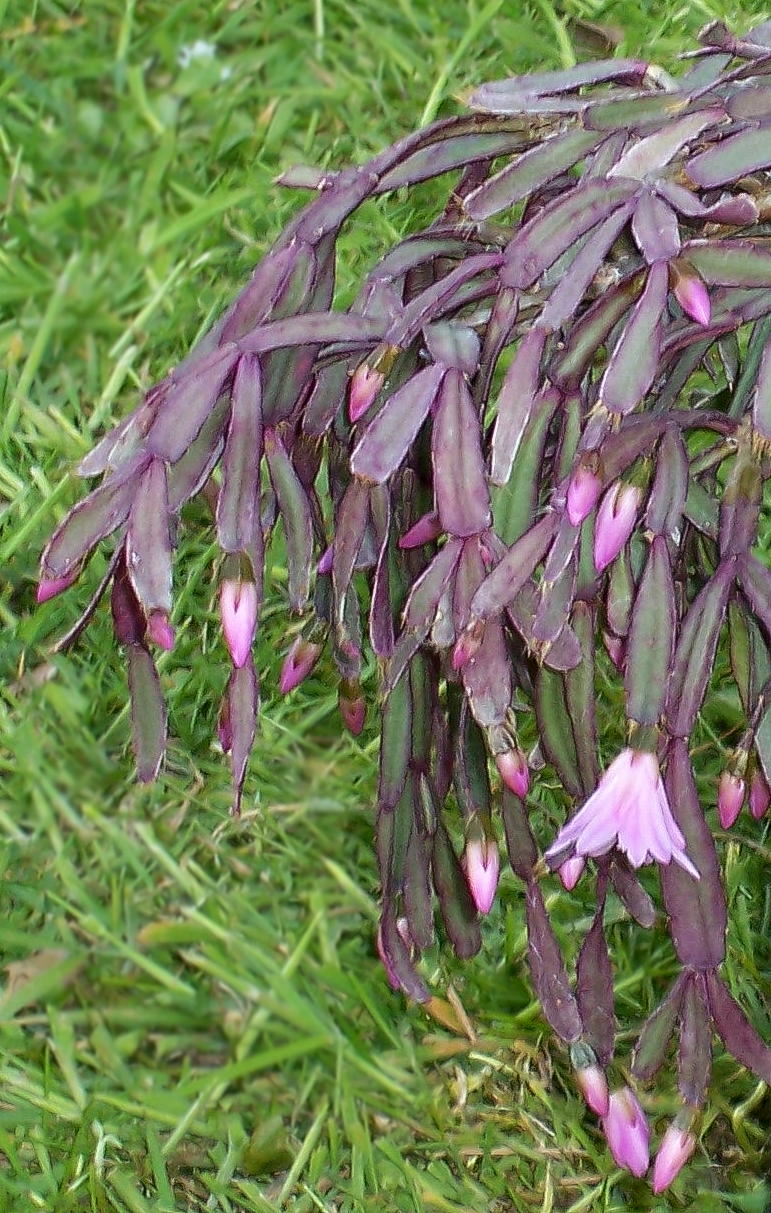
Habit (in cultivation)

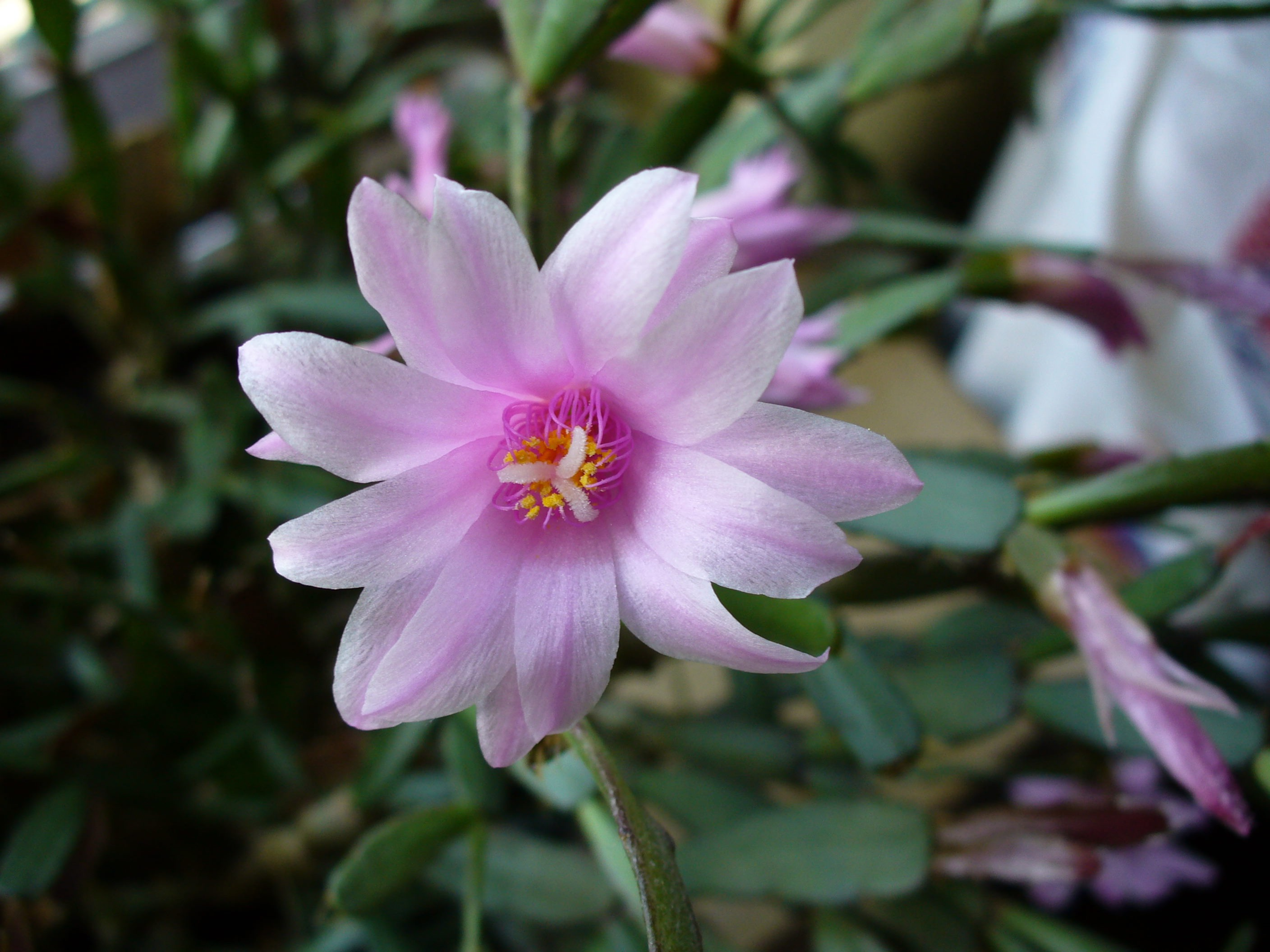
Flower from below (in cultivation)
