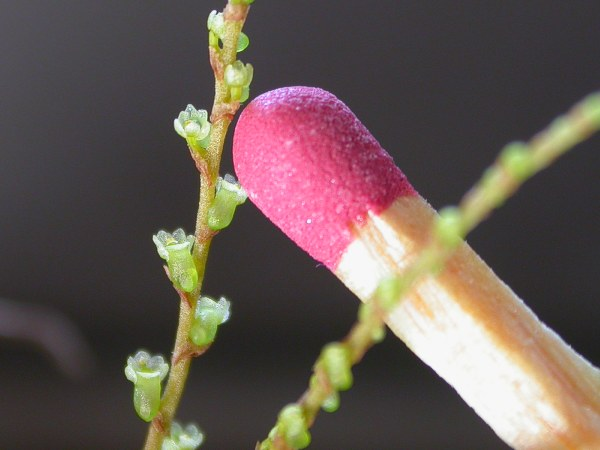

Scientific classification
- Kingdom: Plantae
- Clade: Tracheophytes
- Clade: Angiosperms
- Clade: Monocots
- Order: Asparagales
- Family: Orchidaceae
- Subfamily: Epidendroideae
- Genus: Campylocentrum
- Species: C. grisebachii

Binomial name
- Campylocentrum grisebachii Cogn. (1906)

Synonyms
- Campylocentrum chlororhizum Porsch (1905); Campylocentrum burchellii Cogn. (1906)

= Campylocentrum grisebachii =

Species of orchid

Campylocentrum grisebachii is a species of orchid. It is native to Bolivia, Brazil, Argentina and Paraguay.

== Description ==
This monopodial, epiphytic species of orchid has extremely reduced stems and leaves. The roots are the main photosynthetic organs of the plant. The velamen of the roots has 2-3 separate layers.
