= Angraecopsis parva =

Conservation status
- Vulnerable (IUCN 3.1)

Scientific classification
- Kingdom: Plantae
- Clade: Tracheophytes
- Clade: Angiosperms
- Clade: Monocots
- Order: Asparagales
- Family: Orchidaceae
- Subfamily: Epidendroideae
- Genus: Angraecopsis
- Species: A. parva

Binomial name
- Angraecopsis parva (P.J.Cribb) P.J.Cribb

Synonyms
- Holmesia parva P.J.Cribb

Species of plant

Angraecopsis parva (syn. Holmesia parva) is an orchid (family Orchidaceae) native to Tanzania and Malawi. It bears the second smallest flower of any orchid, not over 1 mm in width. Only Campylocentrum insulare is smaller.
