= Angraecopsis tridens =

Conservation status
- Near Threatened (IUCN 3.1)

Scientific classification
- Kingdom: Plantae
- Clade: Tracheophytes
- Clade: Angiosperms
- Clade: Monocots
- Order: Asparagales
- Family: Orchidaceae
- Subfamily: Epidendroideae
- Genus: Angraecopsis
- Species: A. tridens

Binomial name
- Angraecopsis tridens (Lindl.) Schltr.

Species of orchid

Angraecopsis tridens is a species of plant in the family Orchidaceae. It is found in Cameroon and Equatorial Guinea. Its natural habitats are subtropical or tropical moist lowland forests and subtropical or tropical moist montane forests. It is threatened by habitat loss.
