= Angraecopsis gracillima =

Conservation status
- CITES Appendix II

Scientific classification
- Kingdom: Plantae
- Clade: Tracheophytes
- Clade: Angiosperms
- Clade: Monocots
- Order: Asparagales
- Family: Orchidaceae
- Subfamily: Epidendroideae
- Genus: Angraecopsis
- Species: A. gracillima

Binomial name
- Angraecopsis gracillima (Rolfe) Summerh.

Synonyms
- Mystacidium gracillimum Rolfe

Species of orchid

Angraecopsis gracillima is an epiphytic species of plant in family Orchidaceae. It is found in Kenya, Uganda, and eastern Congo at altitudes from 4,000-7,000 feet above sea level. The flowers are white with a yellow center and have a 4 cm long green spur.
