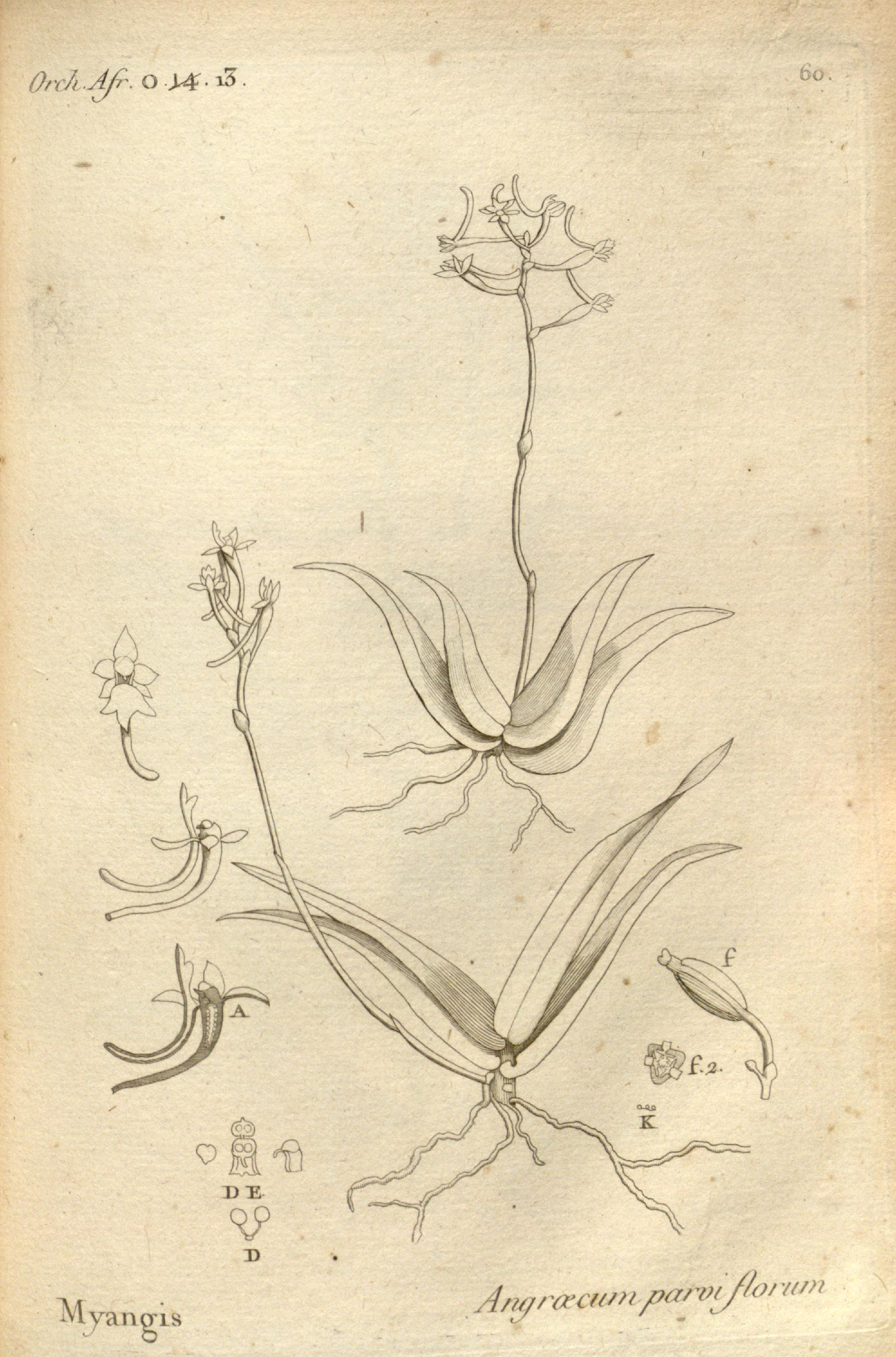

Scientific classification
- Kingdom: Plantae
- Clade: Tracheophytes
- Clade: Angiosperms
- Clade: Monocots
- Order: Asparagales
- Family: Orchidaceae
- Subfamily: Epidendroideae
- Tribe: Vandeae
- Subtribe: Angraecinae
- Genus: Angraecopsis; Kraenzl.

Type species
- Angraecopsis tenerrima Kranezl.

Synonyms
- Holmesia P.J.Cribb; Microholmesia P.J.Cribb in D.J.Mabberley; Coenadenium (Summerh.) Szlach.

= Angraecopsis =

Genus of flowering plants in the orchid family

Angraecopsis is a genus of plants in the family Orchidaceae. It was first described by Fritz Kraenzlin in 1900 and given its name on account with the genus' similarity to Angraecum species. Angraecopsis are native to Africa, Madagascar, Réunion, Mauritius and the Comoros. The growth habit is rather small and the leaves emerge from a woody stem.

== Species ==
- Angraecopsis amaniensis Summerh. - from Kenya to Zimbabwe and Mozambique
- Angraecopsis breviloba Summerh. - Kenya and Tanzania
- Angraecopsis cryptantha P.J.Cribb - Cameroon
- Angraecopsis dolabriformis (Rolfe) Schltr. - São Tomé
- Angraecopsis elliptica Summerh. - from Ivory Coast to Uganda
- Angraecopsis gassneri G.Will. - Zambia
- Angraecopsis gracillima (Rolfe) Summerh. - from Uganda to Zambia
- Angraecopsis hallei Szlach. & Olszewski - Gabon
- Angraecopsis holochila Summerh. -Uganda and Ethiopia
- Angraecopsis ischnopus (Schltr.) Schltr. - Bioko, Guiana, Ivory Coast, Nigeria, Sierra Leone, Cameroon
- Angraecopsis lisowskii Szlach. & Olszewski - Cameroon
- Angraecopsis lovettii P.J.Cribb - Tanzania
- Angraecopsis macrophylla Summerh. - Ivory Coast, Uganda, Ethiopia
- Angraecopsis malawiensis P.J.Cribb in I.F.la Croix - Malawi and Tanzania
- Angraecopsis parva (P.J.Cribb) P.J.Cribb - Malawi and Tanzania
- Angraecopsis parviflora (Thouars) Schltr. - Ivory Coast, Cameroon, Tanzania, Malawi, Mozambique, Zimbabwe, Madagascar, Mauritius, Réunion
- Angraecopsis pobeguinii (Finet) H.Perrier - Njazidja
- Angraecopsis pusilla Summerh. - Zaire (Congo-Kinshasa, Democratic Republic of the Congo)
- Angraecopsis tenerrima Kraenzl. - Tanzania
- Angraecopsis thomensis Stévart & P.J.Cribb - - São Tomé
- Angraecopsis tridens (Lindl.) Schltr. - Bioko, Equatorial Guinea, Cameroon
- Angraecopsis trifurca (Rchb.f.) Schltr. - Ethiopia, Zimbabwe, Comoros
