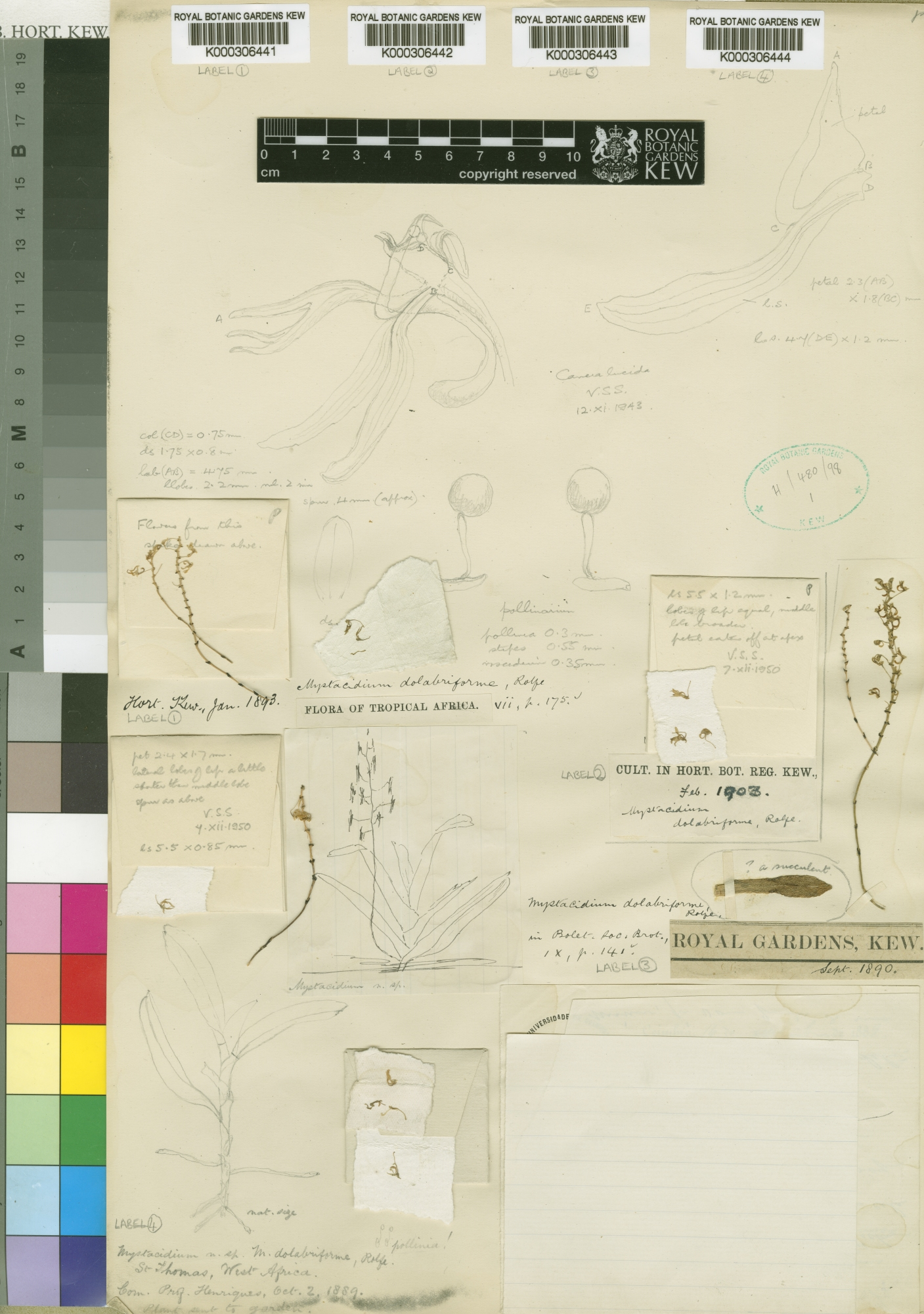
- Herbarium sheet of the only known specimen

Conservation status
- Extinct (IUCN 3.1)

Scientific classification
- Kingdom: Plantae
- Clade: Tracheophytes
- Clade: Angiosperms
- Clade: Monocots
- Order: Asparagales
- Family: Orchidaceae
- Subfamily: Epidendroideae
- Genus: Angraecopsis
- Species: †A. dolabriformis

Binomial name
- †Angraecopsis dolabriformis (Rolfe) Schlechter

= Angraecopsis dolabriformis =

Extinct species of orchid

Angraecopsis dolabriformis is an extinct species of plant in the family Orchidaceae. The sole known specimen was found in São Tomé. Its natural habitat has been destroyed by human activity since the 19th century and it was declared extinct in 2018.
