= Angraecopsis cryptantha =

Conservation status
- Vulnerable (IUCN 3.1)

Scientific classification
- Kingdom: Plantae
- Clade: Tracheophytes
- Clade: Angiosperms
- Clade: Monocots
- Order: Asparagales
- Family: Orchidaceae
- Subfamily: Epidendroideae
- Genus: Angraecopsis
- Species: A. cryptantha

Binomial name
- Angraecopsis cryptantha P.J.Cribb

Species of orchid

Angraecopsis cryptantha is a species of plant in the family Orchidaceae. It is endemic to Cameroon. Its natural habitat is subtropical or tropical dry forests.
