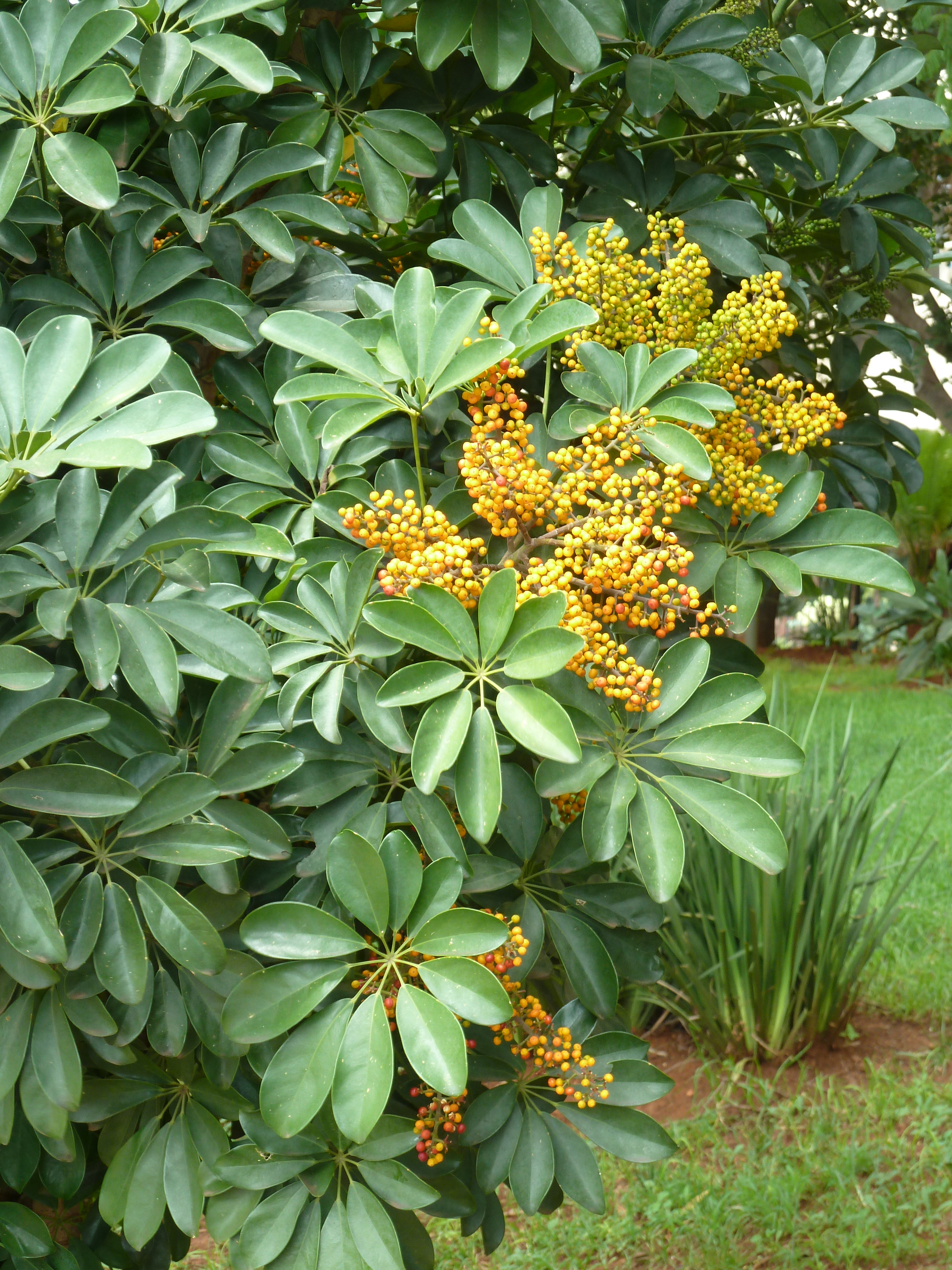

Scientific classification
- Kingdom: Plantae
- Clade: Tracheophytes
- Clade: Angiosperms
- Clade: Eudicots
- Clade: Asterids
- Order: Apiales
- Family: Araliaceae
- Genus: Heptapleurum
- Species: H. arboricola

Binomial name
- Heptapleurum arboricola Hayata

Synonyms
- Schefflera arboricolum

= Heptapleurum arboricola =

Species of flowering plant

Heptapleurum arboricola (syn. Schefflera arboricola, Chinese: 鹅掌藤; pinyin: ézhǎng téng; lit. 'goose-sole vine') is a flowering plant in the family Araliaceae, native to Hainan Province, China and Taiwan. Its common name is dwarf umbrella tree, as it resembles a smaller version of the umbrella tree, Heptapleurum actinophyllum.

== Description ==
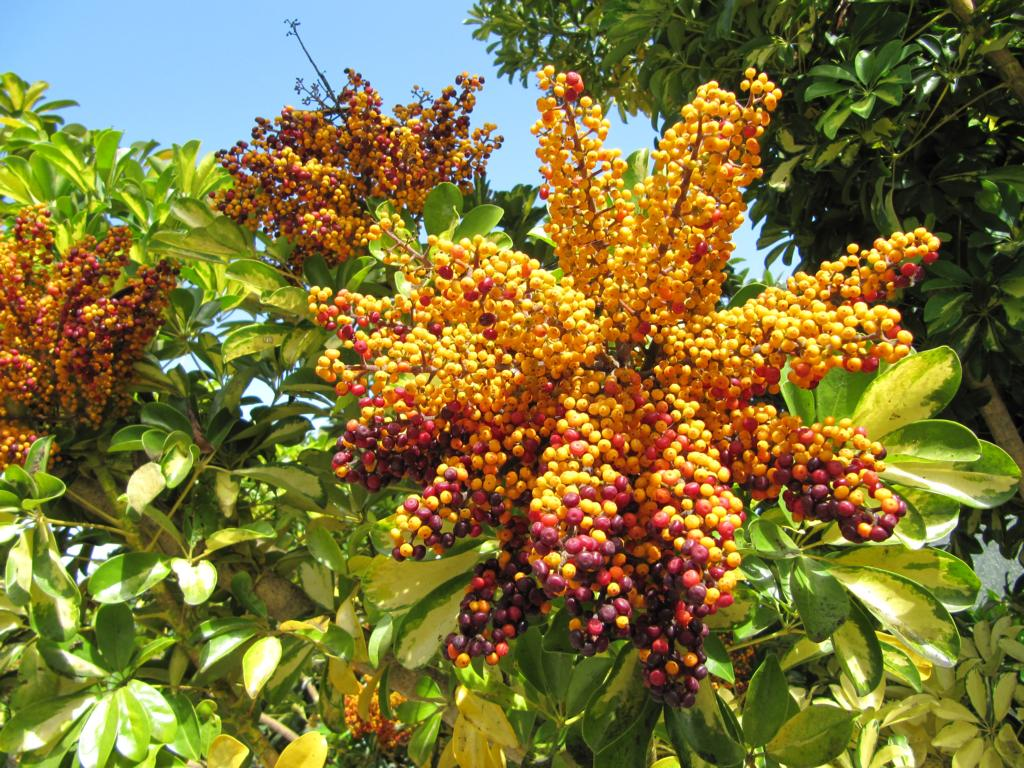
Fruits

It is an evergreen shrub growing to 8–9 m tall, free-standing, or clinging to the trunks of other trees as an epiphyte. The leaves are palmately compound, with 7–9 leaflets, the leaflets 9–20 cm long and 4–10 cm broad (though often smaller in cultivation) with a wedge-shaped base, entire margin, and an obtuse or acute apex, sometimes emarginate. The leaves are leathery in texture, shiny green, glabrous on the upper surface and somewhat lighter and matte on the underside. Young plants have smaller leaves and fewer leaflets. Each leaflet has a central rib that divides it into two halves, with between four and six ribs clearly visible up to the third order. The stipules merge with the petiole, the length of which is 12-15 cm.

=== Flowers ===
Appearing from midsummer to early autumn, the flowers are produced in a 20 cm panicle of small umbels, each umbel 7–10 mm in diameter with 5–10 flowers. The flowers are hermaphroditic, having a colour ranging from yellow to green and a double perianth radial symmetry. They are composed of an entire annular calyx, five almost fully developed sepals, a corolla with five petals 2.5 mm long, with five stamens and five or six carpels that enclose the ovary. The style is not recognizable and the stigma is established.

=== Fruits ===
The fruits have an almost spherical oval drupe, with a diameter of about 5 mm. The endocarp contains five seeds. The fruits ripen from late summer to early winter. They begin as orange glandular points. At maturity, they become red-violet. The fruits are inedible to humans, but may be consumed (and spread elsewhere) by various birds or other animals.

== Distribution ==
This species is indigenous to Taiwan and has been introduced to the Ryukyu Islands, Hawaii, Florida, Bermuda, and Jamaica.

== Cultivation and uses ==
Heptapleurum arboricola is commonly grown as a houseplant, popular for its tolerance of neglect and poor growing conditions. It is also grown as a landscape (garden) plant in milder climates where frosts are not severe. Numerous cultivars have been selected for variations in leaf colour and pattern, often variegated with creamy-white to yellow edges or centres, and dwarf forms. The cultivar 'Gold Capella' has gained the Royal Horticultural Society's Award of Garden Merit.

=== Care ===
The plant prefers bright indirect light, but can adapt to a wide variety of light levels. As a tropical plant, it prefers moisture and humidity, but soil should be well-drained and allowed to dry out between waterings. Allowing the plant to sit in water can cause root rot. The plant can be propagated through cuttings, which will develop roots when placed in soil or water.

=== Aerial roots ===
Under the right conditions, this plant will produce aerial roots that, when they reach the ground, will convert to fully functional roots. They give the plant an unusual and interesting appearance. Three conditions must be maintained for the plant to produce them: a high growth rate, insufficient trunk roots (the plant is root bound or these roots are pruned) and constant, very high humidity.

=== Toxicity ===
All parts of the plant contain calcium oxalate crystals, saponins and terpenoids, toxic compounds which are irritants for cats and dogs. They can cause swelling (in some cases leading to breathing difficulties), burning of the mouth, difficulty swallowing, vomiting, diarrhoea, and itching. For humans, the plant is low-severity poison and a skin irritant which can cause contact dermatitits.

== Photo gallery ==
A bonsai from New England.

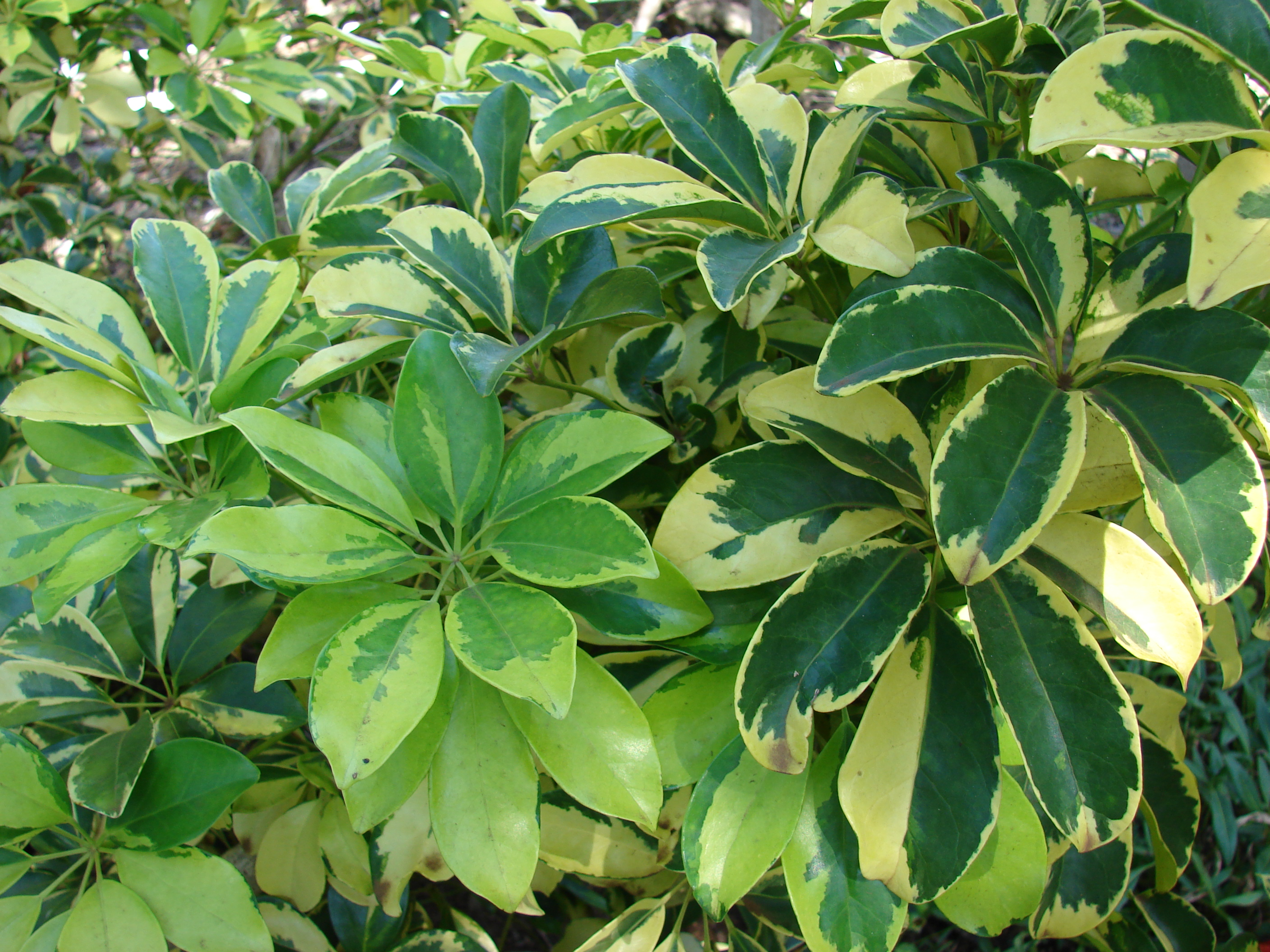
A variegated cultivar

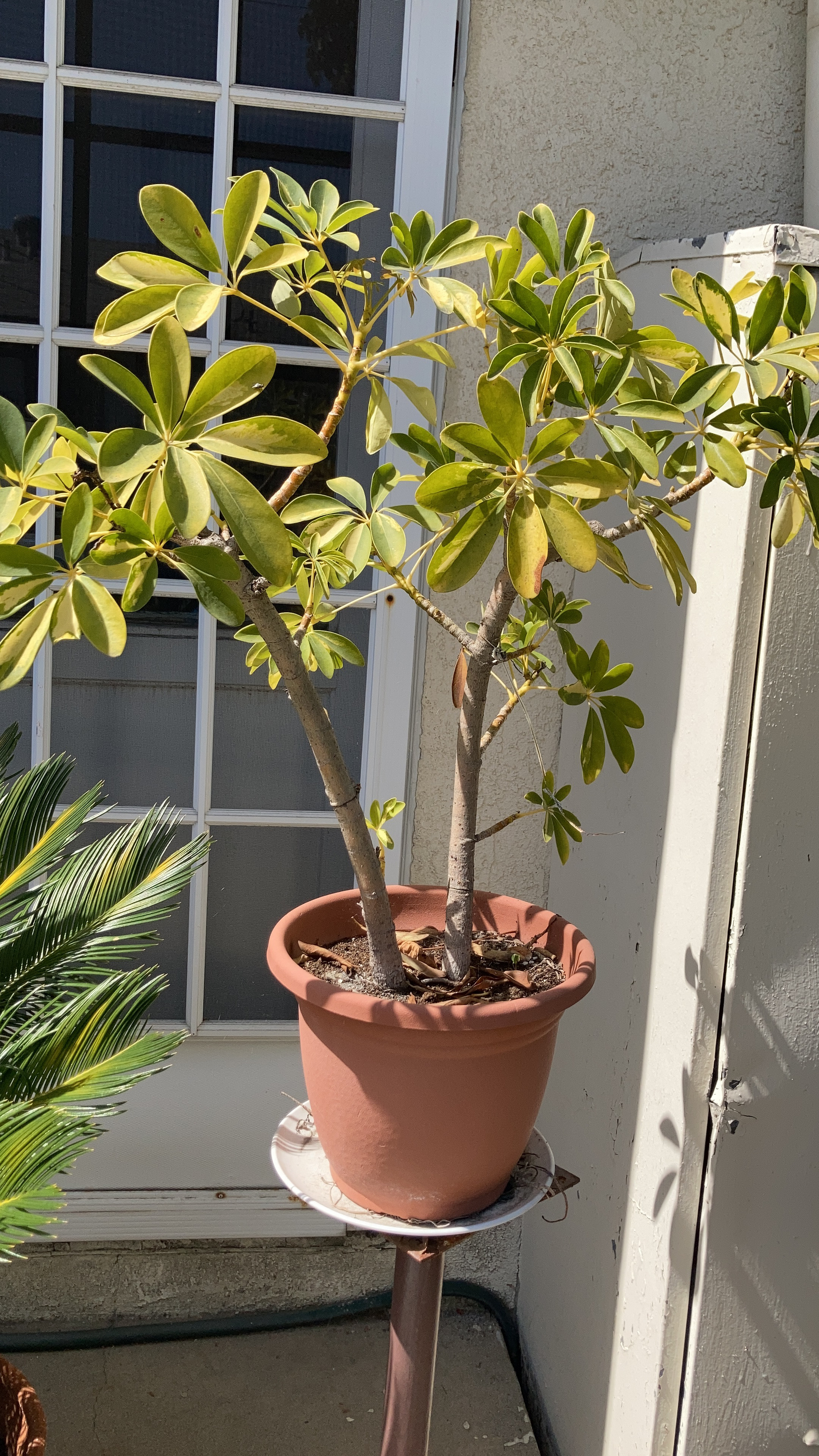
The 'Gold Capella' variety

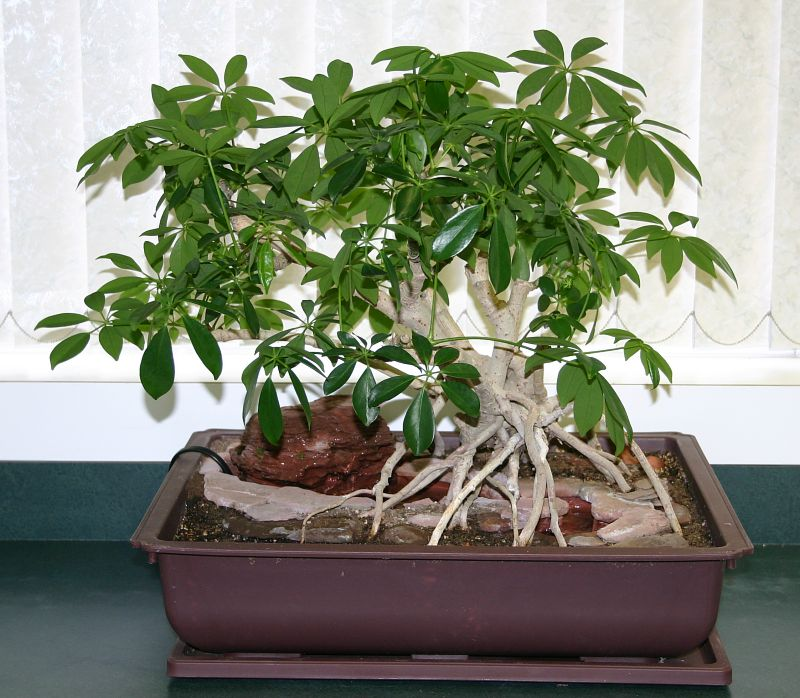
An old indoor bonsai presented as a penjing

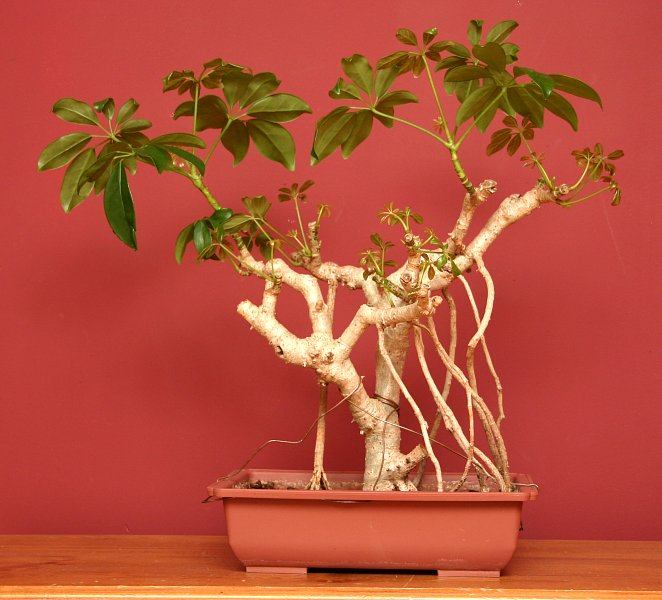
Soon after branch pruning, to demonstrate aerial roots

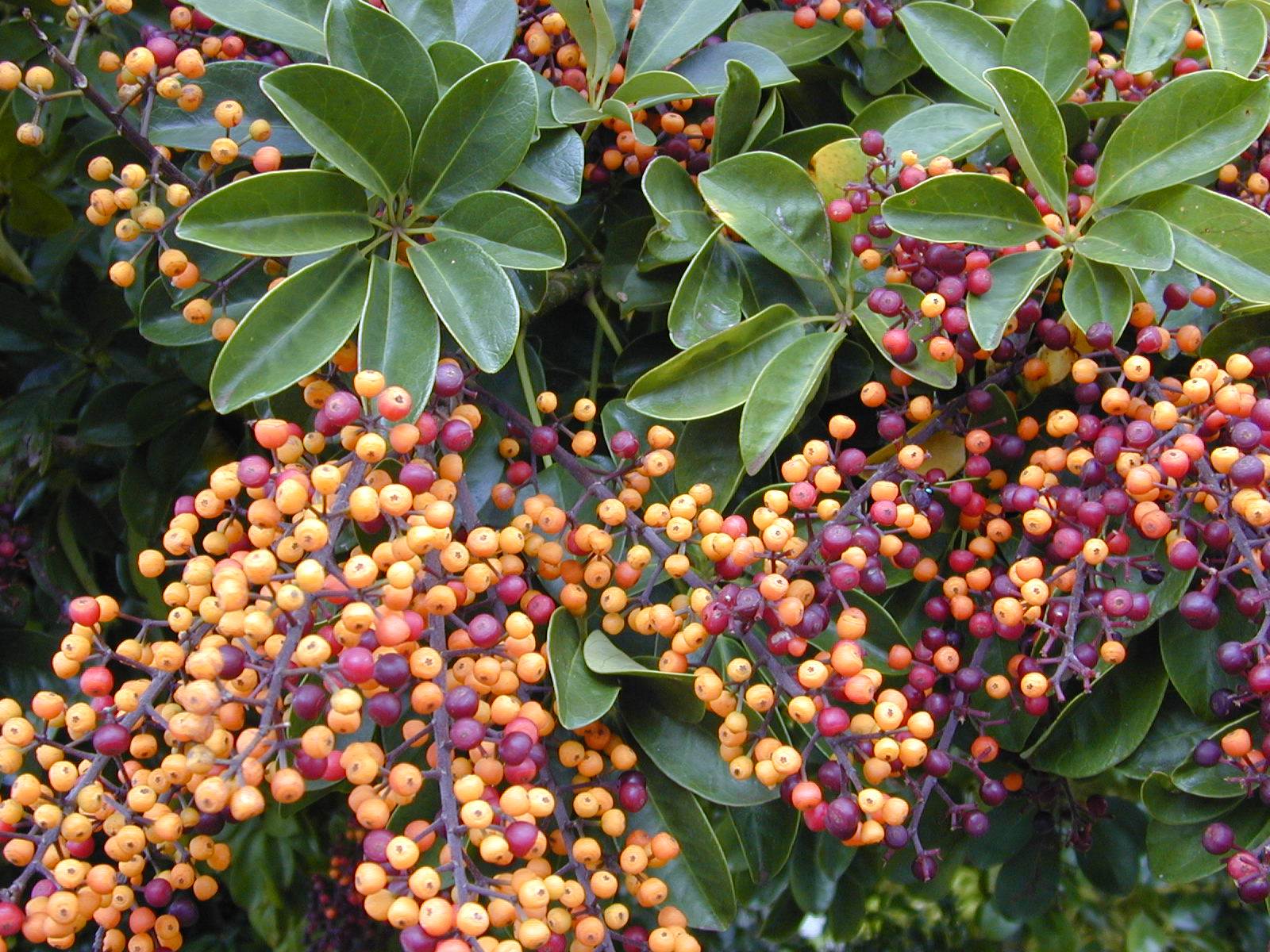
A garden plant with fruits in Maui

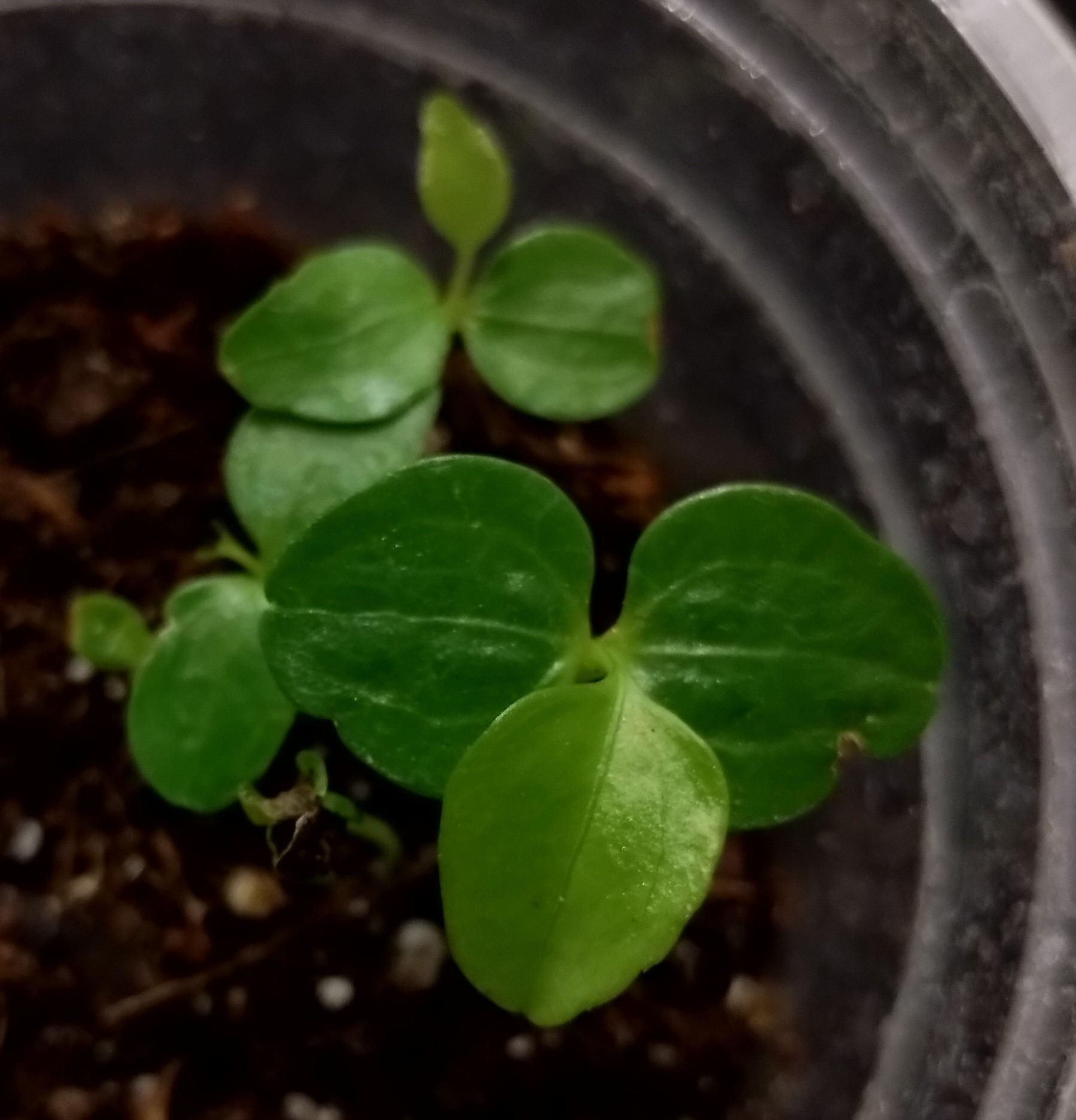
Seedlings

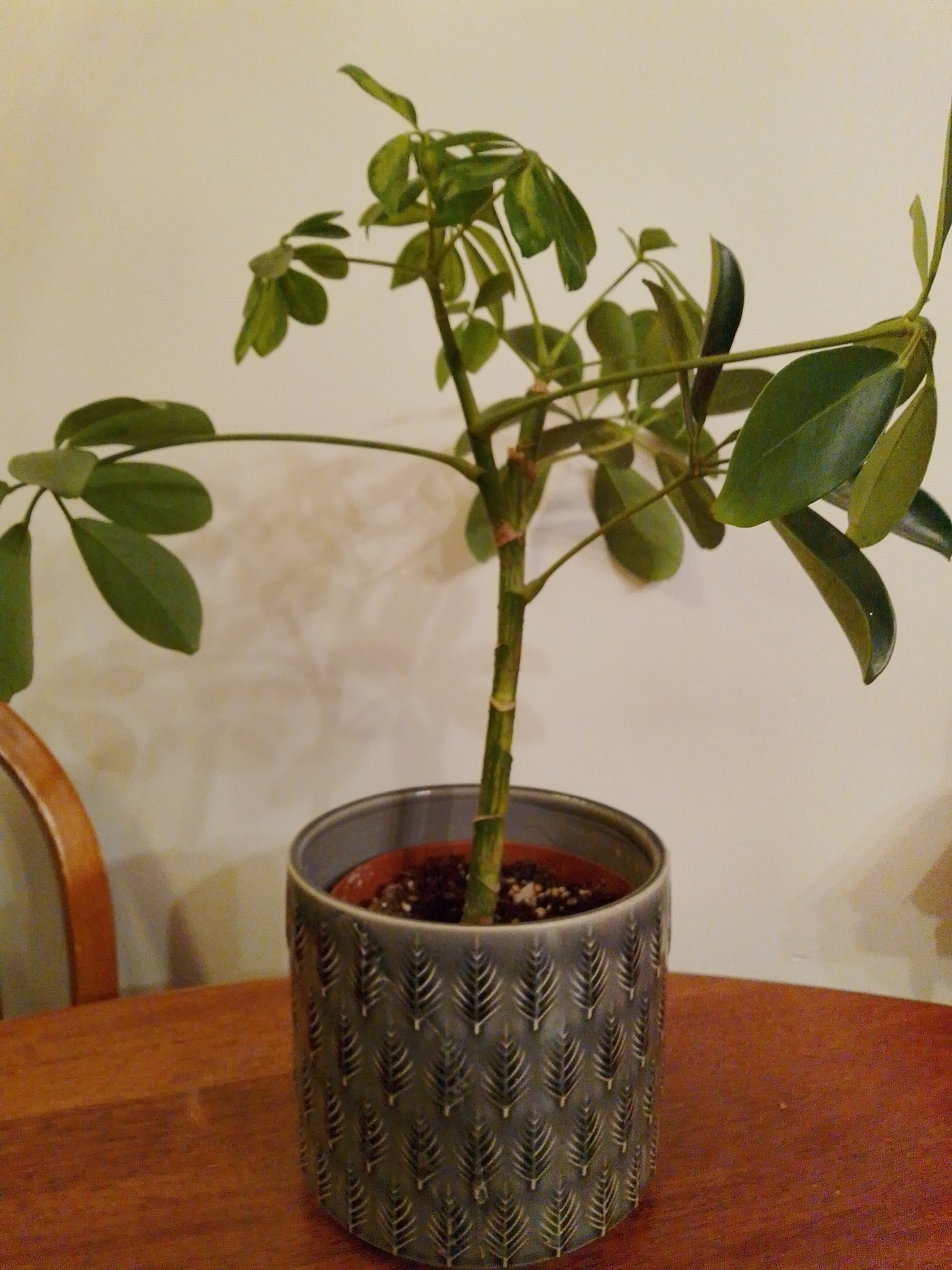
A houseplant
