= Aerial root =

Root which grows above the ground

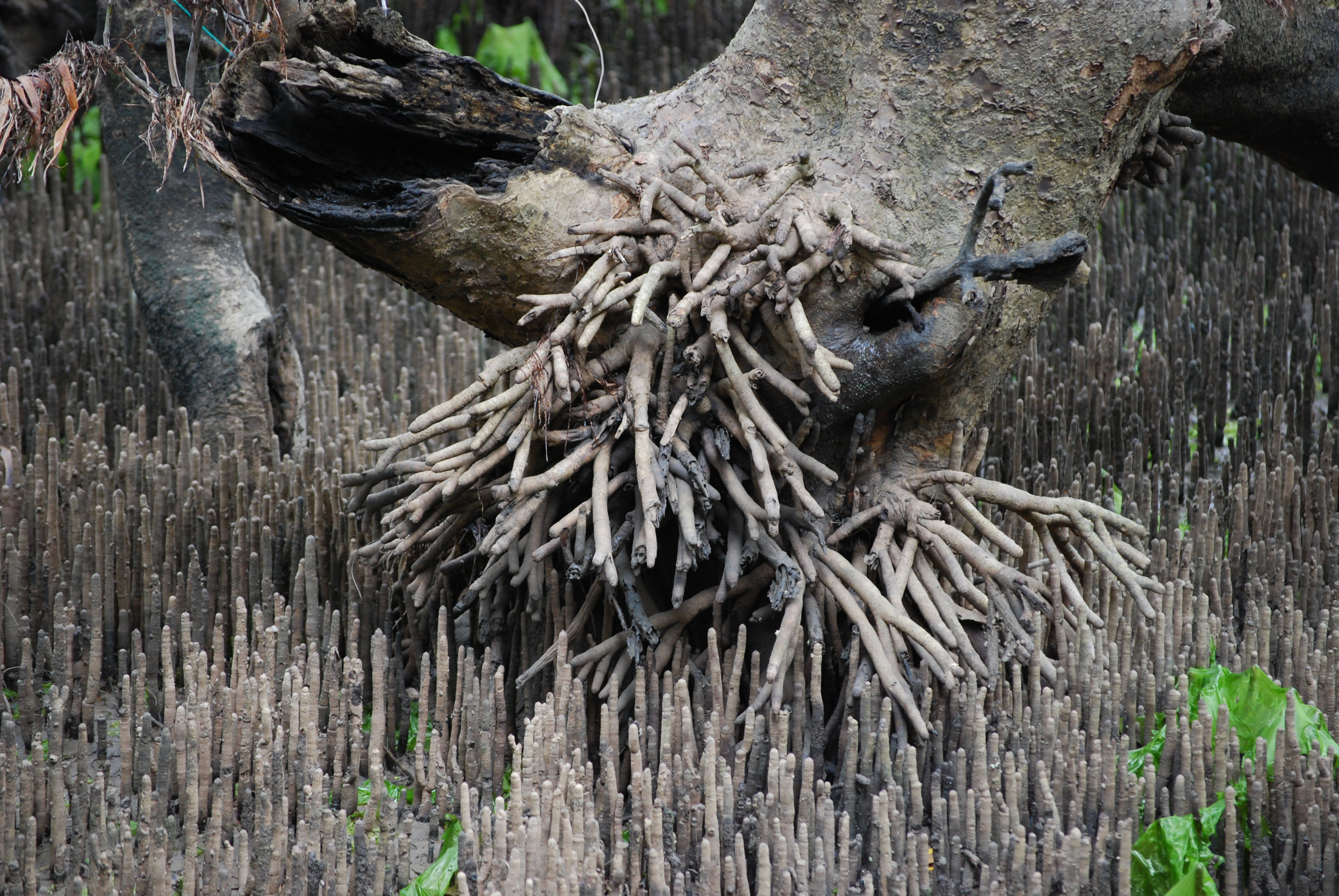
The grey mangrove (Avicennia marina)'s pneumatophorous aerial roots

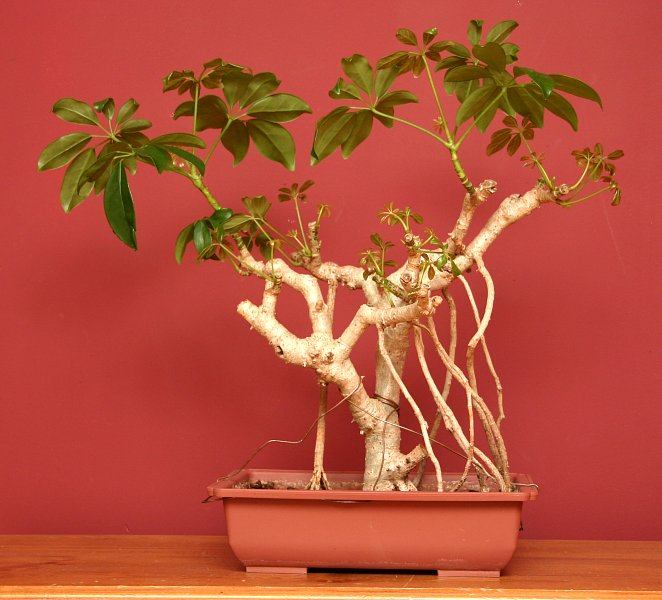
A Heptapleurum arboricola indoor bonsai soon after branch pruning to show extensive aerial roots

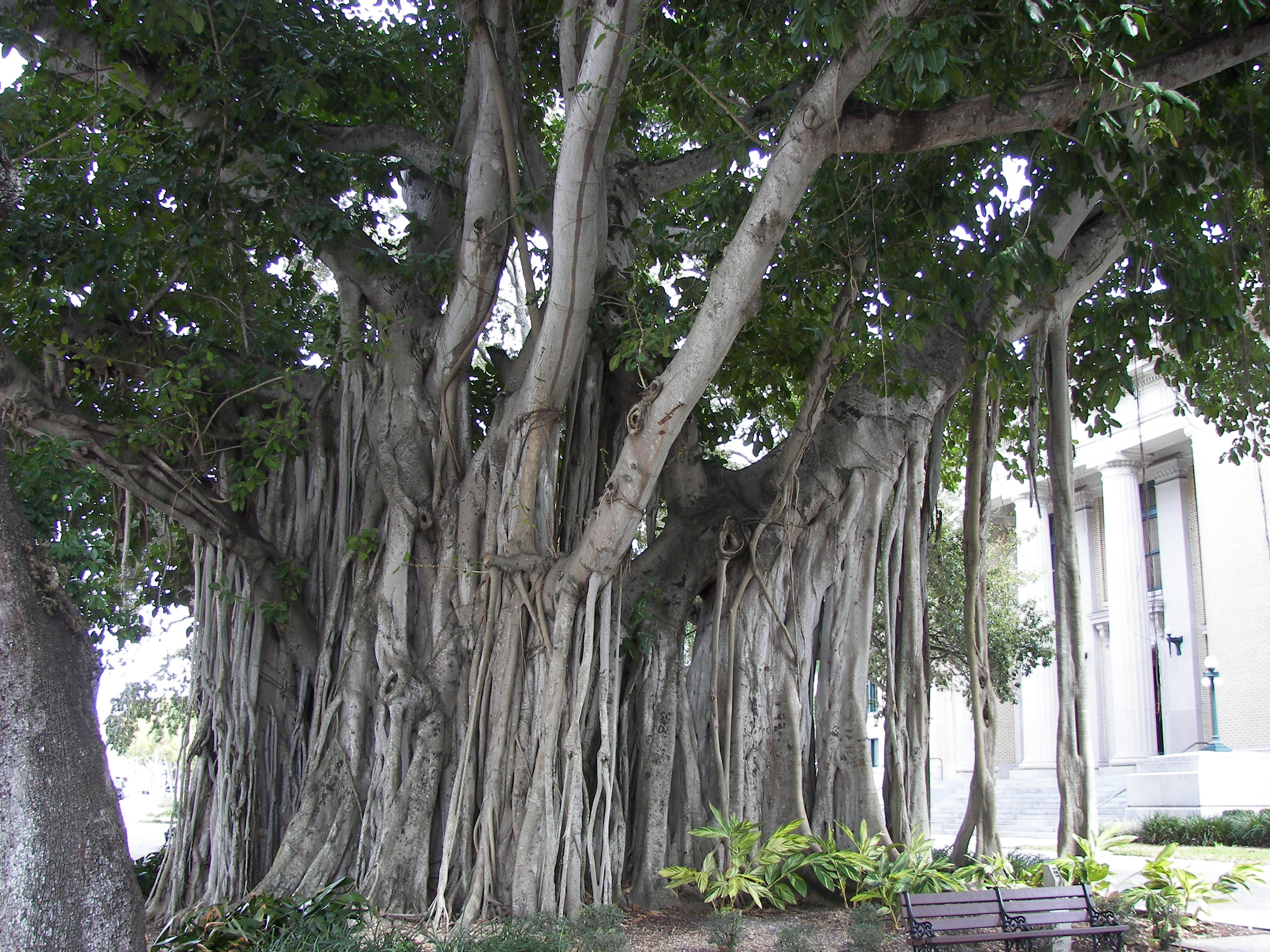
Banyan tree of undetermined species in Fort Myers, Florida

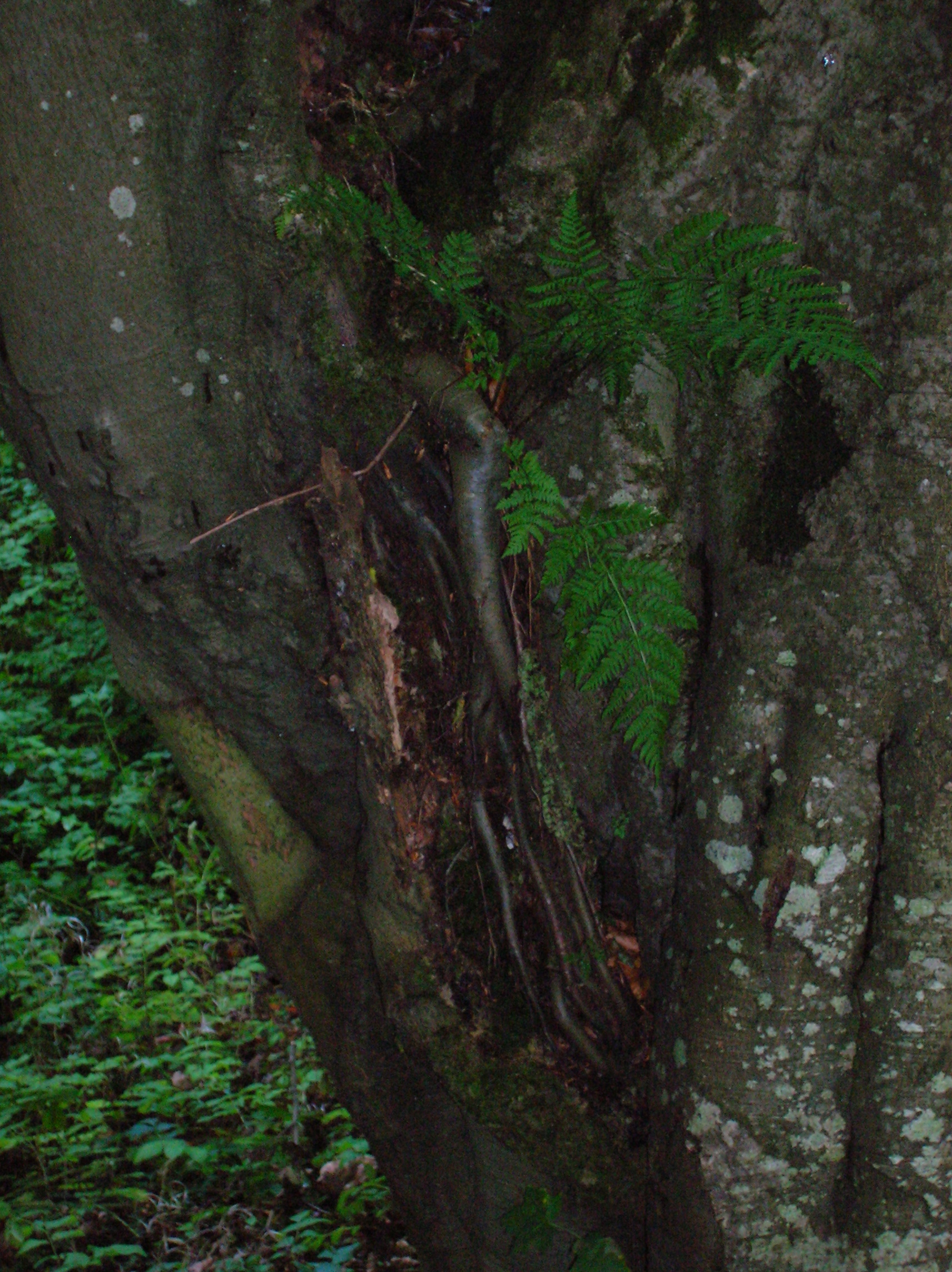
European beech with aerial roots in a wet Scottish glen

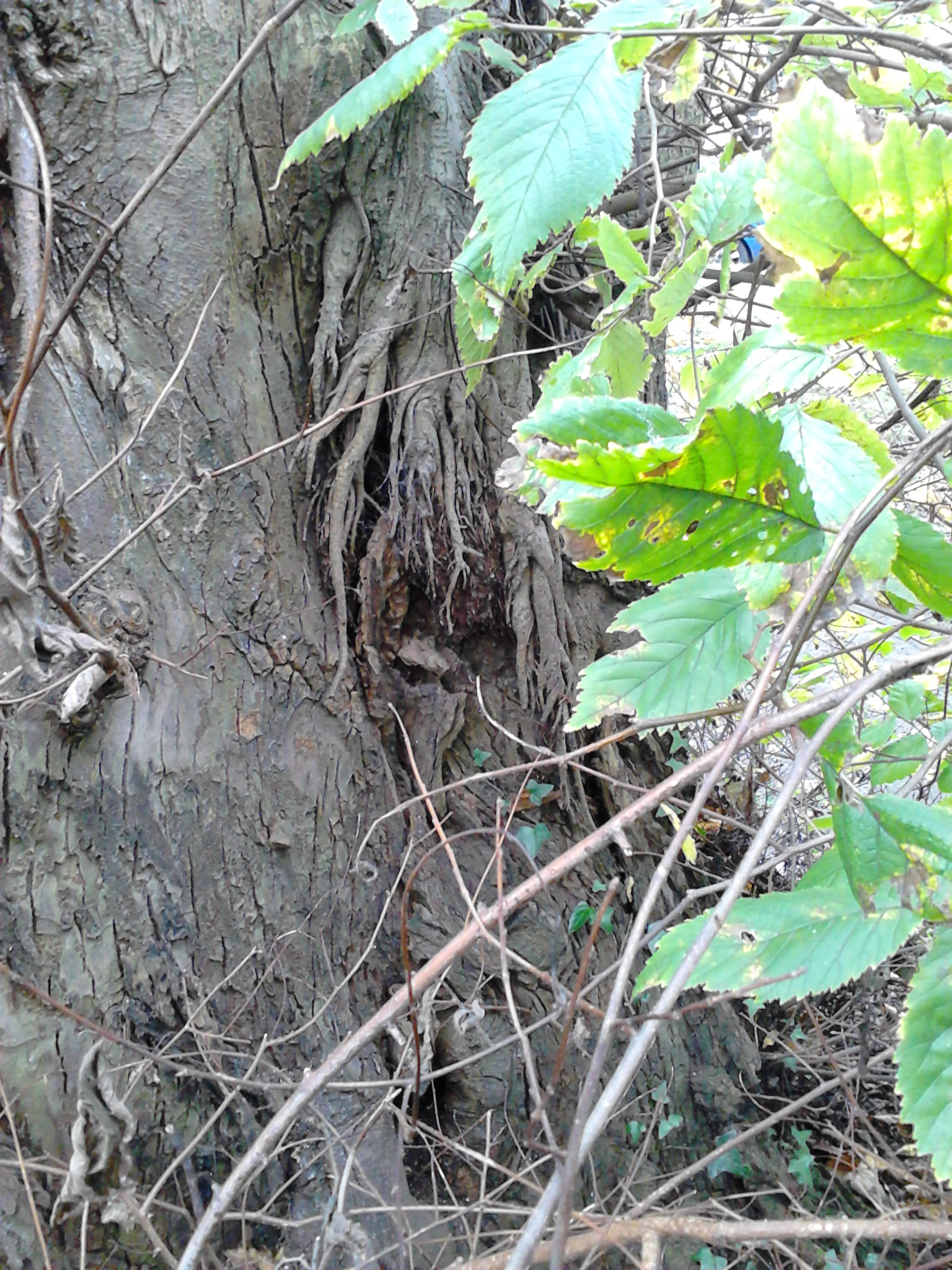
Hybrid elm cultivar with aerial roots, Edinburgh

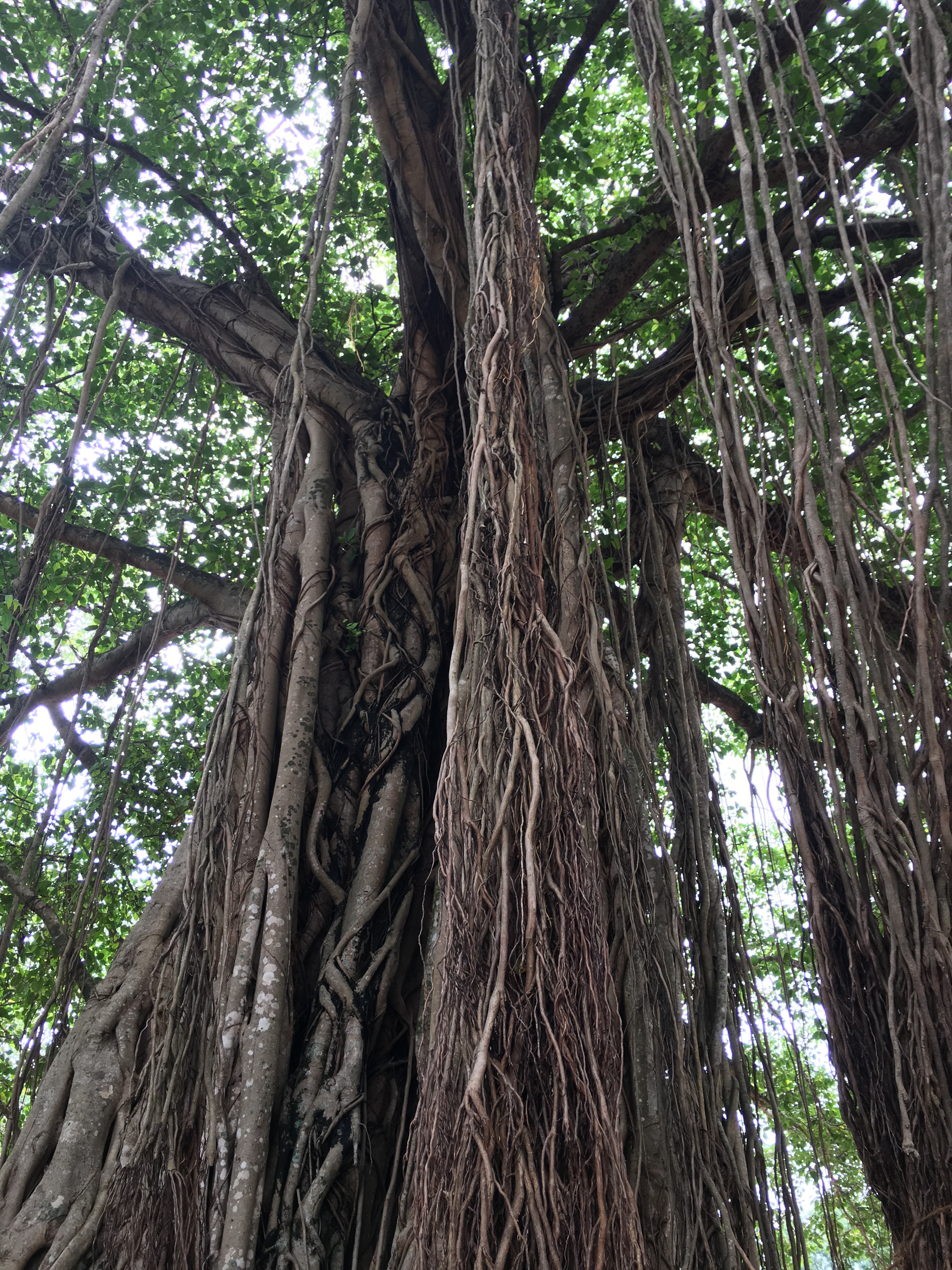
Indian banyan tree in Kodungallur Temple, Kerala, India

Aerial roots are roots growing above the ground. They are often adventitious, i.e. formed from nonroot tissue. They are found in diverse plant species, including epiphytes such as orchids (Orchidaceae), tropical coastal swamp trees such as mangroves, banyan figs (Ficus subg. Urostigma), the warm-temperate rainforest rata (Metrosideros robusta), and pōhutukawa trees of New Zealand (Metrosideros excelsa). Vines such as common ivy (Hedera helix) and poison ivy (Toxicodendron radicans) also have aerial roots.

== Types ==
This plant organ that is found in so many diverse plant-families has different specializations that suit the plant-habitat. In general growth-form, they can be technically classed as negatively gravitropic (grows up and away from the ground) or positively gravitropic (grows down toward the ground).

=== "Stranglers" (prop-root) ===
Banyan trees are an example of a strangler fig that begins life as an epiphyte in the crown of another tree. Their roots grow down and around the stem of the host, their growth accelerating once the ground has been reached. Over time, the roots coalesce to form a pseudotrunk, which may give the appearance that it is strangling the host.

Another strangler that begins life as an epiphyte is the Moreton Bay fig (Ficus macrophylla) of tropical and subtropical eastern Australia, which has powerfully descending aerial roots. In the subtropical to warm-temperate rainforests of northern New Zealand, Metrosideros robusta, the rata tree, sends aerial roots down several sides of the trunk of the host. From these descending roots, horizontal roots grow out to girdle the trunk and fuse with the descending roots. In some cases, the "strangler" outlives the host tree, leaving as its only trace a hollow core in the massive pseudotrunk of the rata.

=== Pneumatophores ===
These specialized aerial roots enable plants to breathe air in habitats with waterlogged soil. The roots may grow downward from the stem or upward from typical roots. Some botanists classify them as aerating roots rather than aerial roots if they emerge from the soil. The surface of these roots is covered with porous lenticels, which lead to air-filled spongy tissue called aerenchyma. This tissue facilitates the diffusion of gases throughout the plant, as oxygen diffusion coefficient in air is four orders of magnitude greater than in water.

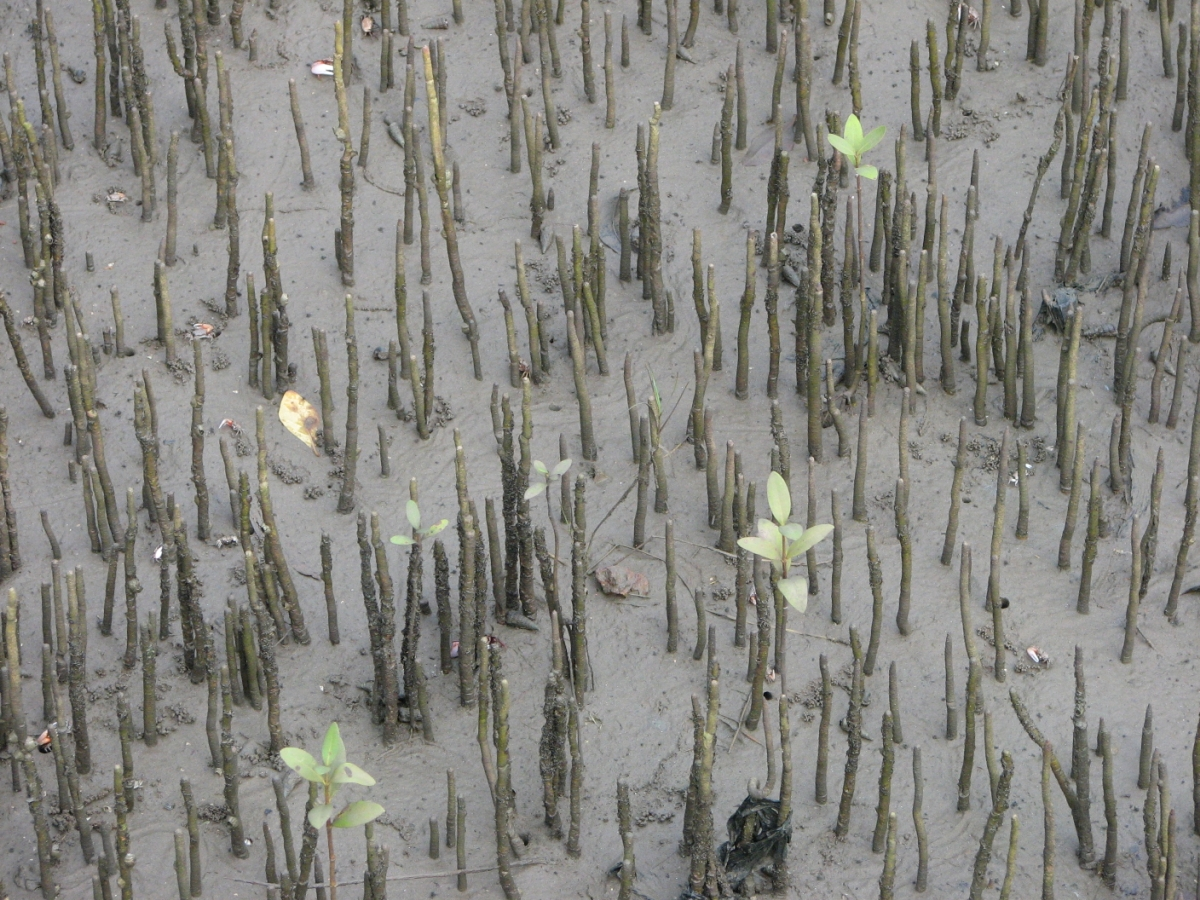
Pneumatophores of mangrove plant

Pneumatophores differentiate the black mangrove and grey mangrove from other mangrove species. Fishers in some areas of Southeast Asia make corks for fishing nets by shaping the pneumatophores of mangrove apples (Sonneratia caseolaris) into small floats.

Members of the subfamily Taxodioideae produce woody above-ground structures, known as cypress knees, that project upward from their horizontal roots. One hypothesis suggests that these structures function as pneumatophores, facilitating gas exchange in waterlogged soils. However, modern research has largely discredited this idea, as the knees lack aerenchyma and gas exchange through them is not significant. Their true functions remain unclear, with alternative theories proposing roles such as nutrient acquisition or storage, structural support, or erosion prevention.

=== Haustorial roots ===
These roots are found in parasitic plants, where aerial roots become cemented to the host plant via a sticky attachment disc before intruding into the tissues of the host. Mistletoe is an example of this.

=== Propagative roots ===
Adventitious roots usually develop from plantlet nodes formed via horizontal, above ground stems, termed stolons, e.g., strawberry runners, and spider plant.

Some leaves develop adventitious buds, which then form adventitious roots, e.g. piggyback plant (Tolmiea menziesii) and mother-of-thousands (Kalanchoe daigremontiana). The adventitious plantlets then drop off the parent plant and develop as separate clones of the parent.

== Pumping and physiology ==
Aerial roots may receive water and nutrient intake from the air. There are many types of aerial roots; some, such as mangrove, are used for aeration and not for water absorption. In other cases, they are used mainly for structure, and in order to reach the surface. Many plants rely on the leaf system for gathering the water into pockets, or onto scales. These roots function as terrestrial roots do.

Most aerial roots directly absorb the moisture from fog or humid air.

Some surprising results in studies on aerial roots of orchids show that the velamen (the white spongy envelope of the aerial roots), are actually totally waterproof, preventing water loss but not allowing any water in. Once reaching and touching a surface, the velamen is not produced in the contact area, allowing the root to absorb water like terrestrial roots.

Many other epiphytes – non-parasitic or semi-parasitic plants living on the surface of other plants – have developed cups and scales that gather rainwater or dew. The aerial roots in this case work as regular surface roots. There are also several types of roots, creating a cushion where a high humidity is retained.

Some of the aerial roots, especially in the genus Tillandsia, have a physiology that collects water from humidity, and absorbs it directly.

In the Sierra Mixe (named after the geographical area) variety of maize, aerial roots produce a sweet mucus that supports nitrogen fixing bacteria, which supply 30–80 percent of the plant's nitrogen needs.

== On houseplants ==
Many plants that are commonly grown indoors can develop aerial roots, such as Monstera deliciosa, pothos (Epipremnum aureum), rubber tree (Ficus elastica), fiddle leaf fig (Ficus lyrata), Thaumatophyllum bipinnatifidum, many Philodendron and succulents such as Echeveria.

Aerial roots on houseplants do not serve as much of a purpose as on outdoor plants, as there is no rain indoors and indoor humidity is often low due to A/C and heating systems. However, studies have shown that increasing indoor humidity can result in houseplant aerial roots growing longer in length, resulting in lower levels of transpiration and more efficient intake of nitrogen than aroid houseplants grown in standard indoor humidity. Aerial roots on houseplant cuttings increase the chances of successful propagation.

The presence of aerial roots is not an indicator of plant health. If a plant does not have aerial roots, that is no reason for concern.

== See also ==
- Adventitious
- Aeroponics
- Root
- Vegetative reproduction
- Vine
