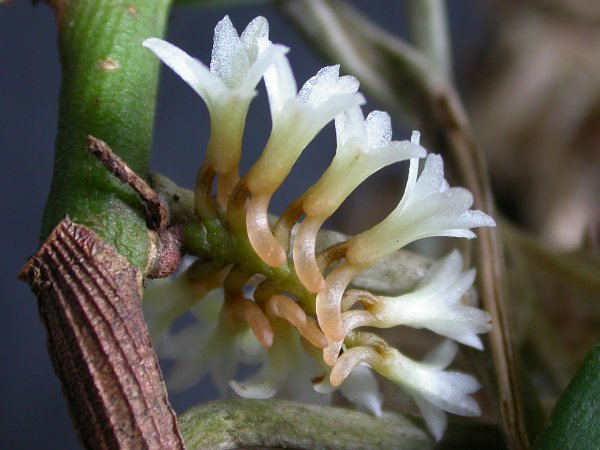

Scientific classification
- Kingdom: Plantae
- Clade: Tracheophytes
- Clade: Angiosperms
- Clade: Monocots
- Order: Asparagales
- Family: Orchidaceae
- Subfamily: Epidendroideae
- Genus: Campylocentrum
- Species: C. micranthum

Binomial name
- Campylocentrum micranthum (Lindl.) Rolfe (1901)

Synonyms
- Angraecum micranthum Lindl. (1835) (Basionym); Angraecum brevifolium Lindl. (1840); Aeranthes jamaicensis Rchb.f. ex Griseb. (1864); Angraecum jamaicense Rchb.f. & Wullschl. (1864); Aeranthes micrantha (Lindl.) Rchb.f. (1864); Epidorchis micrantha (Lindl.) Kuntze (1891); Mystacidium micranthum (Lindl.) T.Durand & Schinz (1894); Campylocentrum kuntzei Cogn. ex Kuntze (1898); Campylocentrum stenanthum Schltr. (1912); Campylocentrum peniculus Schltr.(1922); Campylocentrum mattogrossense Hoehne (1941)

= Campylocentrum micranthum =

Species of orchid

Campylocentrum micranthum is a species of orchid. It is native to an area from Jalisco east to Puerto Rico and south to Bolivia and Brazil.

== Bibliography ==
- Mújica E. B., 2001 : « Phénologie de Campylocentrum micranthum », L'orchidophile : revue de la société française d'orchidophilie n° 149, décembre 2001, pp. 227 s.
