= Indoor bonsai =

Miniature tree cultivated indoors

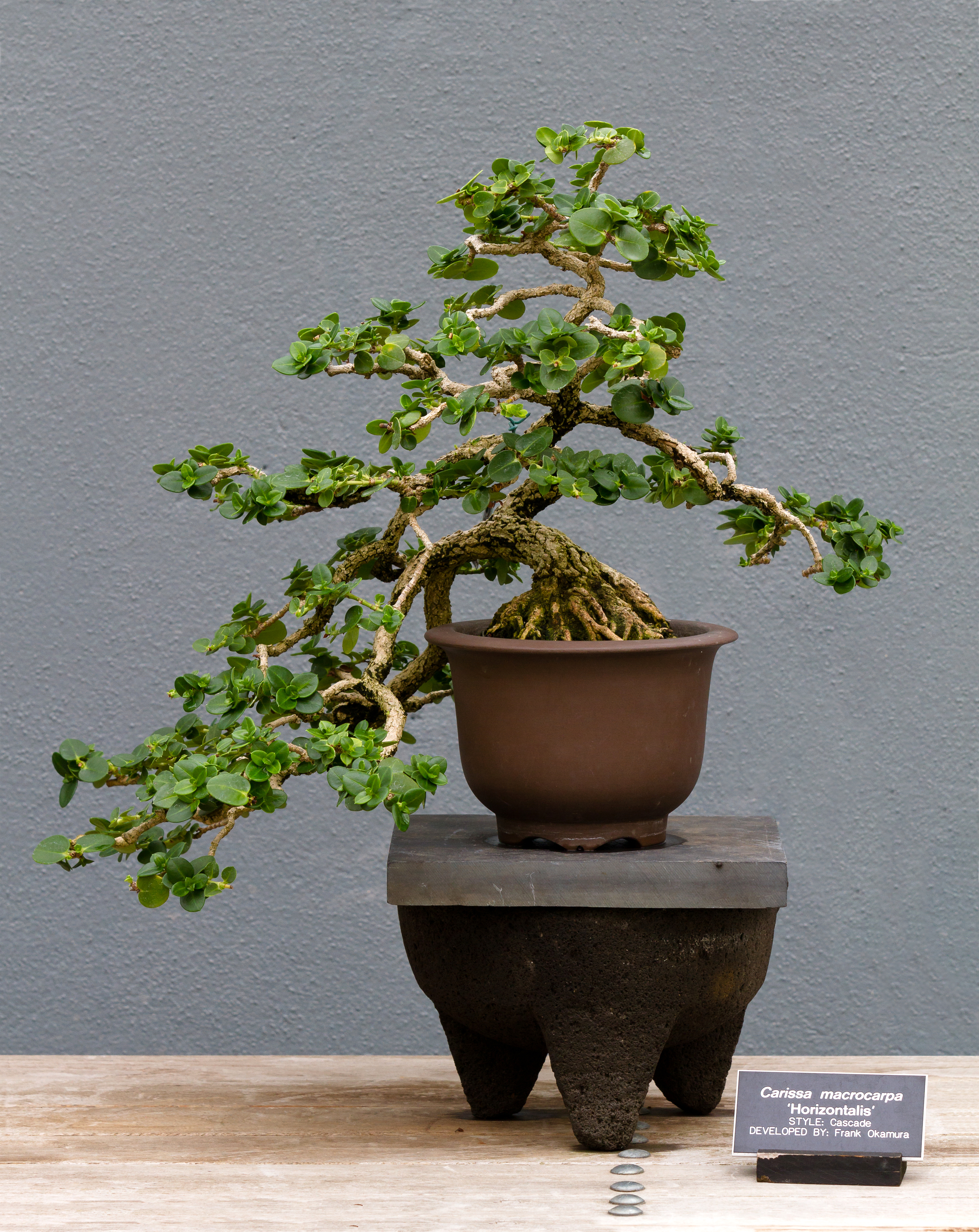
Carissa macrocarpa developed by Frank Okamura

Indoor bonsai are bonsai cultivated for the indoor environment. Traditionally, bonsai are temperate climate trees grown outdoors in containers. Tropical and sub-tropical tree species can be cultivated to grow and thrive indoors, with some suited to bonsai aesthetics shaped as traditional outdoor or wild bonsai.

Bonsai and related practices, like penjing, hòn non bộ, and saikei, involve the long-term cultivation of small trees and landscapes in containers. The term bonsai is generally used in English as an umbrella term for all miniature trees in containers or pots.

== Indoor vs. traditional bonsai ==
Indoor bonsai is the cultivation of an attractive, healthy plant in the artificial environment of indoors rather than using an outdoor climate, as may occur in traditional bonsai. Indoor penjing is the cultivation of miniature landscapes in a pot or tray, possibly with rocks, bonsai trees, and ground covers, and sometimes with small objects or figurines.

== Bonsai vs. other forms of house plant ==
Compared to the usual potted house plant, bonsai are rooted in a much smaller amount of soil. Consequently, they require more frequent watering and feeding. This form is therefore best suited for drought-resistant species. Compared to usual house gardening, bonsais require a lot more pruning, both of branches and roots.

== Cultivation and care ==
Many of the techniques used to grow and shape outdoor bonsai apply equally to indoor bonsai. For example, shaping techniques like pruning, wiring, and grafting work much the same for both types of bonsai. But indoor bonsai also have some special requirements for cultivation and care.

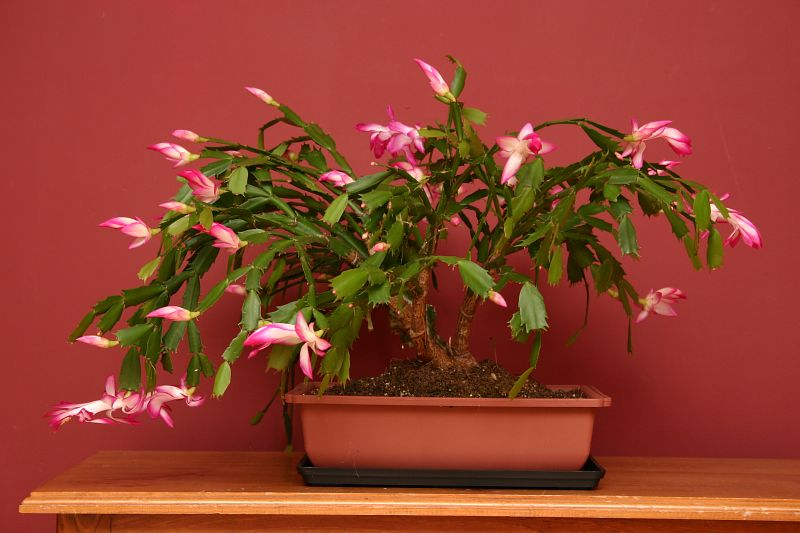
Christmas Cactus (Schlumbergera)

=== Lighting ===
An indoor room comfortably lit for human use provides too little light for most species of tree to grow. Few species will thrive with less than 500 lux available several hours per day. Successful indoor bonsai cultivation requires either selecting from the short list of low-light-tolerant trees, or providing additional lighting for the trees. Insufficient light may not kill some species outright, but will make their growth so slow that the bonsai shaping techniques cannot be used: the plant will not grow back after pruning or leaf trimming.

The simplest way to provide extra light is to place the bonsai close to an outside window. Care is taken not to harm the plant either with cold air entering through the window, or with high radiated heat from direct exposure to the sun. More controllable light, and more flexibility in situating the bonsai, can be obtained using artificial lighting. Fluorescent lighting (preferably with bulbs radiating growth-friendly spectra) and light-emitting diode lighting can give sufficient light to support a significant number of indoor bonsai species. These lights also have the advantage of blending with other indoor lighting, so that the plants can be grown in normal living quarters. For plants needing the highest amount of light, or for large numbers of bonsai being maintained indoors, a space dedicated to bonsai cultivation can support high-intensity lamps and optionally the special ventilation or cooling often needed for their use.

=== Temperature ===
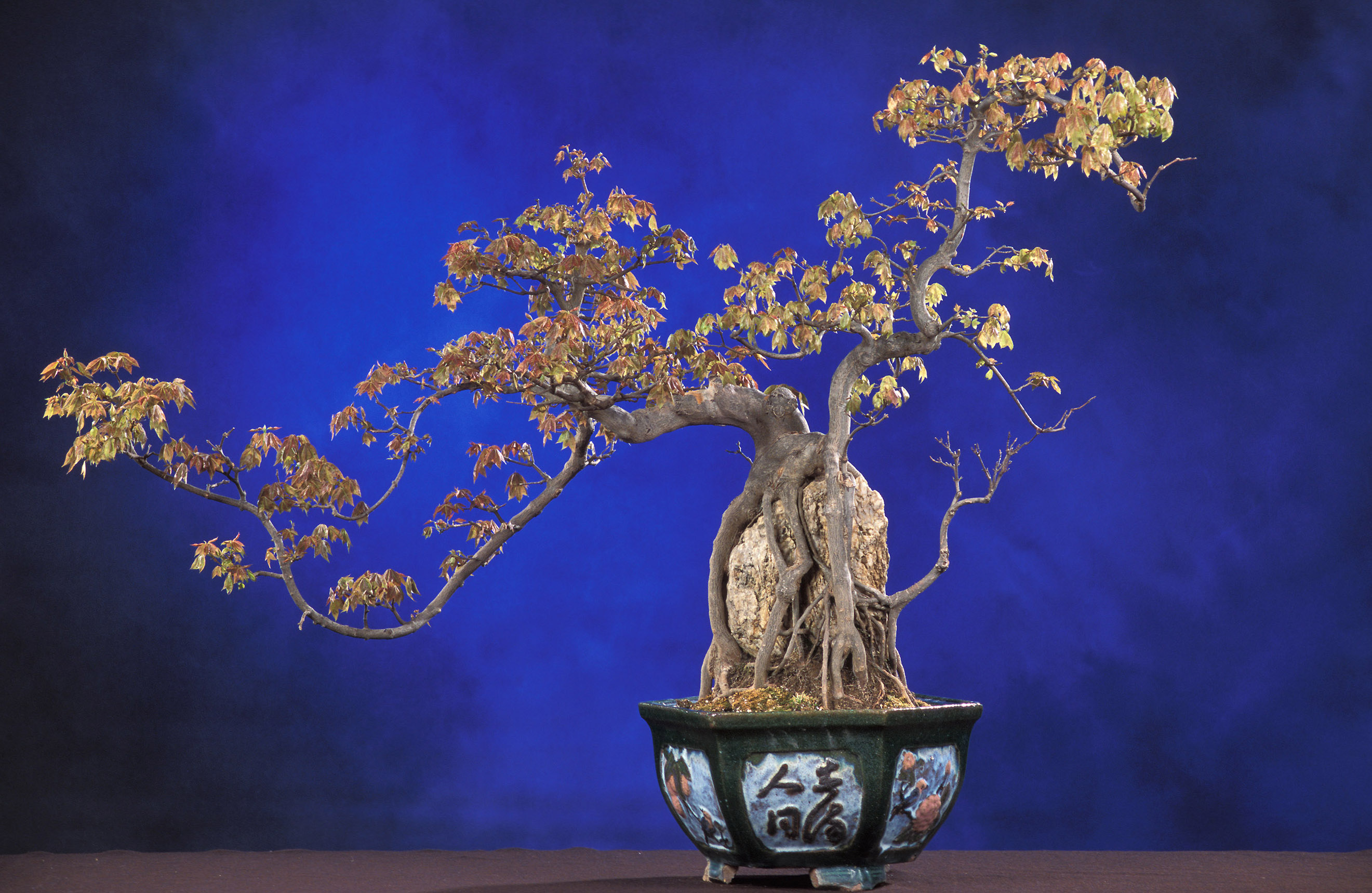
Acer buergerianum, U.S. National Bonsai and Penjing Museum

Suitable temperatures for indoor bonsai extend from standard room temperature downward. The best temperature range for a tree is determined by its species and, less directly, by its normal range in the wild. Tropical trees are usually tolerant of room temperature year-round but cannot tolerate temperatures approaching freezing, as might occur near an open window in cold weather. Semi-tropical and Mediterranean-climate trees often grow better when temperatures drop well below room temperature during winter months. The lower temperature, combined with shorter periods of daylight, triggers an expected annual dormancy which many non-tropical species need in order to thrive. These non-tropical trees need a cool location in the winter, such as a cool window ledge or "cold room" area in the house. In addition to the need for seasonal temperature variation, many non-tropicals grow better when there is a distinct difference between day temperatures (warm) and night (cooler).

=== Humidity ===
Indoor conditions, particularly in homes outside the tropics, imply very low humidity. Both air conditioning and room heating reduce air humidity significantly. Some tree species, such as ficus sp. with their waxy leaves, are tolerant of low humidity. Many species, however, require additional humidification to survive indoors. As with lighting, some humidification solutions can be integrated into the regular living area and some require a dedicated space. Local humidity can be raised by locating the bonsai containers over a tray of water, or by placing them in a bed of dampened sand. For better effect, the bonsai can be placed in enclosures, such as terrariums, that are humidified from within. For the maximum humidity, a dedicated room with high-capacity evaporative or misting humidifiers can support the most sensitive bonsai.

== Plants suitable for indoor bonsai ==
=== Tropical ===
The creation of bonsai is limited only by the imagination and talent of the gardener, although some species are much more suitable than others. Members of the genus Ficus are among the most versatile, while many succulents can be grown in a similar fashion. Here is an incomplete list of the most popular species.

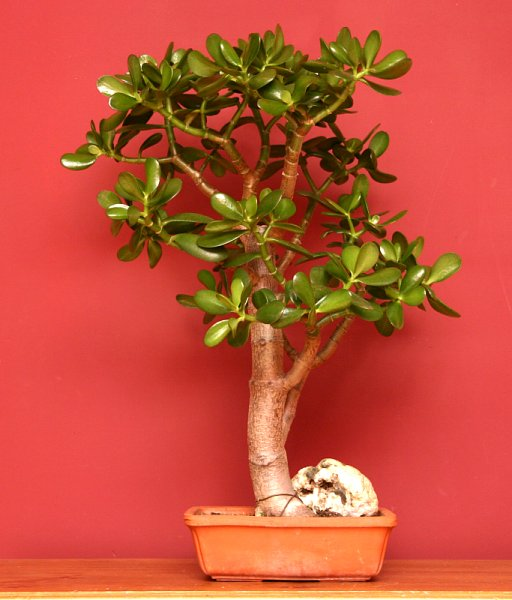
Crassula ovata

- Crassula ovata: The jade plant is a very robust and drought-resistant house plant. The miniature cultivars like the baby jade plant (C. ovata arborescens) is considered the best plant for a first bonsai. This plant will sprout on old wood. Thus, an old specimen can be pruned back to a stockier shape with thick trunk. It is kept dry in winter, placed outdoors in summer for full growth. Its roots are thin and cannot be exposed.
- Cycas revoluta: This plant is often used as an indoor bonsai. Though it does not have a traditional tree shape, it can give an image of a tropical island.
- Dracaena marginata: The dragon plant has an interesting palm-like shape. It can sprout on old wood. It does not tolerate root exposure.
- Ficus benjamina: The weeping fig is a popular indoor tree that lends itself to the classical, upright form. It is one of the few tropicals that are accepted as "true" bonsai. The miniature cultivars like 'Too Little' are also well suited for bonsai. It forms aerial roots and can be shaped as a banyan tree. Ficus are intolerant to branch down-pruning; one must start with a small tree and keep it small. They are sensitive to stress.
- Ficus salicaria: According to Jerry Meislik, "the most useful fig for bonsai is the willow leafed fig. The small leaf is in excellent scale for bonsai and the tree has good branch ramification, good basal rootage and excellent aerial root formation."
- Portulacaria afra: The dwarf jade looks a lot like a baby jade plant and is used similarly.

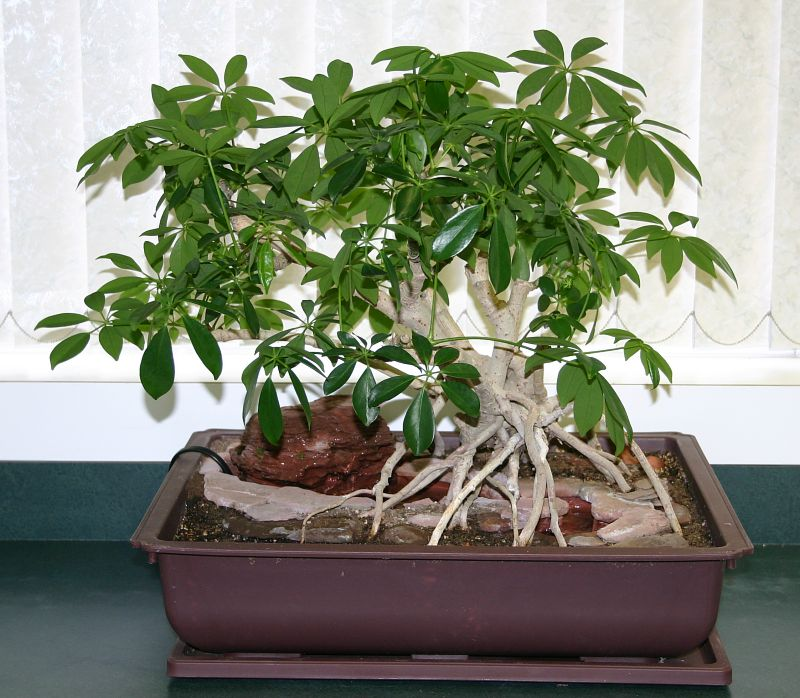
Heptapleurum arboricola

- Heptapleurum arboricola: The Hawaiian umbrella tree is a popular, hardy houseplant that is ideal for irregular, banyan or roots-on-rock forms. Since it can sprout on old wood, an old specimen can be pruned back to a stockier shape with thick trunk and roots. It tolerates root exposure very well, is drought-resistant and requires a moderate amount of light. Under high humidity conditions, it produces aerial roots and can therefore be shaped as a banyan tree.
- Schlumbergera: The Christmas cactus does not have a real trunk but easily lends itself to a cascade-type bonsai shape. It tolerates shade, not drought.
- Tamarindus indica The tamarind has recently become popular in bonsai culture, frequently used in Asian countries like Indonesia, Taiwan and the Philippines. In the last Japan Airlines World Bonsai competition, Mr. Budi Sulistyo of Indonesia won the second prize with an ancient tamarind bonsai.

Small succulents may be used as accent plants:

- Hatiora salicornoides

=== Other climatic origins ===
With proper care, a number of non-tropical plants can also thrive as indoor bonsai.

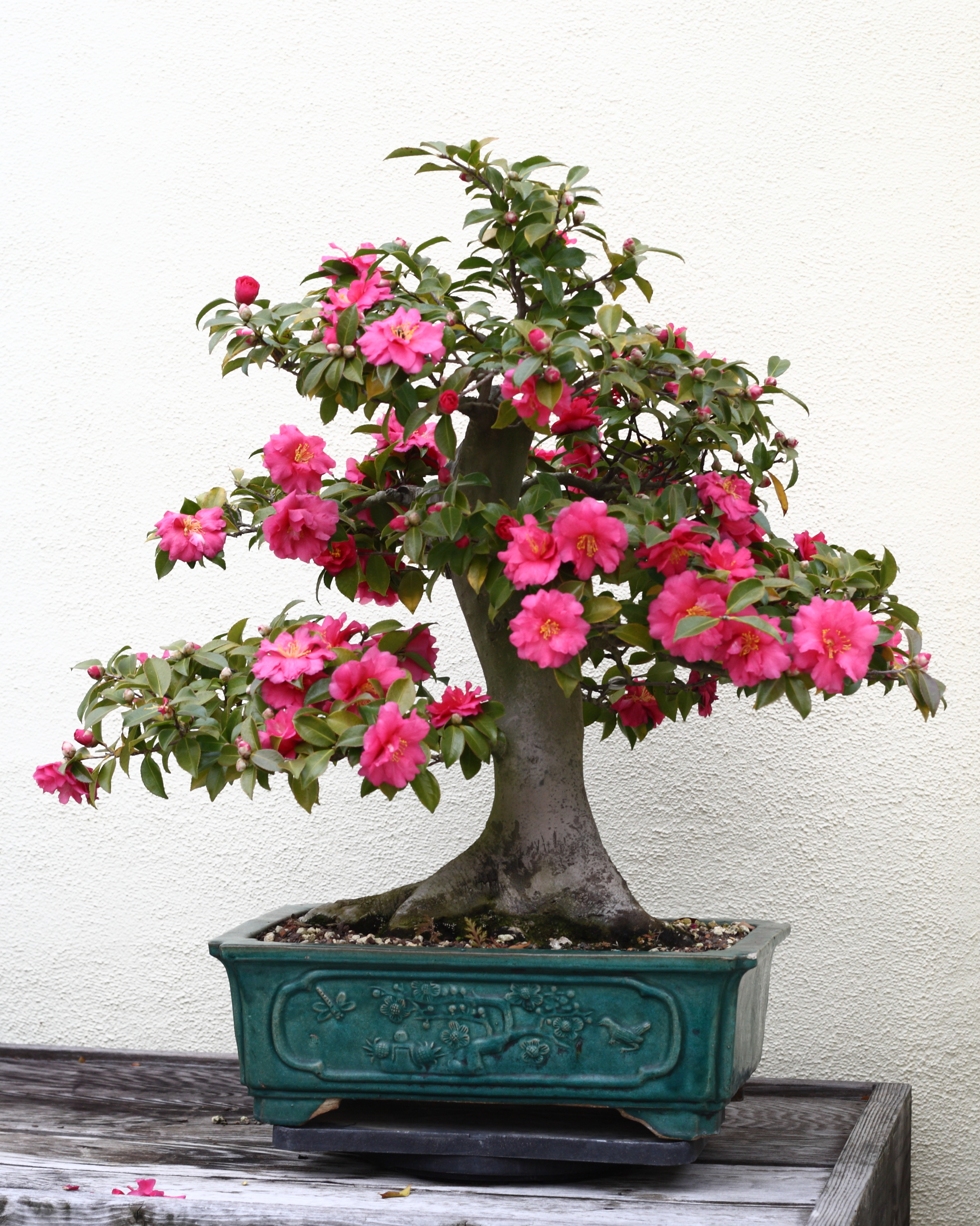
Camellia japonica, U.S. National Bonsai and Penjing Museum

- Araucaria heterophylla: The Norfolk Pine is a needle-bearing evergreen. It does well indoors and is often seen in commercial buildings, but is not easily shaped to bonsai styles.
- Ardisia crenata: The spear-flower will flower and produce berry-like fruit when grown indoors.
- Bougainvillea: Native to South America, this flowering shrub, will grow indoors with sufficient light.
- Bucida molineti: The black olive is native to southern Florida in the US, and has a compact growth habit suited to bonsai forms.
- Boxwood: Found on nearly every continent, boxwood varieties are tough but attractive bonsai. The varieties Buxus harlandii and Buxus microphylla (Kingsville boxwood) have tiny leaves and develop mature-looking bark, supporting bonsai aesthetics.
- Calliandra haematocephala (Red powderpuff): The Calliandra family includes evergreen bushes growing in tropical and subtropical areas worldwide. The haematocephala species has small needle-like leaves and unusual-looking feathery blossom that appear in spring and summer.
- Camellia japonica (Common camellia), Camellia sinensis: In the mountains of Japan and Korea, trees of the Camellia family grow up to 10 to 12 meters high. Camellia sinensis in particular suit bonsai treatment, with relatively small leaves and flowers.
- Carmona microphylla: The sturdy trunk and glossy green leaves of the Fukien Tea make an attractive indoor bonsai. Tiny white flowers appear regularly, and a characteristically rough or gnarled bark gives an appearance of age on even young bonsai.
- Casuarina equisetifolia (Horsetail tree): The horsetail tree grows up to 25 meters in the wild, but can be cultivated indoors as a compact bonsai. Its foliage is needle-like although the plant is considered a deciduous tree, and it can be shaped to resemble a spruce or pine.
- Citrus japonica 'Hindsii' (Kumquat): This fruiting tree is one of the kumquat varieties, and relatives with small leaves suitable for indoor bonsai include Citrus japonica 'Margarita', Citrus japonica 'Japonica' (Marumi kumquat), × Citrofortunella mitis, Citrus aurantifolia (Key lime), and Citrofortunella microcarpa (Calamondin). The trees flower and may even bear fruit in pot cultivation.
- Cupressus macrocarpa: The Monterey Cypress is one of the few evergreen conifers that can be grown indoors. Trunk thickness is difficult to develop, but the fine juniper-like foliage suits even small bonsai.
- Feroniella lucida: Native to southeast Asia, this tree flowers and produces edible fruit. It is a slow grower in a container, but small leaves and a rough trunk make it very suitable for bonsai.
- Fraxinus uhdei (Tropical ash): Though the leaf clusters do not match common bonsai aesthetics, this tree can be shaped into an effective bonsai, particularly as the trunk ages and develops character.
- Ligustrum sp.: Some privet species, including Ligustrum japonica and Ligustrum rotundifolium, are suitable subjects for indoor bonsai.

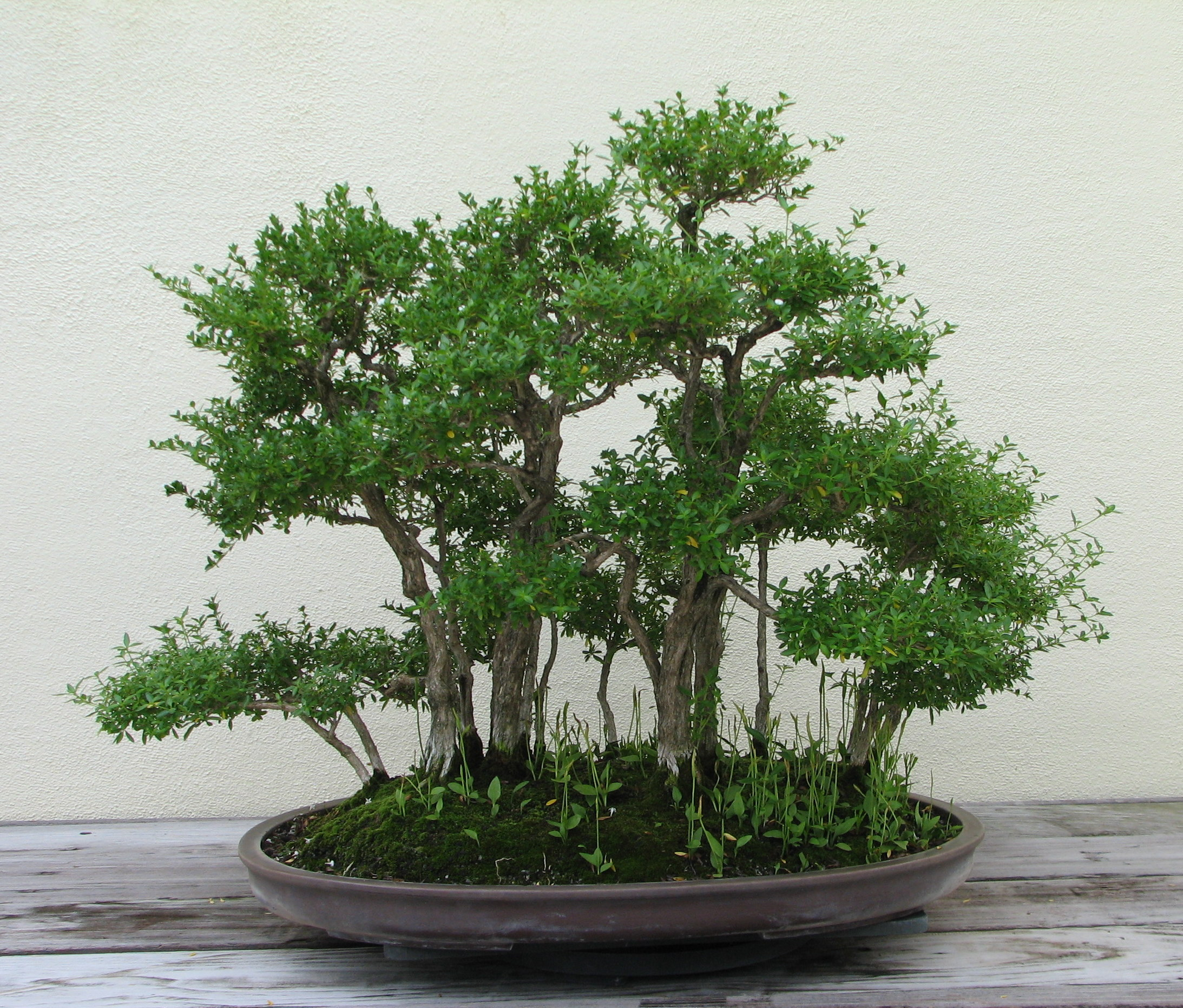
Serissa japonica, U.S. National Bonsai and Penjing Museum

- Serissa: This is a delicate flowering plant with tiny leaves that can grow indoors year round.
- Syzygium paniculatum, syn. Eugenia paniculata: A flowering and fruiting evergreen tree with slender leaves, this native of Australia grows to 6 meters in the wild. As a bonsai, it can be shaped in most styles suiting deciduous trees.
- Ulmus parvifolia: The Chinese elm is often used as outdoor bonsai, and it can be raised indoors as well.

== See also ==
- Bonsai aesthetics
- Bonsai styles
- Houseplant
