= Campylocentrum pachyrrhizum =

Leafless bentspur orchid

Scientific classification
- Kingdom: Plantae
- Clade: Tracheophytes
- Clade: Angiosperms
- Clade: Monocots
- Order: Asparagales
- Family: Orchidaceae
- Subfamily: Epidendroideae
- Genus: Campylocentrum
- Species: C. pachyrrhizum

Binomial name
- Campylocentrum pachyrrhizum (Rchb.f.) Rolfe

Synonyms
- Aeranthes pachyrrhyza Rchb.f.; Aeranthes spathaceus Griseb.

Species of orchid

Campylocentrum pachyrrhizum is a species of orchid. It is native to the West Indies (Greater Antilles plus Trinidad), southern Mexico (Chiapas, Oaxaca, Yucatán Peninsula), Central America (Guatemala and Panama), northern South America (Venezuela, Ecuador, Brazil, the Guianas), and southern Florida.
