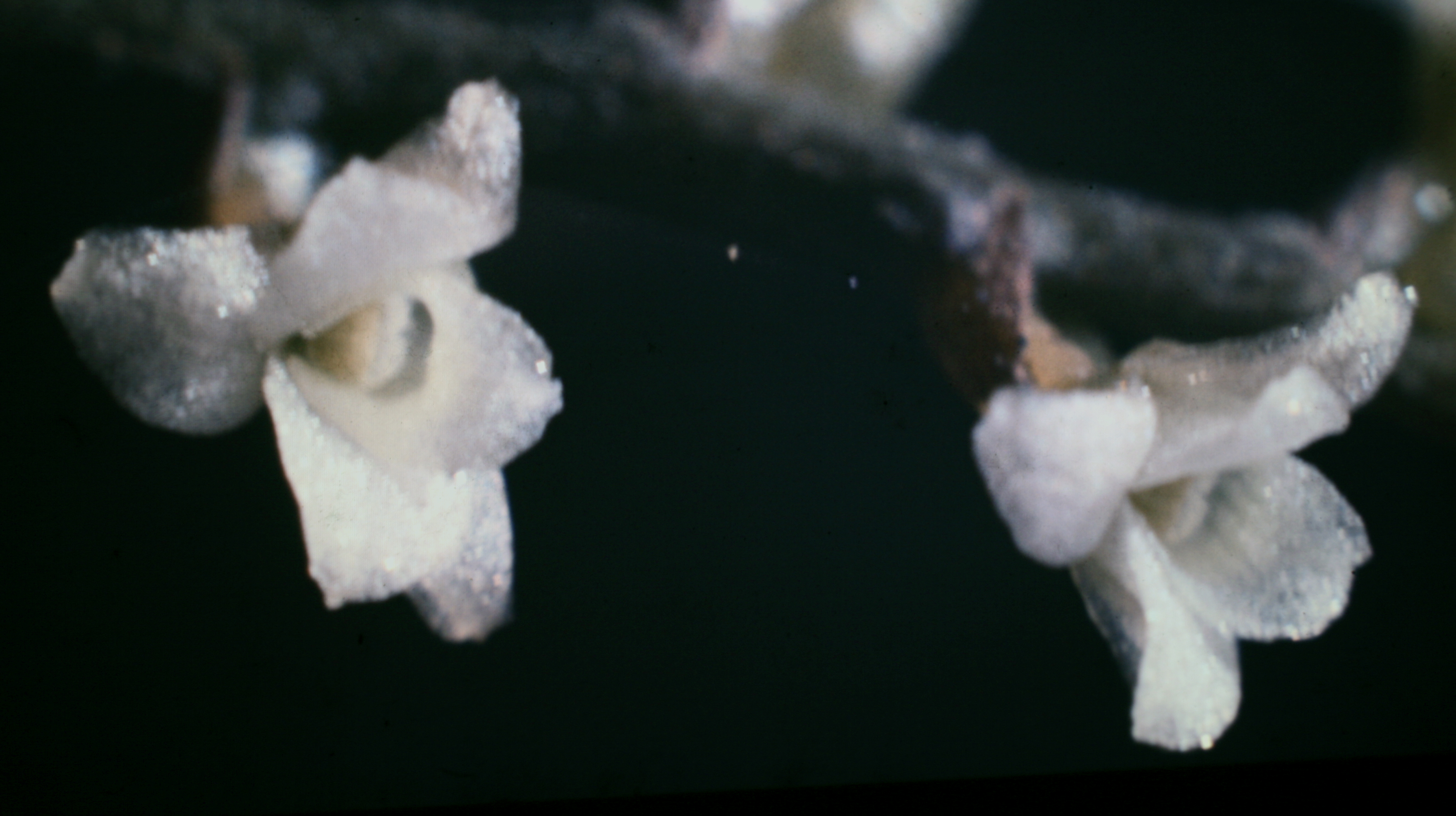
- Campylocentrum fasciola (Lindl.) Cogn.
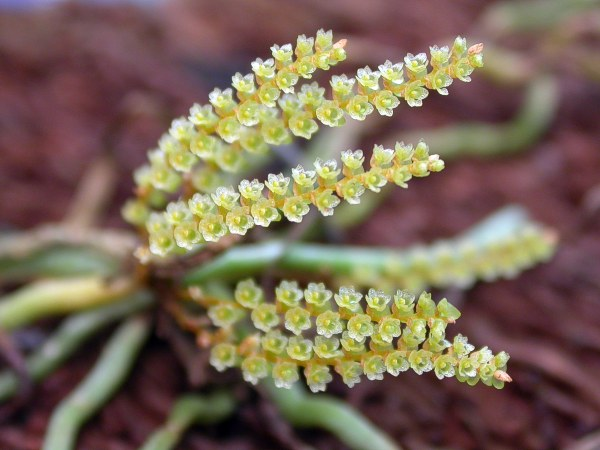
- Flowering specimen of Campylocentrum grisebachii Cogn.

Scientific classification
- Kingdom: Plantae
- Clade: Tracheophytes
- Clade: Angiosperms
- Clade: Monocots
- Order: Asparagales
- Family: Orchidaceae
- Subfamily: Epidendroideae
- Tribe: Vandeae
- Subtribe: Angraecinae
- Genus: Campylocentrum; Benth.

Type species
- Campylocentrum schiedei (Rchb.f.) Benth. ex Hemsl.

Synonyms
- Todaroa A.Rich. & Galeotti

= Campylocentrum =

Bent-spur orchids Temporal range: 8.21 –0 Ma Late Miocene – Recent

Genus of orchids

Campylocentrum is a genus of rare orchids (family Orchidaceae) native to Mexico, the West Indies, Central America and South America. One species (C. pachyrrhizum) extends its range into Florida.

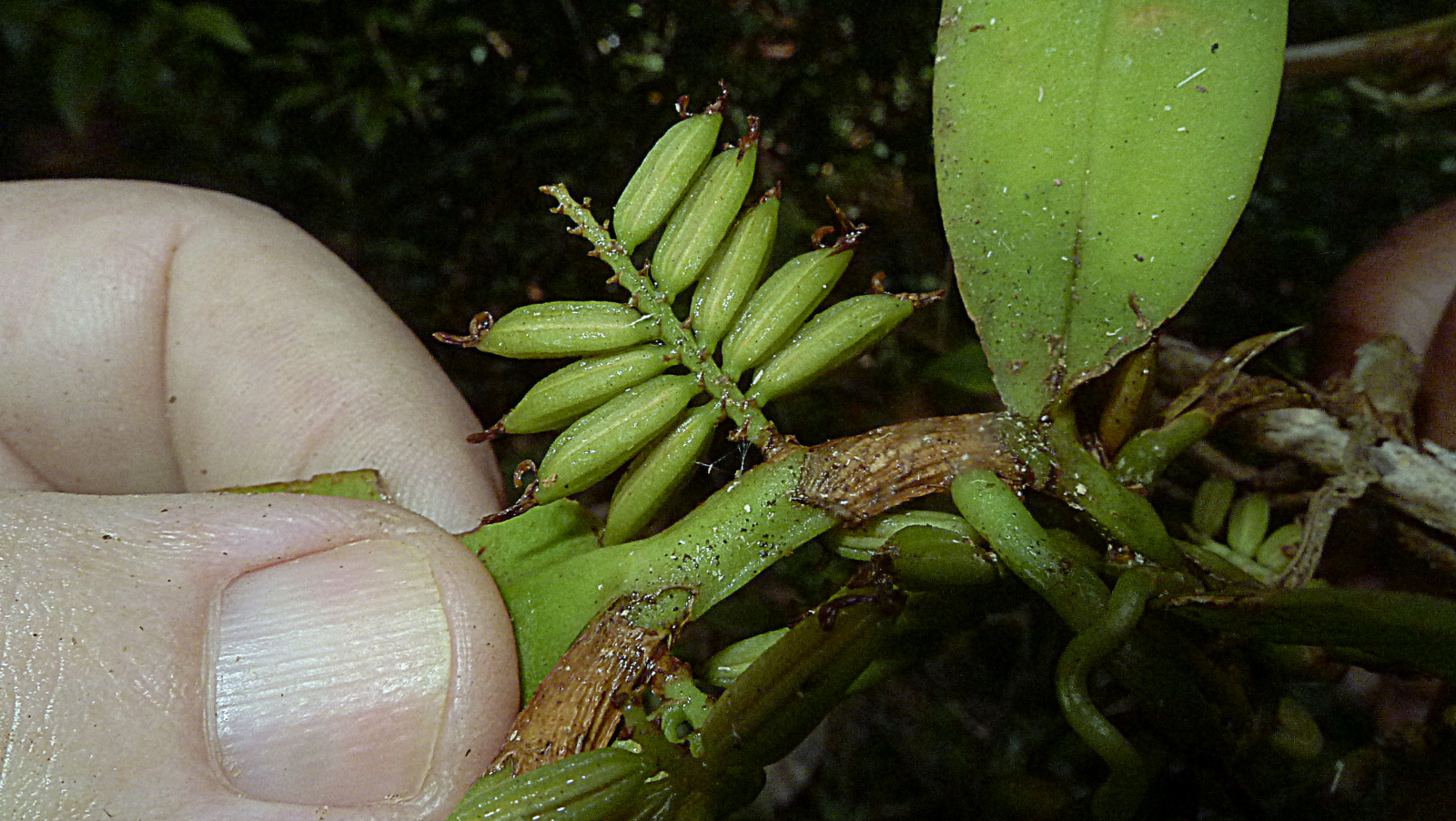
Campylocentrum micranthum with numerous seed capsules

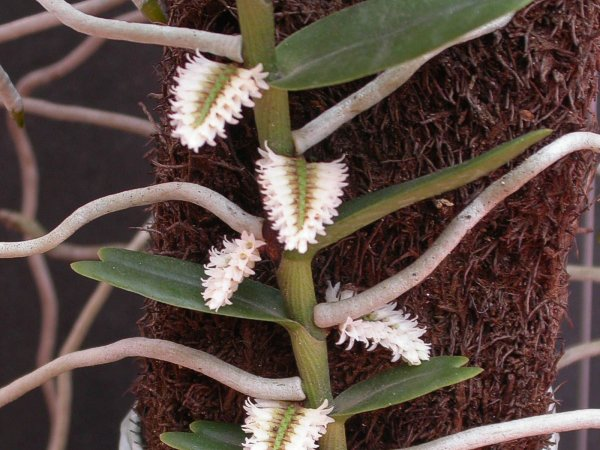
Flowering specimen of Campylocentrum crassirhizum

== Ecology ==
=== Pollination ===
Campylocentrum is likely pollinated by small moths and bees, in addition to flies, which may play a smaller role.

== Species ==
As of December 2025, Plants of the World Online accepts the following 78 species:

- Campylocentrum acutilobum Cogn.
- Campylocentrum alvesii E.M.Pessoa
- Campylocentrum amazonicum Cogn.
- Campylocentrum antioquiense Kolan. & Szlach.
- Campylocentrum apiculatum Schltr.
- Campylocentrum aromaticum Barb.Rodr.
- Campylocentrum asplundii Dodson
- Campylocentrum benelliae E.M.Pessoa & M.Alves
- Campylocentrum brachycarpum Cogn.
- Campylocentrum brenesii Schltr.
- Campylocentrum brevifolium (Lindl.) E.M.Pessoa & M.Alves
- Campylocentrum calostachyum (Barb.Rodr.) E.M.Pessoa & M.Alves
- Campylocentrum carvalhoi E.M.Pessoa & M.Alves
- Campylocentrum cornejoi Dodson
- Campylocentrum crassirhizum Hoehne
- Campylocentrum densiflorum Cogn.
- Campylocentrum ecuadorense Schltr.
- Campylocentrum embreei Dodson
- Campylocentrum escobariae Kolan. & Szlach.
- Campylocentrum fasciola (Lindl.) Cogn.
- Campylocentrum fernandezii Kolan. & Szlach.
- Campylocentrum generalense Bogarín & Pupulin
- Campylocentrum grisebachii Cogn.
- Campylocentrum guarinae Szlach. & Kolan.
- Campylocentrum hasslerianum Hoehne
- Campylocentrum hirtellum Cogn.
- Campylocentrum hirtzii Dodson
- Campylocentrum hondurense Ames
- Campylocentrum huebneri Mansf.
- Campylocentrum huebnerioides D.E.Benn. & Christenson
- Campylocentrum insulare C.E.Siqueira & E.M.Pessoa
- Campylocentrum intermedium (Rchb.f. & Warm.) Rolfe
- Campylocentrum itatiaiae E.M.Pessoa & M.Alves
- Campylocentrum jamaicense (Rchb.f. & Wullschl.) Benth. ex Fawc.
- Campylocentrum kuntzei Cogn. ex Kuntze
- Campylocentrum labiakii E.M.Pessoa & M.Alves
- Campylocentrum lansbergii (Rchb.f.) Schltr.
- Campylocentrum latifolium Cogn.
- Campylocentrum lutheri Archila & Chiron
- Campylocentrum luzmariae O.Perd., R.B.Singer & E.M.Pessoa
- Campylocentrum madisonii Dodson
- Campylocentrum mattogrossense Hoehne
- Campylocentrum micranthum (Lindl.) Rolfe
- Campylocentrum microphyllum Ames & Correll
- Campylocentrum minutum C.Schweinf.
- Campylocentrum misas-urretae Kolan. & Szlach.
- Campylocentrum natalieae Carnevali & I.Ramírez
- Campylocentrum neglectum (Rchb.f. & Warm.) Cogn.
- Campylocentrum organense (Rchb.f.) Rolfe
- Campylocentrum ornithorrhynchum (Lindl.) Rolfe
- Campylocentrum pachyrrhizum (Rchb.f.) Rolfe
- Campylocentrum palominoi Kolan., O.Pérez & E.Parra
- Campylocentrum paludosum E.M.Pessoa & M.R.Miranda
- Campylocentrum panamense Ames
- Campylocentrum parahybunense (Barb.Rodr.) Rolfe
- Campylocentrum pauloense Hoehne & Schltr.
- Campylocentrum peniculus Schltr.
- Campylocentrum pernambucense Hoehne
- Campylocentrum peruvianum (C.Schweinf.) E.M.Pessoa & M.Alves
- Campylocentrum poeppigii (Rchb.f.) Rolfe
- Campylocentrum polystachyum Rolfe
- Campylocentrum pubirhachis Schltr.
- Campylocentrum pugioniforme (Klotzsch) Rolfe
- Campylocentrum pygmaeum Cogn.
- Campylocentrum robustum Cogn.
- Campylocentrum schiedei (Rchb.f.) Benth. ex Hemsl.
- Campylocentrum schlechterianum E.M.Pessoa & M.Alves
- Campylocentrum schneeanum Foldats
- Campylocentrum sellowii (Rchb.f.) Rolfe
- Campylocentrum serranum E.M.Pessoa & M.Alves
- Campylocentrum spannagelii Hoehne
- Campylocentrum steyermarkii Foldats
- Campylocentrum tenellum Todzia
- Campylocentrum tenue (Lindl.) Rolfe
- Campylocentrum tyrridion Garay & Dunst. ex Foldats
- Campylocentrum ulei Cogn.
- Campylocentrum wawrae (Rchb.f. ex Beck) Rolfe
- Campylocentrum zehntneri Schltr.

== Horticulture ==
Campylocentrum is uncommon in cultivation. It can be grown mounted on bark under moist conditions. The species with functional leaves should be grown with additional moss, while the leafless species should be grown without it.
