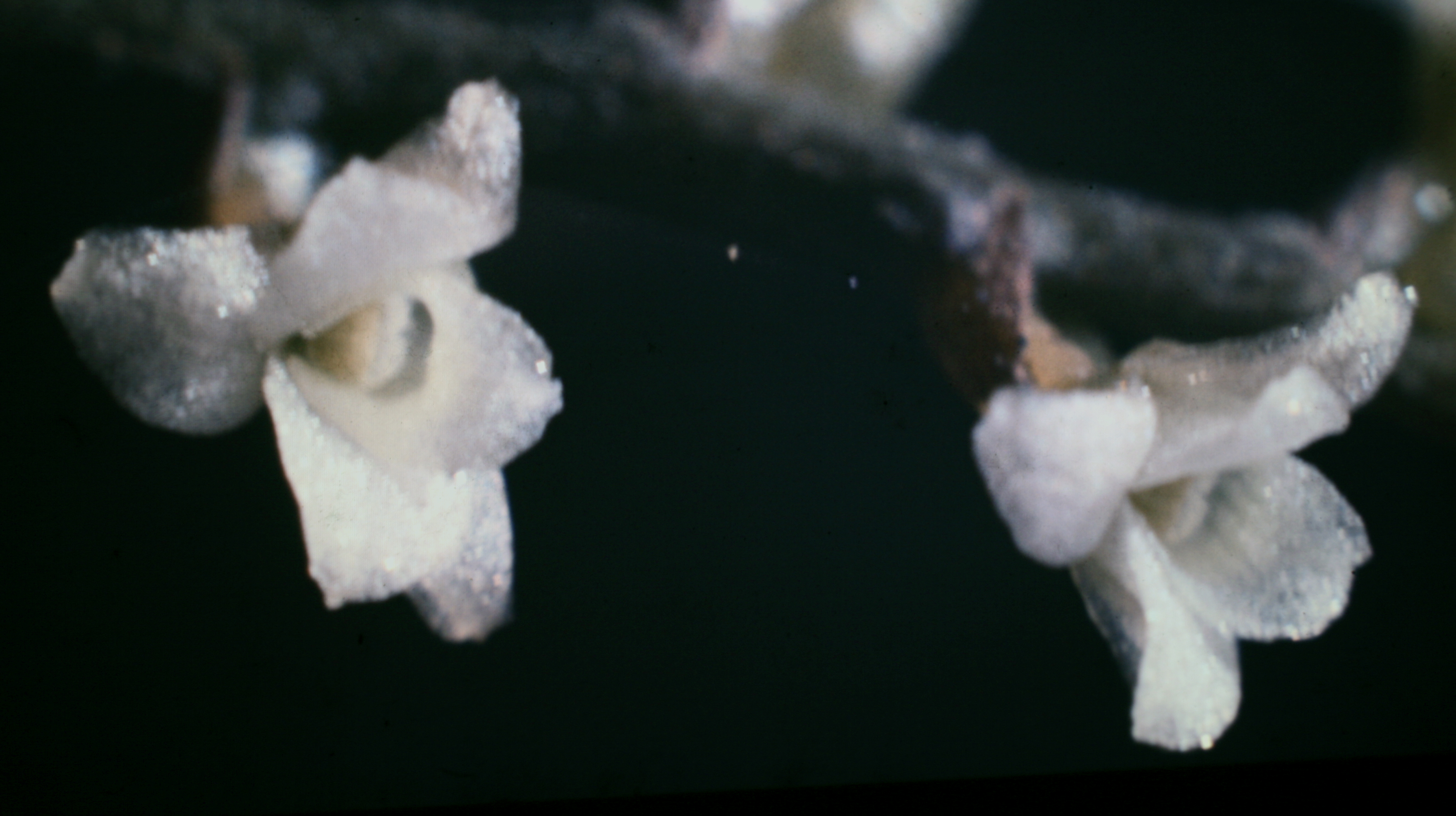

Scientific classification
- Kingdom: Plantae
- Clade: Tracheophytes
- Clade: Angiosperms
- Clade: Monocots
- Order: Asparagales
- Family: Orchidaceae
- Subfamily: Epidendroideae
- Genus: Campylocentrum
- Species: C. fasciola

Binomial name
- Campylocentrum fasciola (Lindl.) Cogn. (1906)

Synonyms
- Angraecum fasciola Lindl. (1840) (Basionym); Angraecum weigeltii Rchb.f. (1850); Aeranthes fascicola (Lindl.) Rchb.f. (1864); Campylocentrum sullivanii Fawc. & Rendle (1909); Campylocentrum loretoense Schltr. (1921); Campylocentrum lankesteri Ames (1923)

= Campylocentrum fasciola =

Species of orchid

Campylocentrum fasciola is a species of orchid. It occurs in a region ranging from southern Mexico (Chiapas and the Yucatán Peninsula) across Central America, the West Indies (Hispaniola, Jamaica, Puerto Rico, Trinidad-Tobago), and northern South America (Colombia, Venezuela, French Guiana, Guyana, Suriname, Peru, Ecuador, Bolivia, Brazil).
