= Campylocentrum insulare =

Scientific classification
- Kingdom: Plantae
- Clade: Tracheophytes
- Clade: Angiosperms
- Clade: Monocots
- Order: Asparagales
- Family: Orchidaceae
- Subfamily: Epidendroideae
- Genus: Campylocentrum
- Species: C. insulare

Binomial name
- Campylocentrum insulare C.E.Siqueira & E.M.Pessoa

Orchid species

Campylocentrum insulare is a very small species of orchid native to the island of Santa Catarina off the coast of Brazil and elsewhere in the Atlantic Forest. It bears the smallest flower of any known orchid at 0.5 millimetres in width. The flower is white with a yellow lip.

It is also leafless, with photosynthetic roots. It was discovered in 2015 by researcher Carlos Siqueira.
