= Velamen =

Term in plant morphology

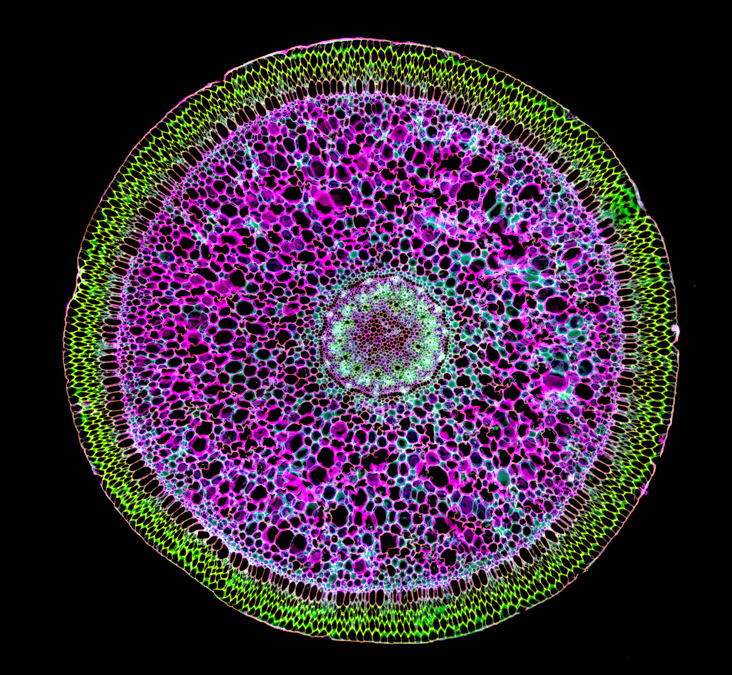
Transverse section through an aerial root of an orchid. The outer most layer is the velamen, comprising several cell layers of dead cells.

The velamen is a specialized root covering that acts like a natural sponge, found on orchids and many other plants. This thick, mesh-like layer replaces the normal root skin and is made up of dead cells that form tiny air pockets. While commonly associated with air-growing orchids that live on trees, this root covering is actually found in nearly 240 types of ground-dwelling plants as well, mostly within the monocot group. The velamen serves multiple functions including rapidly absorbing rainwater, temporarily storing moisture and nutrients, and protecting roots from damage when soil dries out and shrinks away. Laboratory studies have shown that it works as both a water reservoir and a selective filter, capturing nutrient-rich water from rainstorms and passing key minerals like phosphate and potassium to the living root tissues underneath.

== Structure and composition ==
The velamen (more precisely velamen radicum) is a spongy, multi-layered covering that surrounds the roots of certain plants, replacing the normal root skin. Its cells die when they mature, creating an empty mesh-like structure. Behind this lies a protective layer made of two types of cells: waterproof barrier cells mixed with living 'passage' cells that allow materials to pass through. Together these layers form a protective yet porous sleeve around the cortex. Although the exact thickness varies—from a single tier to more than twenty—the basic structure is remarkably similar across different plant families, suggesting they all evolved from the same ancestral root tissue through similar cell division patterns.

== Distribution ==
Contrary to the textbook image of velamentous roots being confined to epiphytic orchids, a literature survey recorded the tissue in almost 240 terrestrial genera. All but one of these belong to the monocots, with Orchidaceae contributing more than 160 genera; the rest are scattered through 22 additional families, especially within the Asparagales. When scientists mapped these findings onto the monocot family tree, they found velamen-bearing roots in eight of the eleven major plant groups, indicating at least twenty independent origins or repeated gains and losses over evolutionary time.

== Functions and evolutionary context ==
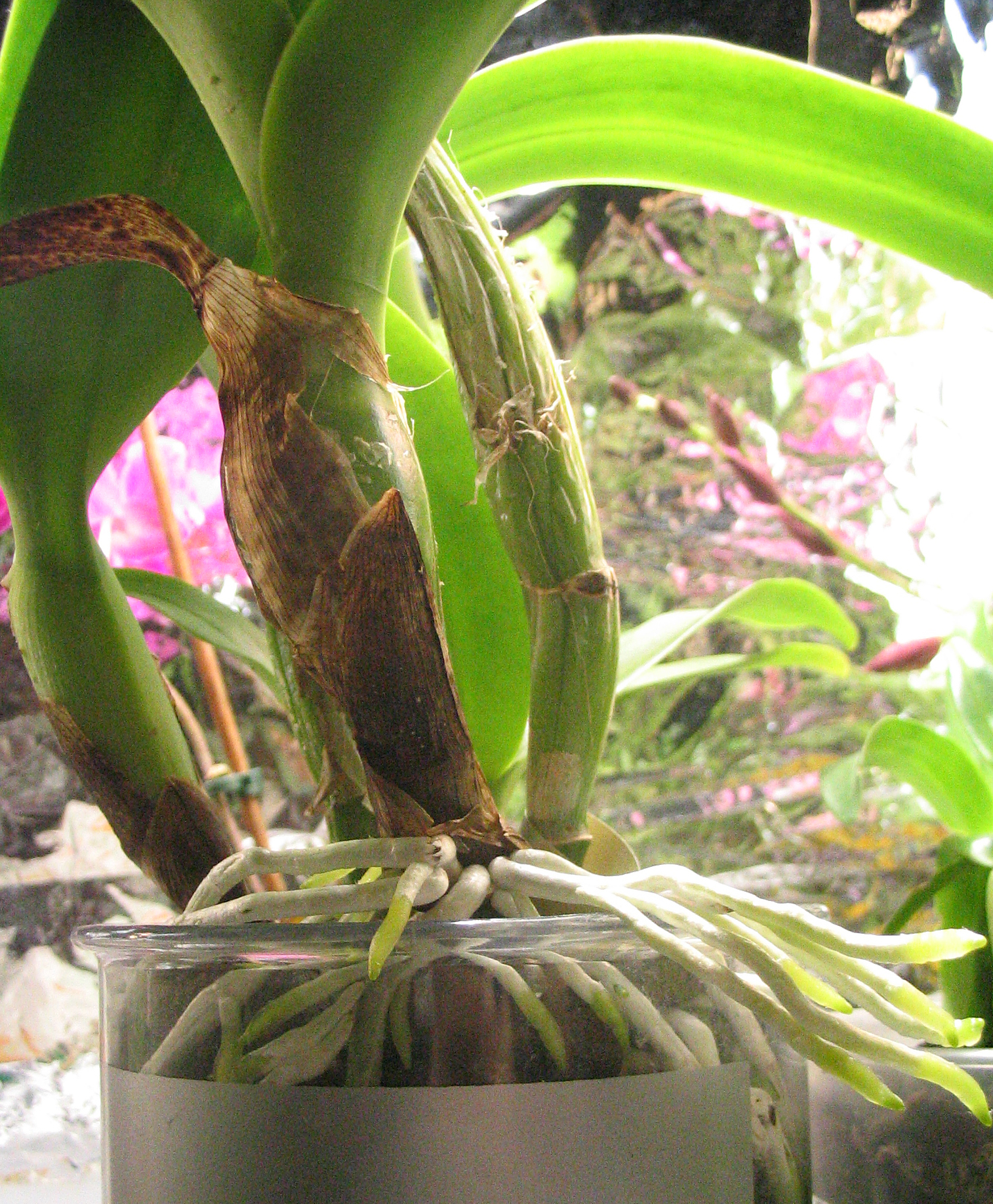
Aerial roots of Cattleya orchid showing the characteristic silvery-white velamen covering. The thick, spongy velamen gives these roots their distinctive appearance and enables rapid water absorption during rainfall.

Experiments on epiphytic orchids have linked the velamen to rapid uptake and temporary storage of rainfall, retention of nutrient-rich first-flush solutions, mechanical shielding of living tissues and even ultraviolet screening; however, quantitative evidence is still sparse and most studies treat these ideas as working hypotheses. In soil-rooted species its role is even less certain. One theory suggests that these dead, flexible layers protect the root from damage when dry soil shrinks and pulls away from it. This situation is common in Mediterranean climates and seasonally dry tropical areas where many plants with velamen grow.

The broad phylogenetic spread of the tissue suggests that a rudimentary velamen evolved on the ground and later served as a pre-adaptation for life in the canopy. Indeed, families containing both epiphytic and terrestrial members often show the structure in both lifestyles, while some exclusively epiphytic groups lack it altogether—evidence that available habitats, not just life form, shape its evolutionary trajectory.

== Water and nutrient-uptake dynamics ==
Early physiological work cast doubt on how much water a free-hanging velamen can supply. In a series of weighing trials on excised orchid roots, Dycus and Knudson (1957) reported that the tissue needed nearly two hours to reach full saturation in still air and then lost the absorbed water at roughly the same rate. Only the green apical 1–2 cm of a growing root absorbed appreciable moisture or phosphate; the mature, many-layered velamen farther back was "almost impermeable". Radioactive tracer phosphate applied to the wetted velamen failed to reach the leaves even after four days, leading the authors to conclude that an unattached aerial root is a liability rather than an asset under ordinary conditions.

A series of laboratory tests on aerial roots of Phalaenopsis and other orchids has confirmed that a dry velamen can absorb rain-borne solutions within seconds, whereas the liquid subsequently evaporates only over several hours, effectively turning the tissue into a temporary reservoir of moisture. The same experiments showed that the cell wall matrix acts as an ion-exchange filter: charged nutrients such as phosphate and potassium are held back, while uncharged molecules readily diffuse away.

Tracer studies revealed a two-phase uptake mechanism. The plant's nutrient uptake system works in two phases. First, high-efficiency transporters in the living root tissue quickly absorb nutrients when concentrations are low. When nutrient levels get higher, a second, less efficient system takes over. The high-affinity phase is energy-dependent—when researchers blocked the plant's energy-dependent transport system with a chemical inhibitor, nutrient uptake dropped by about 75%, proving that active energy is required for this process. Because the velamen captures the nutrient-rich "first flush" of a rainstorm and passes those ions on to active transporters, the data lend strong support to Went's long-standing hypothesis that the tissue evolved to secure pulse resources in the epiphytic habitat.
