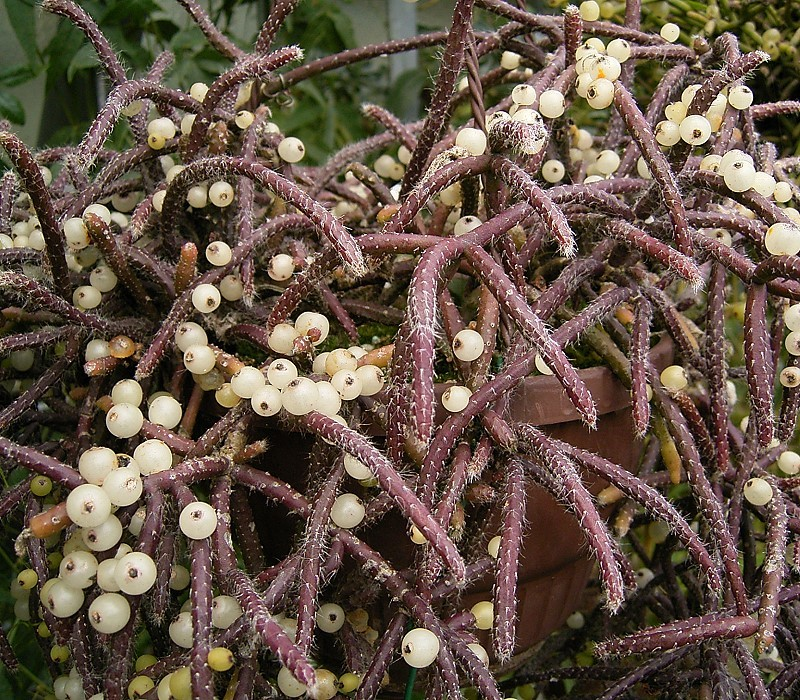

Conservation status
- Least Concern (IUCN 3.1)

Scientific classification
- Kingdom: Plantae
- Clade: Embryophytes
- Clade: Tracheophytes
- Clade: Spermatophytes
- Clade: Angiosperms
- Clade: Eudicots
- Order: Caryophyllales
- Family: Cactaceae
- Subfamily: Cactoideae
- Genus: Rhipsalis
- Species: R. baccifera

Binomial name
- Rhipsalis baccifera (J.S.Muell.) Stearn

Synonyms
- List: Cactus caripensis Kunth; Cactus cassythoides Moc. & Sessé ex DC.; Cactus fasciculatus Willd.; Cactus pendulus Sw.; Cactus quadrangularis Haw.; Cassytha baccifera J.S.Muell.; Cassytha filiformis Mill.; Cassytha polysperma Aiton ex Gaertn.; Cereus bacciferus (J.S.Muell.) Hemsl.; Cereus caripensis (Kunth) DC.; Cereus parasiticus Haw. ex Steud.; Cereus quadrangularis Pfeiff.; Hariota cassytha Cels ex C.F.Först.; Hariota cassytha Lem.; Hariota parasitica Kuntze; Hatiora fasciculata (Willd.) Kuntze; Rhipsalis bartlettii Clover; Rhipsalis bermejensis F. Ritter; Rhipsalis caripensis (Kunth) F.A.C. Weber; Rhipsalis cassytha Gaertn.; Rhipsalis cassythoides (Moc. & Sessé ex DC.) Don; Rhipsalis comorensis F.A.C.Weber; Rhipsalis coralloides Rauh; Rhipsalis delphinensis Barthlott; Rhipsalis fasciculata (Willd.) Haw.; Rhipsalis heptagona Rauh & Backeb.; Rhipsalis madagascariensis Weber ex Weber; Rhipsalis madagascariensis var. dasycerca F.A.C.Weber; Rhipsalis mauritiana (DC.) Barthlott; Rhipsalis mauritiana var. ellipticarpa Barthlott; Rhipsalis minutiflora K. Schum.; Rhipsalis parasitica (Lam.) Haw.; Rhipsalis parasiticus Haw.; Rhipsalis pendulina A. Berger; Rhipsalis pilosa F.A.C.Weber ex K.Schum.; Rhipsalis prismatica (Lem.) Rumpler; Rhipsalis saxicola Rauh; Rhipsalis suareziana F.A.C.Weber; Rhipsalis tetragona F.A.C.Weber

= Rhipsalis baccifera =

Species of cactus

Rhipsalis baccifera, commonly known as the mistletoe cactus, is an epiphytic cactus which originates in Central and South America, the Caribbean, and Florida. It is also found throughout the tropics of Africa and into Sri Lanka. This is the only cactus species naturally occurring outside the Americas. One hypothesis is that it was introduced to the Old World by migratory birds, long enough ago for the Old World populations to be regarded as distinct subspecies. An alternative hypothesis holds that the species initially crossed the Atlantic Ocean on European ships trading between South America and Africa, after which birds may have spread it more widely.

== Taxonomy ==
The species shows considerable polymorphism and can be divided into numerous subspecies. Mesoamerican specimens are usually tetraploid and South American specimens are diploid. The genera currently assigned to the tribe Rhipsalideae (which include Hatiora, Lepismium, and Schlumbergera in addition to Rhipsalis) were subject to considerable confusion and disagreement prior to the clarification by Wilhelm Barthlott and Nigel Taylor in 1995.

== Gallery ==
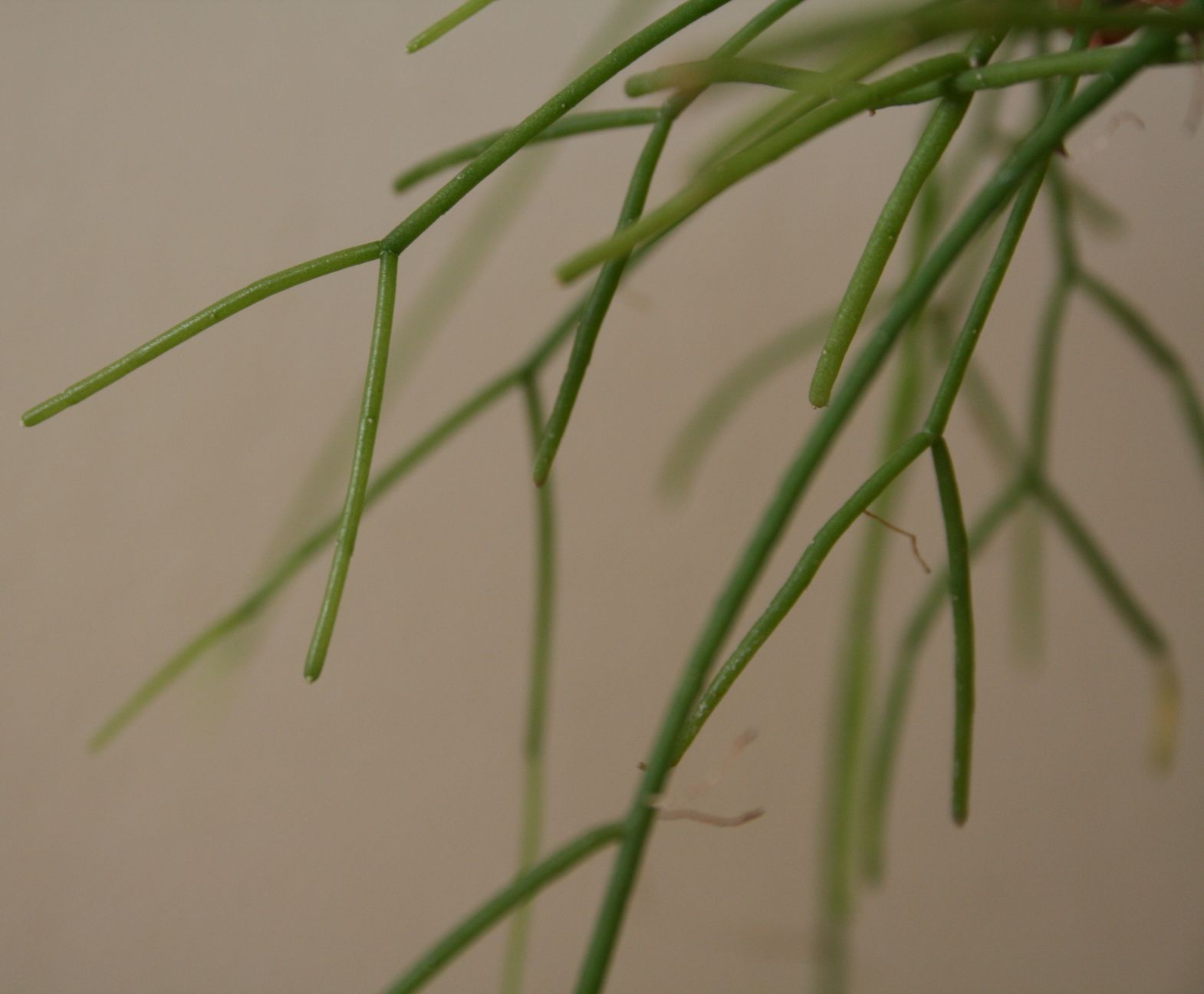
Branches

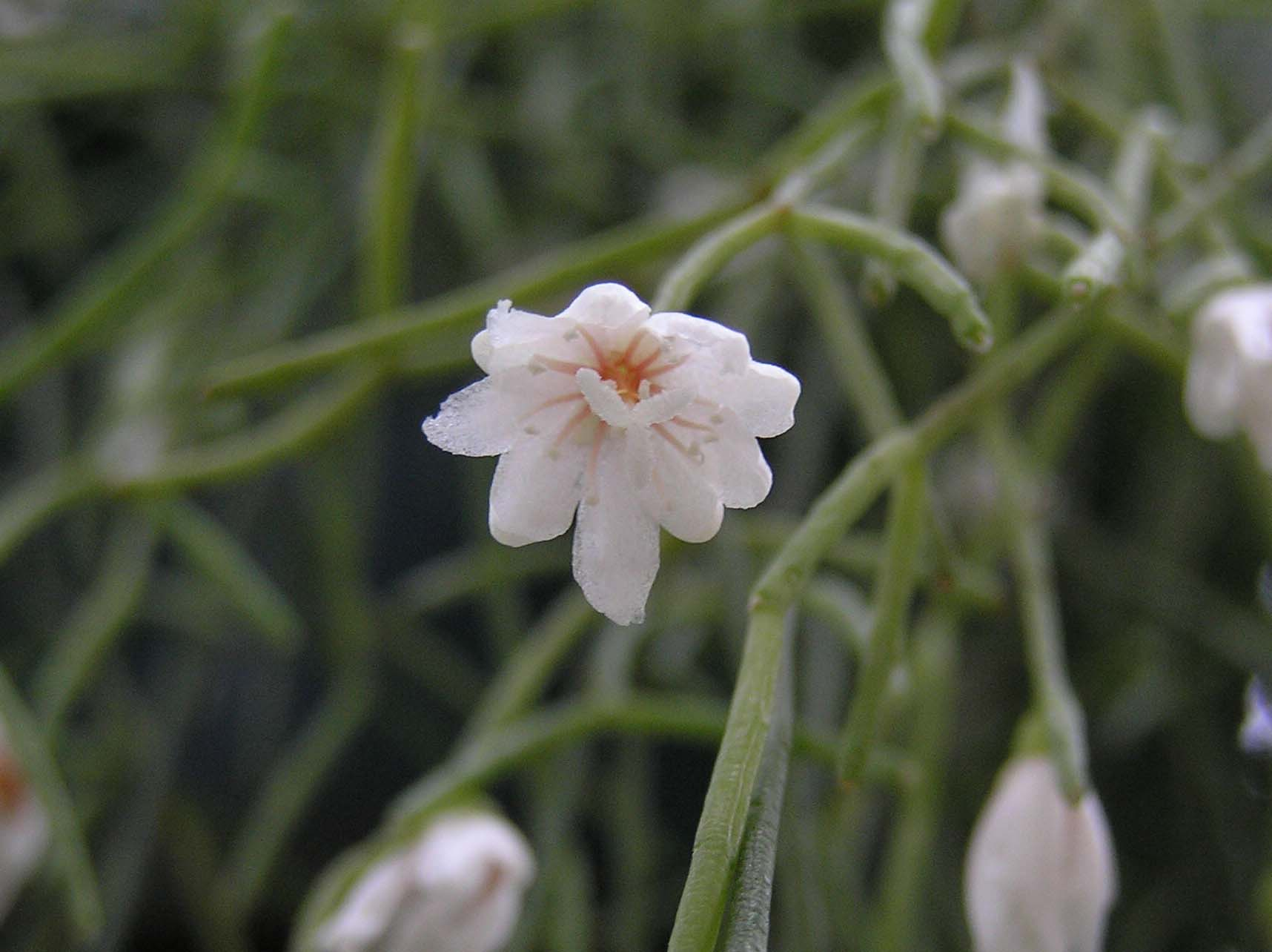
Flower

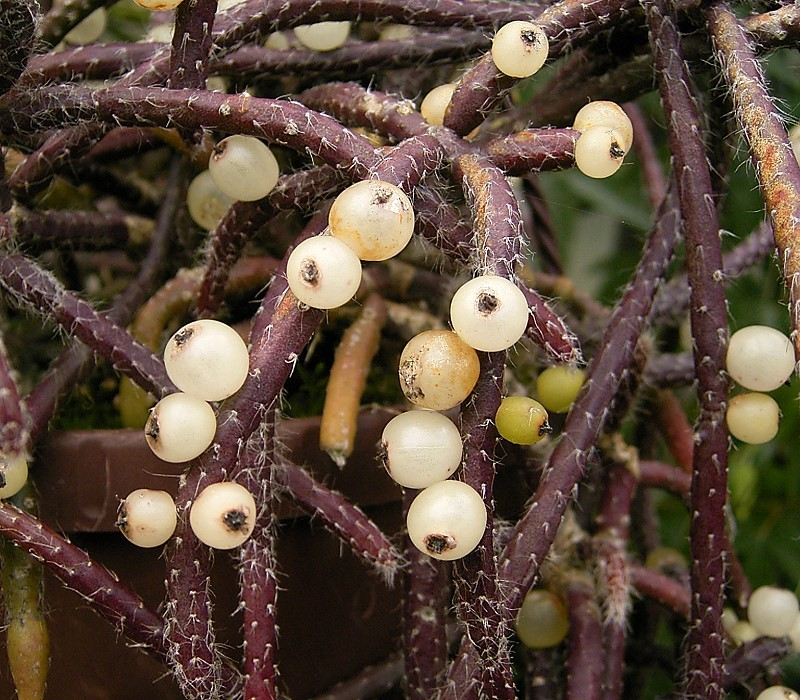
Fruit

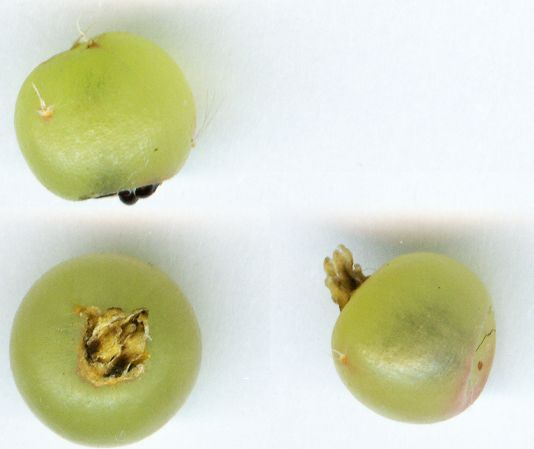
Fruit
