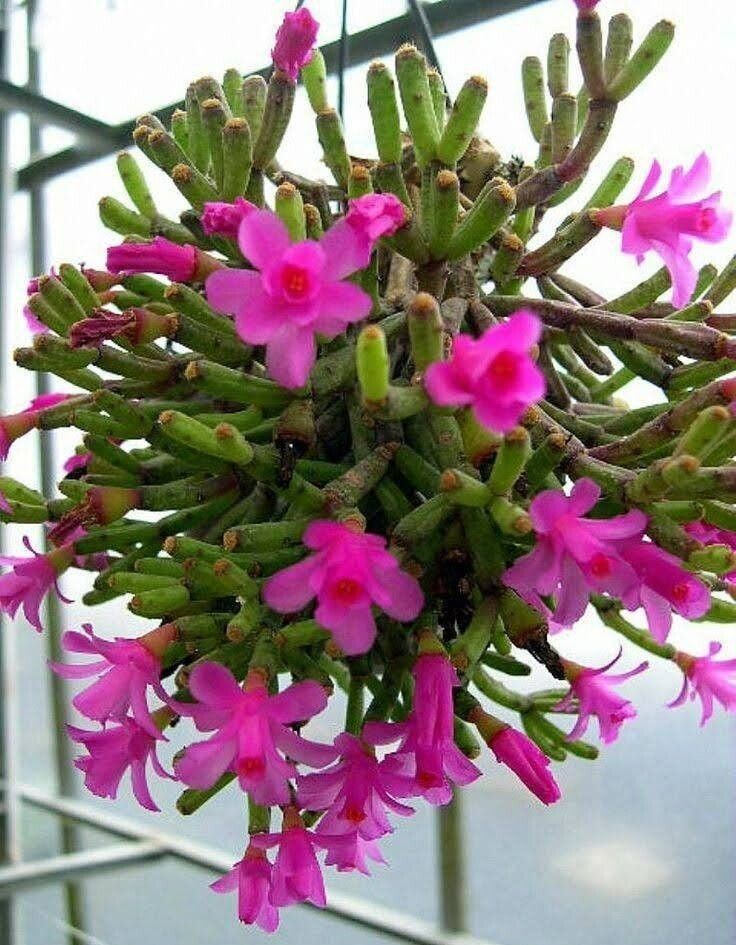

Conservation status
- Endangered (IUCN 3.1)

Scientific classification
- Kingdom: Plantae
- Clade: Tracheophytes
- Clade: Angiosperms
- Clade: Eudicots
- Order: Caryophyllales
- Family: Cactaceae
- Subfamily: Cactoideae
- Genus: Hatiora
- Species: H. herminiae

Binomial name
- Hatiora herminiae (Porto & A.Cast.) Backeb. ex Barthlott

Synonyms
- Hariota herminiae Porto & A.Cast.; Rhipsalis herminiae (Porto & A.Cast.) Kimnach

= Hatiora herminiae =

Species of cactus

Hatiora herminiae is a species of flowering plant in the tribe Rhipsalideae, family Cactaceae. It grows as an epiphyte in cloud forests in Southeast Brazil.

== Description ==
Hatiora herminiae is an epiphyte, growing up to about 30 cm (12 in) high, either upright or arching over. The stems are circular in cross-section, not ribbed, and are composed of segments 2–5 cm (0.8–2.0 in) long and 5 mm (0.2 in) in diameter. Branches occur at the ends of segments. Pink to magenta flowers are borne from areoles at the ends of stems, and are up to 2 cm (0.8 in) long, opening to 2.5 cm (1.0 in) across. Olive green berries follow the flowers.

== Taxonomy ==
The species was first described in 1940 by Paulo Campos Porto and Alberto Castellanos, as Hariota herminiae. Confusion over the status of the genus name Hariota later led to its replacement by the anagram Hatiora. Like many species in the Rhipsalideae, it has also been placed in the genus Rhipsalis. Molecular phylogenetic studies have firmly placed it in Hatiora.

== Distribution and habitat ==
Hatiora herminiae is endemic to Southeast Brazil, where it is found in the states of Minas Gerais and São Paulo. It grows as an epiphyte, particularly on Araucaria, in cloud forests in the Serra da Mantiqueira at elevations of around 1,500–2,000 m (4,900–6,600 ft).

== Conservation ==
When assessed in 2010, it was considered to be endangered, the main threat being collection for its attractive flowers, but it was also threatened by declines in habitat.
