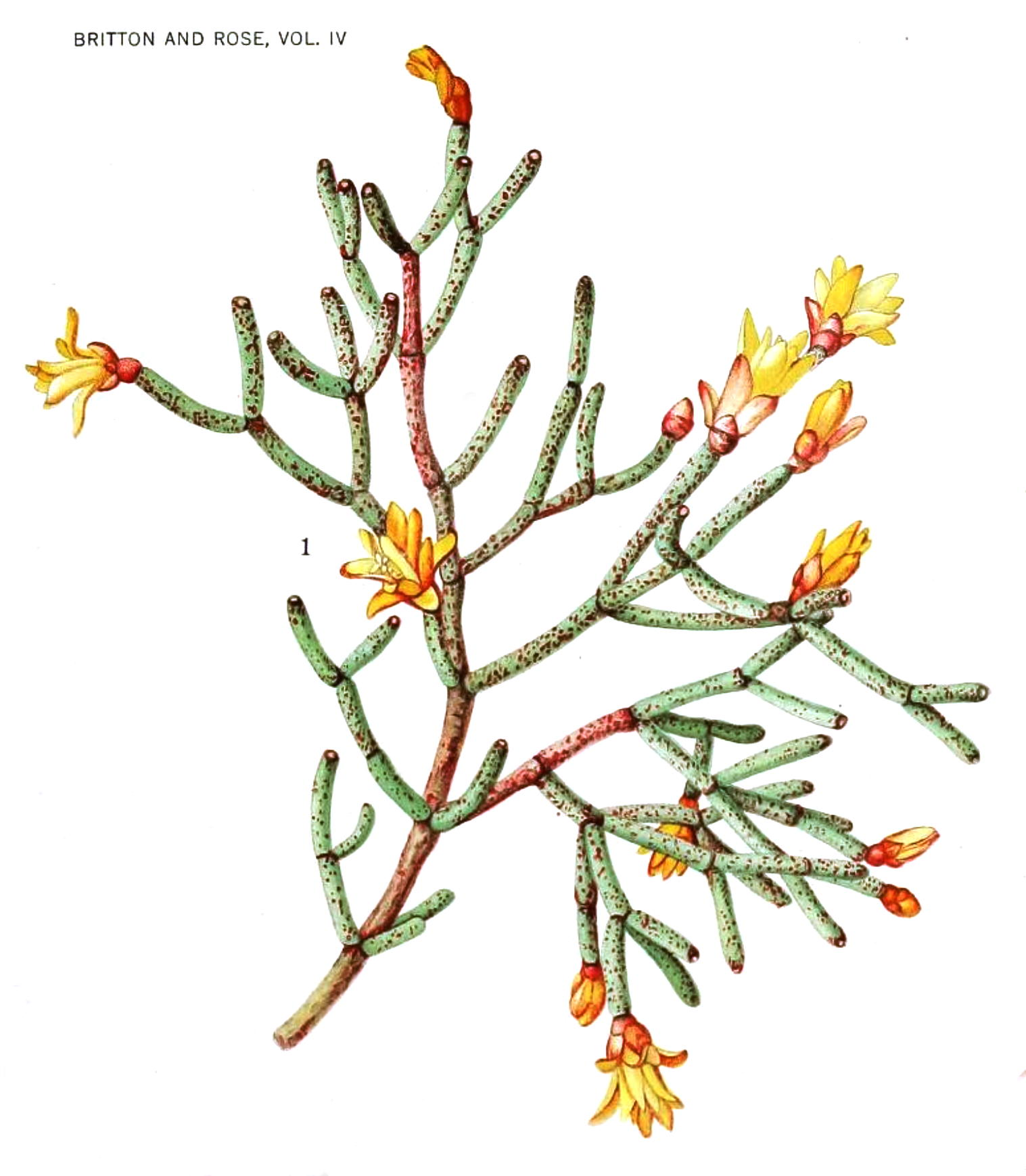
- Illustration from The Cactaceae

Conservation status
- Endangered (IUCN 3.1)

Scientific classification
- Kingdom: Plantae
- Clade: Tracheophytes
- Clade: Angiosperms
- Clade: Eudicots
- Order: Caryophyllales
- Family: Cactaceae
- Subfamily: Cactoideae
- Genus: Hatiora
- Species: H. cylindrica

Binomial name
- Hatiora cylindrica Britton & Rose

Synonyms
- Hariota cylindrica (Britton & Rose) A.Berger; Hatiora salicornoides f. cylindrica (Britton & Rose) Süpplie; Rhipsalis salicornoides var. cylindrica (Britton & Rose) Kimnach

= Hatiora cylindrica =

Species of cactus

Hatiora cylindrica is a species of often epiphytic cactus in the tribe Rhipsalideae within the subfamily Cactoideae. It is native to east Brazil, where it grows in a variety of habitats, including moist forest, dunes and coastal rocks.

== Description ==
Hatiora cylindrica is closely related to Hatiora salicornoides, and has been included within that species. Like H. salicornoides, it is a leafless perennial with many branched green stems made up of individual segments. These are strictly cylindrical as opposed to bottle-shaped in H. salicornoides. Its flowers, borne at the end of the stems, have many yellow to orange petals and open quite widely. They are followed by white fruits.

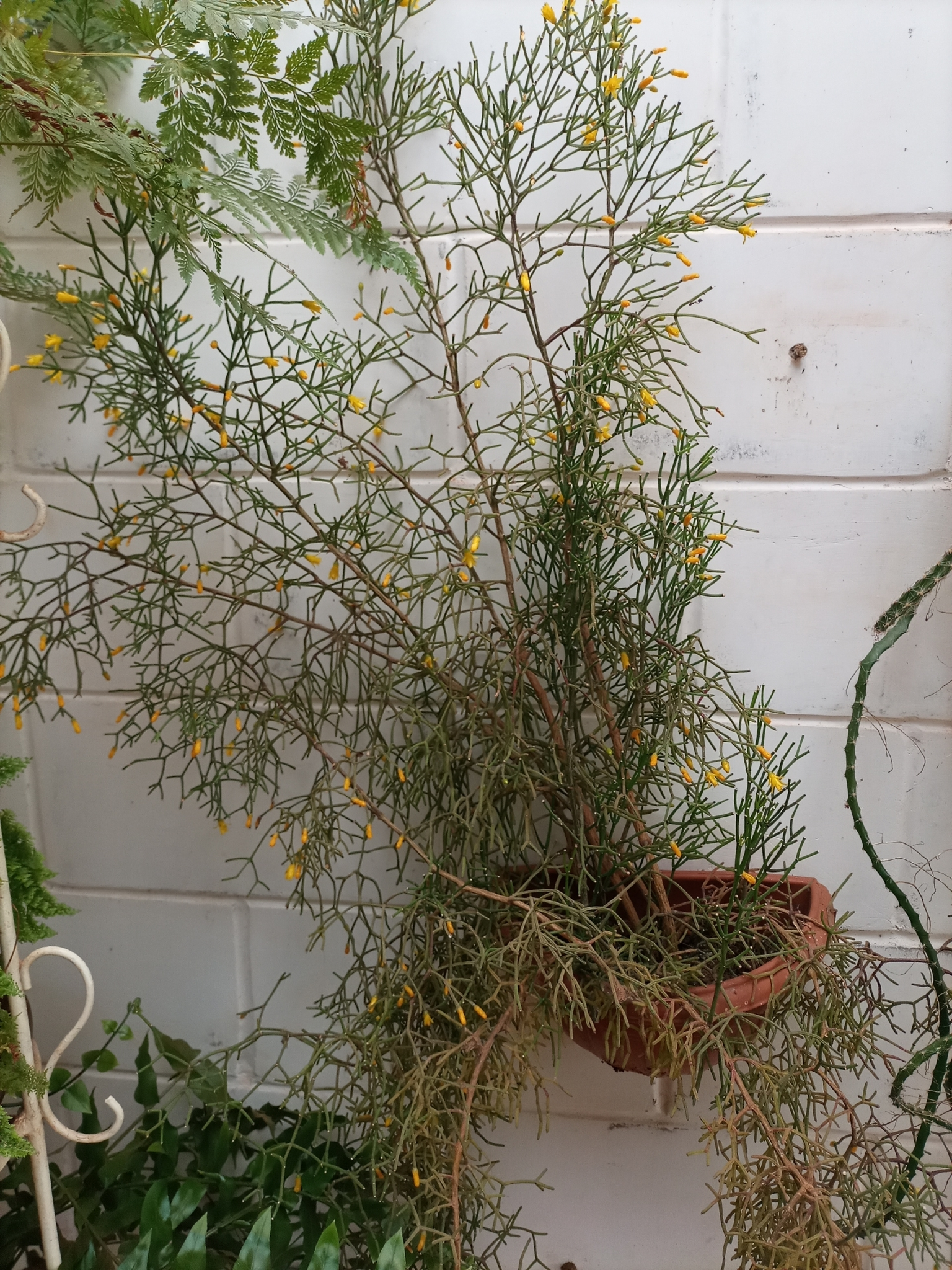
In cultivation

== Taxonomy ==
Hatiora cylindrica was first described by Nathaniel Britton and Joseph Rose in 1923. It has not always been viewed as a separate species, being included in H. salicornoides as either the form or the variety cylindrica. Molecular phylogenetic studies have confirmed its placement in the genus and in the tribe Rhipsalideae, and also shown that it is closely related to H. salicornoides (which may include some other distinct species).

== Distribution and habitat ==
Hatiora cylindrica is native to Bahia in Northeast Brazil, and Minas Gerais and Rio de Janeiro in Southeast Brazil. It may also be present in Espírito Santo, also in Southeast Brazil. It is found from sea level to elevations of 1,200 m (3,900 ft). It grows as an epiphyte, in the ground and probably as a lithophyte in a variety of habitats, including humid forests, sand dunes and coastal rocks.

== Conservation ==
When assessed in 2010, it was considered to be endangered. It occurred in five localities, only one of which was protected. The main threat was a decline in its habitat caused by deforestation as a result of expanding tourism, agriculture and development.
