= Hariota =

Hariota is a synonym for two different genera:

- Hariota DC. is a synonym of Hatiora
- Hariota Adans. is a synonym of Rhipsalis
