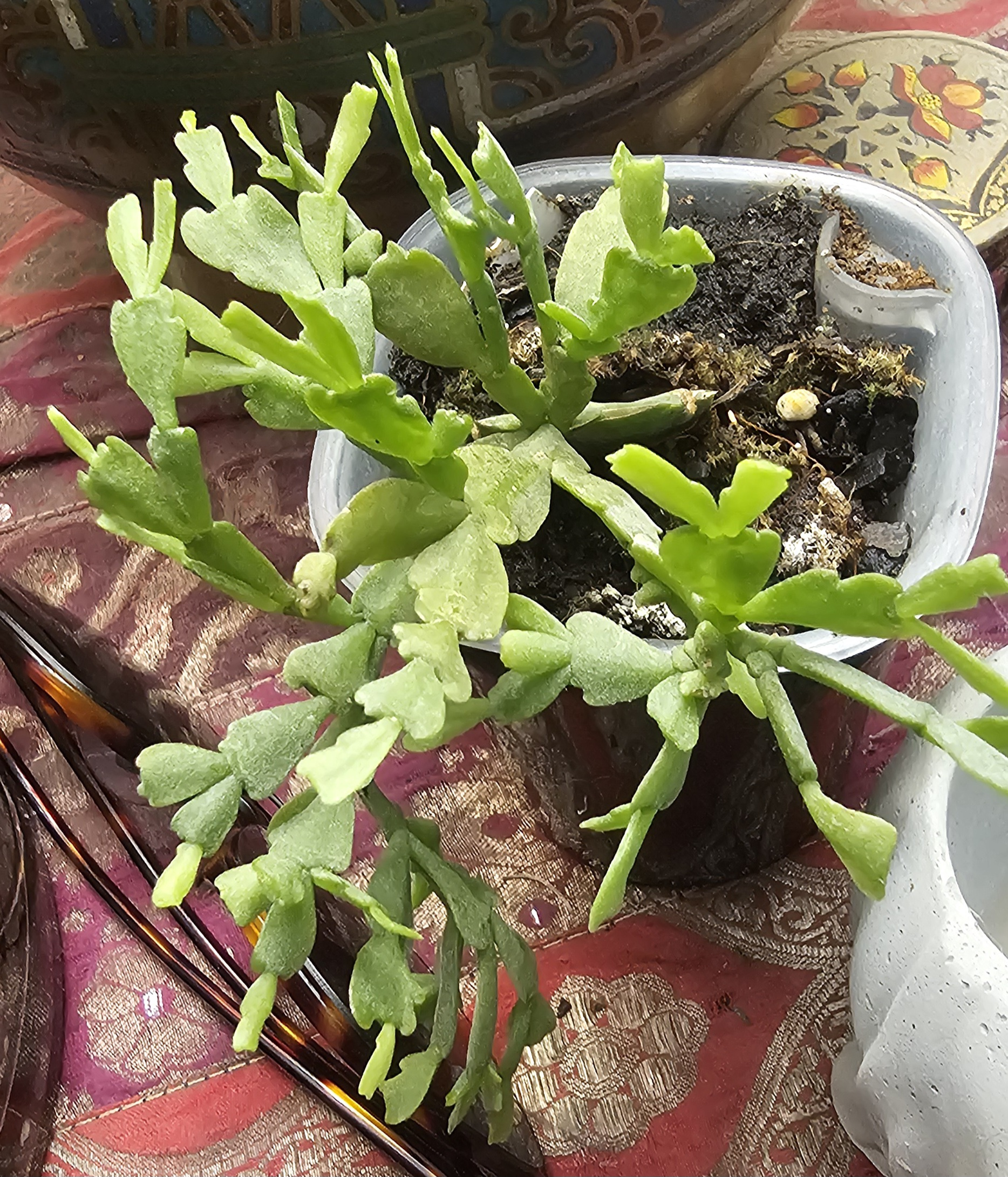
- Schlumbergera lutea subsp. lutea in cultivation as a houseplant

Conservation status
- Endangered (IUCN 3.1)

Scientific classification
- Kingdom: Plantae
- Clade: Tracheophytes
- Clade: Angiosperms
- Clade: Eudicots
- Order: Caryophyllales
- Family: Cactaceae
- Subfamily: Cactoideae
- Tribe: Rhipsalideae
- Genus: Schlumbergera
- Species: S. lutea

Binomial name
- Schlumbergera lutea Calvente & Zappi

Synonyms
- Hariota epiphylloides (Porto & Werderm.) Porto & A.Cast.; Hatiora epiphylloides (Porto & Werderm.) P.V.Heath; Pseudozygocactus epiphylloides (Porto & Werderm.) Backeb.; Rhipsalis epiphylloides Porto & Werderm.

= Schlumbergera lutea =

Species of cactus

Schlumbergera lutea, synonym Hatiora epiphylloides, is a species of flowering plant in the family Cactaceae, subfamily Cactoideae, native to southeast Brazil. It is a shrubby epiphyte, with flattened stems and bright yellow flowers.

== Description ==
Schlumbergera lutea is an epiphyte, with a shrubby growth habit and often pendant stems. The stems are made up of somewhat triangular segments, 2–3 cm (0.8–1.2 in) long and up to 1.5 cm (0.6 in) wide. It has very small areoles that are without spines. The flowers are bright yellow, 1–2 cm (0.4–0.8 in) long.

== Taxonomy ==
The species was first described in 1935, as Rhipsalis epiphylloides. It was transferred to the genus Hatiora in 1983. The generic boundaries within the tribe to which it belongs, Rhipsalideae, have long been unclear. On the basis of a molecular phylogenetic study in 2011, the species was transferred to the genus Schlumbergera. Since the name "Schlumbergera epiphylloides" had already been used for a different species, Calvente and Zappi published the replacement name Schlumbergera lutea. There are two subspecies, S. l. bradei and S. l. lutea.

== Distribution ==
Schlumbergera lutea is found in southeast Brazil, around Rio de Janeiro and São Paulo.
