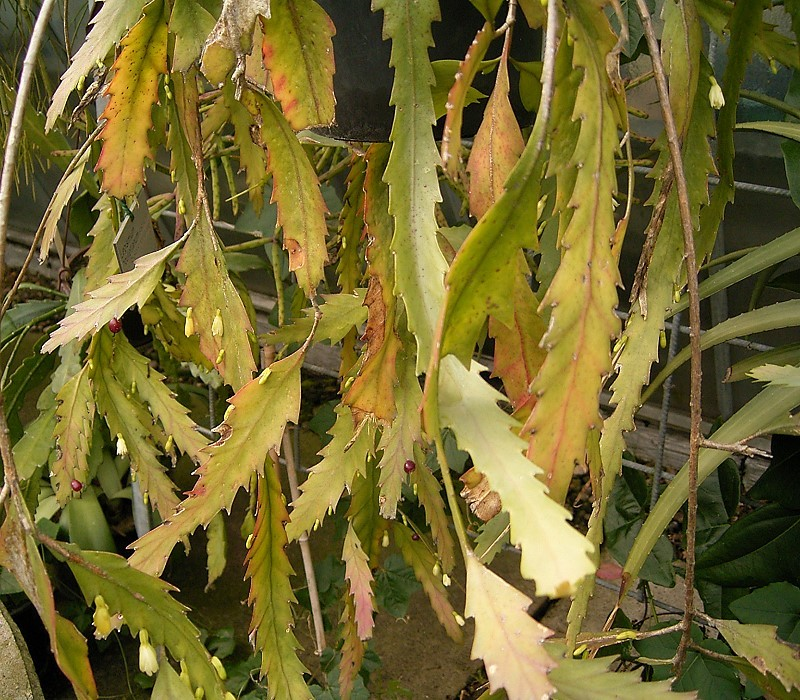

Conservation status
- Least Concern (IUCN 3.1)

Scientific classification
- Kingdom: Plantae
- Clade: Tracheophytes
- Clade: Angiosperms
- Clade: Eudicots
- Order: Caryophyllales
- Family: Cactaceae
- Subfamily: Cactoideae
- Genus: Lepismium
- Species: L. houlletianum

Binomial name
- Lepismium houlletianum (Lemaire) Barthlott

= Lepismium houlletianum =

Species of cactus

Lepismium houlletianum is a species of plant in the family Cactaceae. It is found in Argentina, Brazil, and possibly Bolivia. Its natural habitats are subtropical or tropical moist lowland forest and subtropical or tropical moist montane forest. It is threatened by habitat loss.
