= Lepismium lorentzianum =

Conservation status
- Least Concern (IUCN 3.1)

Scientific classification
- Kingdom: Plantae
- Clade: Tracheophytes
- Clade: Angiosperms
- Clade: Eudicots
- Order: Caryophyllales
- Family: Cactaceae
- Subfamily: Cactoideae
- Genus: Lepismium
- Species: L. lorentzianum

Binomial name
- Lepismium lorentzianum (Griseb.) Barthlott

Synonyms
- Nothorhipsalis lorentziana (Griseb.) Doweld; Rhipsalis lorentziana Griseb. (basionym)

Species of plant

Lepismium lorentzianum is a species of succulent flowering plant in the genus Lepismium, within the family Cactaceae. It is native to northwestern Argentina and southern Bolivia.

== Description ==
Lepismium lorentzianum is a species of shrubby, abundantly-branching epiphytic cactus. Its stems are divided into segments which may be flattened or with 3 ribs, with undulate or crenate margins. The segments measure 10 to 30 cm in length and 2 to 4 cm in width, and are vivid green in color with a prominent central vein.

The leaves are reduced to small, rudimentary scales, which are visible around the areoles. The areoles are located in the notches of the stem's margins; they are not significantly sunken, and have a woolly covering, but no bristles or spines.

Plant with flowers and developing fruits

The flowers are solitary and pendant. They are campanulate to funnel-shaped, and are white-yellow in color. The pericarpel has 4 angles and a smooth surface.

The fruits develop a slightly angular shape (with 4 angles, as with the pericarpel), and become purple in color as they mature.

== Distribution and habitat ==
Lepismium lorentzianum is native to northwestern Argentina, in the provinces of Jujuy, Salta, and Tucumán, as well as in southern Bolivia, in the departments of Santa Cruz, Chuquisaca, and Tarija.

This species primarily inhabits the seasonally-dry tropical biome, at altitudes from 500 to 2000 meters above sea level. In Bolivia, it grows as an epiphyte in forests in the Yungas ecoregion, where it grows on trees in humid mountainous environments.

== Taxonomy ==
This species was first described as Rhipsalis lorentziana, a name published in 1879 by the German botanist August Heinrich Rudolf Grisebach in the scientific journal Abhandlungen der Königlichen Gesellschaft der Wissenschaften zu Göttingen 24: 139.

Later, the German botanist Wilhelm Barthlott moved the species to the genus Lepismium, renaming it Lepismium lorentzianum. He registered these changes in the scientific journal Bradleya 5: 99, published in 1987.

Etymology

- Lepismium: The genus name comes from the Greek lepisma (meaning "scale" or "peel") and the Latin suffix -ium, which is frequently used in botanical genus names. This name refers to the small, rudimentary, scale-like leaves found around the areoles of this genus' species. Some sources also interpret this as referring to the way in which the flower buds emerge from the epidermis, giving a characteristic scaly appearance to some species of Lepismium.
- lorentzianum: the specific epithet honors the German-Argentinian botanist Pablo Günther Lorentz for his contributions to the study of the flora of South America.

== Conservation status ==
On the IUCN Red List, Lepismium lorentzianum is classified as being of Least Concern (LC). This signifies that it is currently at low risk of extinction due to its wide geographic distribution and lack of known significant threats to its survival, even though it is considered to be a rare species.

== Cultivation ==
This species is primarily cultivated as an ornamental, and it may be propagated via cuttings.

== Gallery ==
Plant growing as an epiphyte on a tree trunk; in habitat in Ledesma, Jujuy, Argentina

Plant in flower

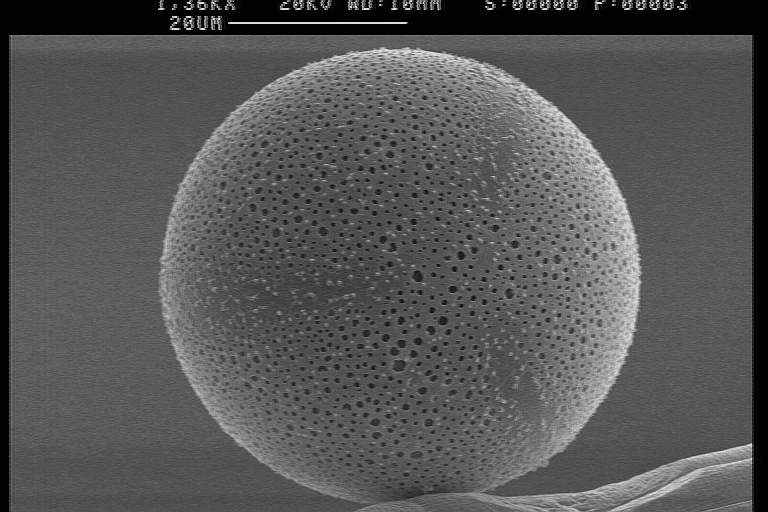
Pollen grain under an electron microscope

Plant with developing fruits

Illustration, ca. 1943
