= Lepismium lumbricoides =

- In habitat in Soriano Department, Uruguay

Conservation status
- Least Concern (IUCN 3.1)

Scientific classification
- Kingdom: Plantae
- Clade: Tracheophytes
- Clade: Angiosperms
- Clade: Eudicots
- Order: Caryophyllales
- Family: Cactaceae
- Subfamily: Cactoideae
- Genus: Lepismium
- Species: L. lumbricoides

Binomial name
- Lepismium lumbricoides (Lem.) Barthlott, 1987

Synonyms
- Cereus lumbricoides Lem.; Ophiorhipsalis lumbricoides (Lem.) Doweld; Rhipsalis lumbricoides (Lem.) Lem.; Hariota lumbricalis Kuntze; Hariota sarmentacea Kuntze; Lepismium aculeatum (F.A.C.Weber) Barthlott; Lepismium lumbricoides f. aculeatum (F.A.C.Weber) Barthlott & N.P.Taylor; Ophiorhipsalis lumbricoides subsp. aculeata (F.A.C.Weber) Doweld; Rhipsalis aculeata F.A.C.Weber; Rhipsalis bauchienii Guillaumin & Poup.; Rhipsalis leucorhaphis K.Schum.; Rhipsalis loefgrenii Britton & Rose; Rhipsalis lumbricoides var. aculeata (F.A.C.Weber) Kimnach; Rhipsalis lumbricoides var. leucorhaphis (K.Schum.) F.Ritter; Rhipsalis novaesii Gürke; Rhipsalis sarmentacea Otto & A.Dietr.

Species of plant

Lepismium lumbricoides, commonly known in Spanish as sueldaconsuelda, is a species of succulent flowering plant in the genus Lepismium, within the family Cactaceae. It is native to Argentina, Bolivia, southern and southeastern Brazil, Paraguay, and Uruguay.

== Description ==
Lepismium lumbricoides is a species of epiphytic cactus with a shrubby habit and abundant branching. It climbs on trees, to which it attaches itself using aerial roots. The stems are divided into cylindrical segments, without wings, prominent ribs, or flattening, and are gray-green to yellow-green in color. They can grow to over 1 meter long, and reach 4-8 mm in diameter.

The cylindrical stems of Lepismium lumbricoides

The flowers of Lepismium lumbricoides

The leaves are reduced to small, rudimentary scales visible around the areoles. The areoles are situated very closely together and possess short, white, woolly trichomes, as well as 5-8 rigid spines that are 3-5 cm long; these usually fall off over time. The flowers grow laterally to the stems and are radially symmetrical.They are white to yellowish in color, and can grow to be 2.2 cm long and 3-4 cm across. The hypanthium is scaleless and spineless. The fruits are globular in shape. They are green when developing and become purple when ripe.

== Distribution and habitat ==
Lepismium lumbricoides is native to a large area of central South America. In Argentina, it is found in the provinces of Buenos Aires, Catamarca, Chaco, Corrientes, Entre Ríos, Formosa, Jujuy, Misiones, Salta, Santiago del Estero, and Tucumán. In Bolivia, it is found in the departments of Beni, La Paz, and Santa Cruz. In Brazil, it is found in the south and southeast of the country, specifically in the states of Paraná, Rio Grande do Sul, Santa Catarina, and São Paulo. It is also found in Paraguay and Uruguay.

This species mainly inhabits the dry tropical biome, and is found from sea level to 1900 m in altitude. It grows as an epiphyte, adhering to the trunks and branches of trees using aerial roots. In this way, it can take advantage of environmental humidity and light without being entirely dependent on the soil.

== Taxonomy ==
This species was first described as Cereus lumbricoides, published in 1839 by French botanist Charles Lemaire in his book Cactearum Genera Nova Speciesque Novae.

Later, German botanist Wilhelm Barthlott transferred the species to the genus Lepismium, and it was renamed Lepismium lumbricoides. He registered these changes in the scientific journal Bradleya 5: 99, published in 1987.

Etymology

- Lepismium: The genus name comes from the Greek lepisma (meaning "scale" or "peel") and the Latin suffix -ium, which is frequently used in botanical genus names. This name refers to the small, rudimentary, scale-like leaves found around the areoles of this genus' species. Some sources also interpret this as referring to the way in which the flower buds emerge from the epidermis, giving a characteristic scaly appearance to some species of Lepismium.
- lumbricoides: The specific epithet comes from the Latin lumbricus (meaning "worm") and the Greek oeidēs (meaning "similar to" or "resembling"). This name refers to this species' long and thin stems, which appear worm-like in shape.

== Conservation status ==
On the IUCN Red List, this species is classified as Least Concern, meaning that there is currently a low risk of its extinction on a global scale.

This species has large populations and a wide geographic distribution, factors which contribute to its stability and reduce its vulnerability to local environmental changes. Furthermore, there are currently no known significant threats that directly affect its populations or the conservation of its habitat.

== Uses ==
This species is mainly cultivated as an ornamental plant, and it can be propagated vegetatively via cuttings.

== Gallery ==
Plant growing as an epiphyte on a tree trunk

Plant in flower

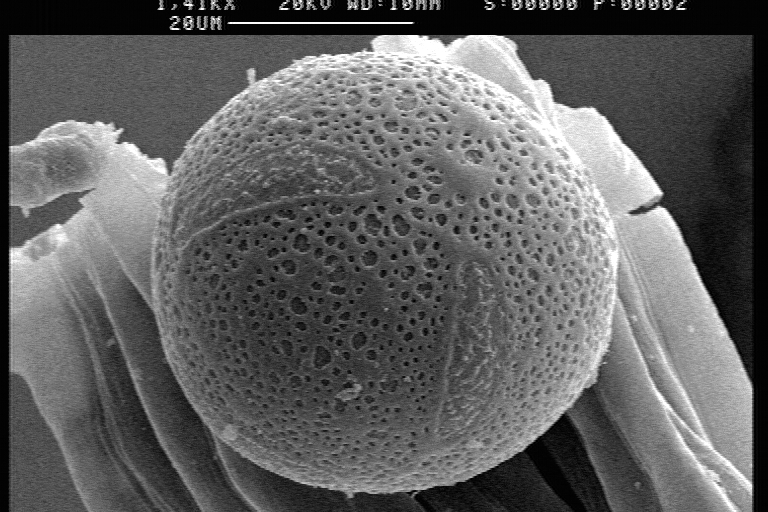
A pollen grain of Lepismium lumbricoides, seen under an electron microscope

Developing fruits

Mature fruits
