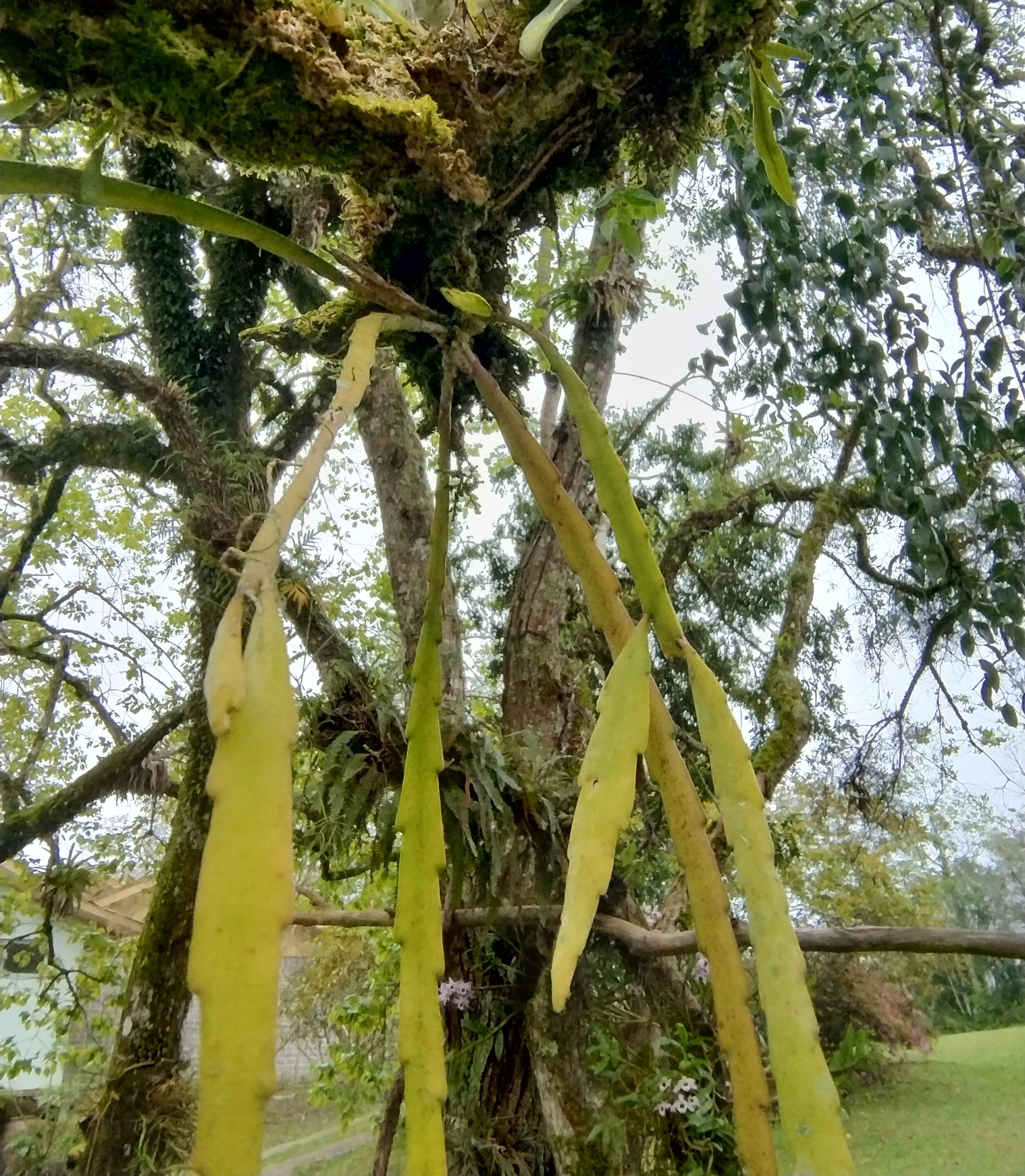

Conservation status
- Least Concern (IUCN 3.1)

Scientific classification
- Kingdom: Plantae
- Clade: Tracheophytes
- Clade: Angiosperms
- Clade: Eudicots
- Order: Caryophyllales
- Family: Cactaceae
- Subfamily: Cactoideae
- Genus: Lepismium
- Species: L. warmingianum

Binomial name
- Lepismium warmingianum (K.Schum) Barthlott

= Lepismium warmingianum =

Species of cactus

Lepismium warmingianum is a species of plant in the family Cactaceae. It is found in Argentina, Brazil, and Paraguay. Its natural habitat is subtropical or tropical moist lowland forests. It is threatened by habitat loss.
