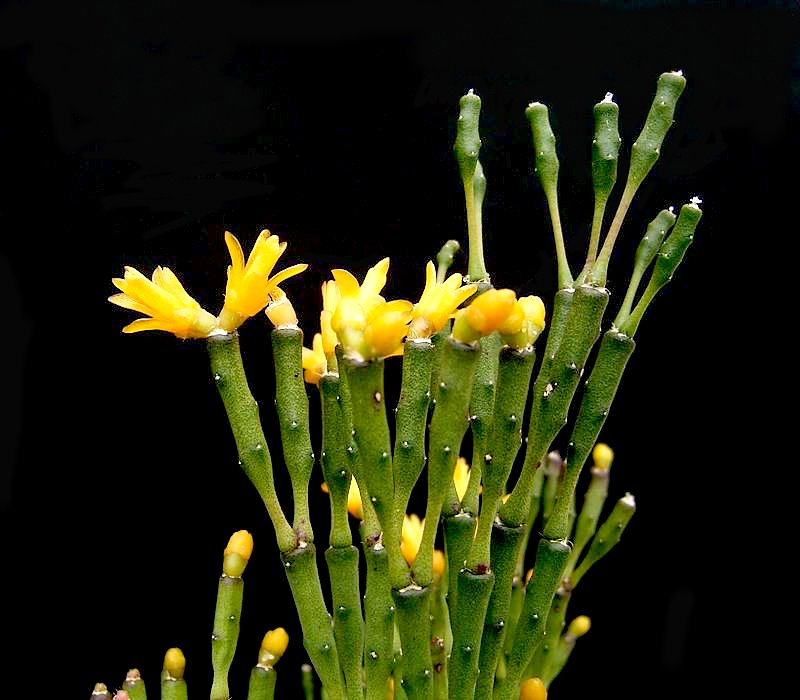

Conservation status
- Least Concern (IUCN 3.1)

Scientific classification
- Kingdom: Plantae
- Clade: Tracheophytes
- Clade: Angiosperms
- Clade: Eudicots
- Order: Caryophyllales
- Family: Cactaceae
- Subfamily: Cactoideae
- Genus: Hatiora
- Species: H. salicornoides

Binomial name
- Hatiora salicornoides (Haw.) Britton & Rose

Synonyms
- Cactus lyratus Vell.; Cactus salicornoides (Haw.) Steud.; Cactus trichotomus Ten.; Hariota bambusoides F.A.C.Weber; Hariota clavata var. deliculata (Loefgr.) A.Cast.; Hariota salicornoides (Haw.) DC.; Hariota stricta (F.A.C.Weber) K.Schum.; Hariota villigera K.Schum.; Hatiora bambusoides Britton & Rose; Rhipsalis bambusoides F.A.C.Weber; Rhipsalis gracilis F.A.C.Weber; Rhipsalis salicornoides Haw.; Rhipsalis villigera (K.Schum.) Orcutt

= Hatiora salicornoides =

Species of cactus

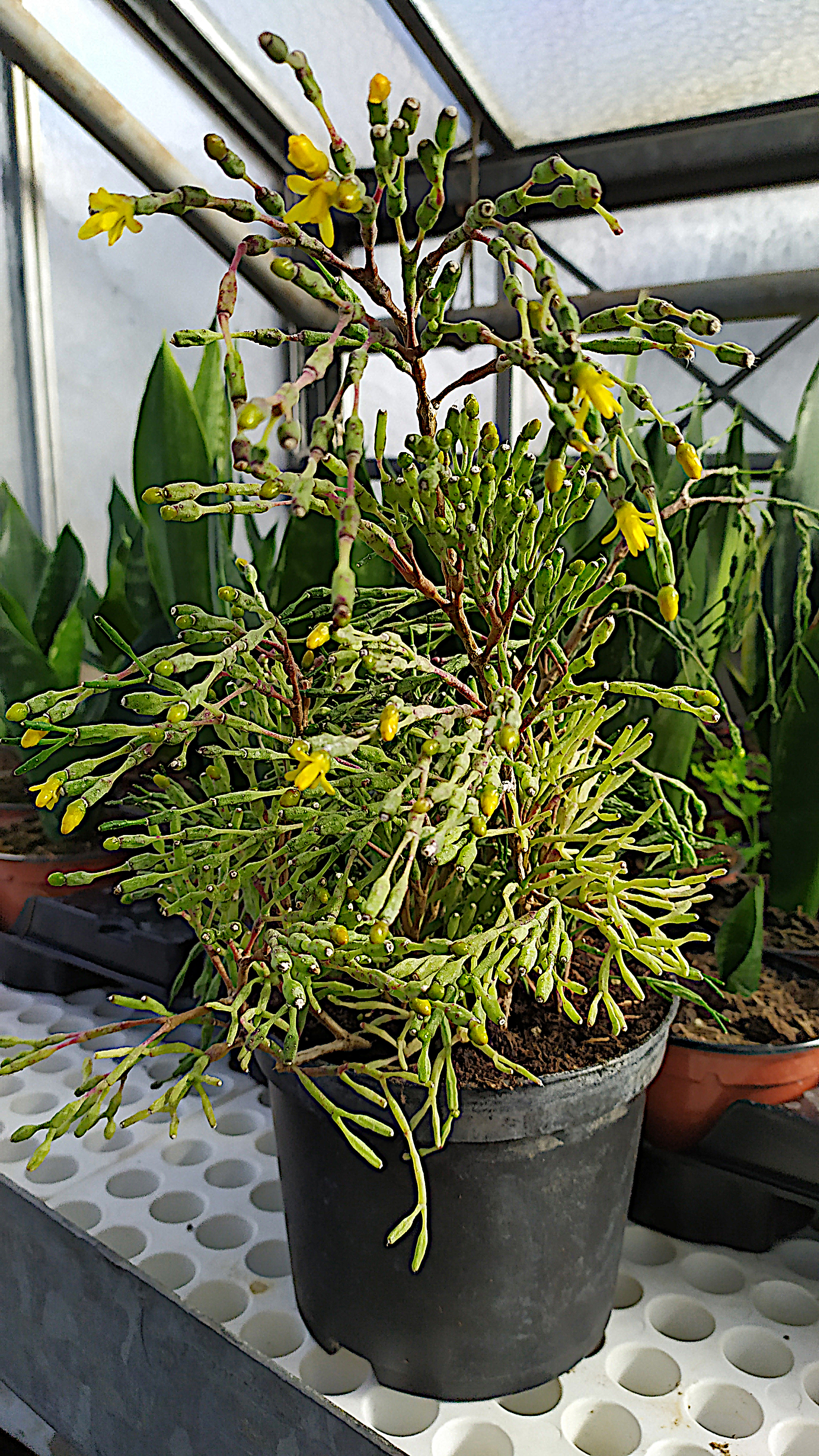

Hatiora salicornoides, also spelt Hatiora salicornioides, the bottle cactus, dancing-bones, drunkard's-dream, or spice cactus, is a species of flowering plant in the cactus family. A member of the tribe Rhipsalideae, it often grows as an epiphyte, natively in eastern Brazil and ornamentally elsewhere.

== Description ==
Hatiora salicornoides grows to about 1 m (3 ft) tall with an erect to pendent growth habit. Its stems are composed of segments 1.5–5 cm (0.6–2.0 in) long. Each segment is shaped like a club or bottle, with the narrower end at the base. The stems branch from the end of a segment, with up to six branches forming a whorl. The yellow to orange flowers are borne at the ends of younger stem segments, and are 1–2 cm (0.4–0.8 in) long and about the same across when open. Translucent white berries follow the flowers.

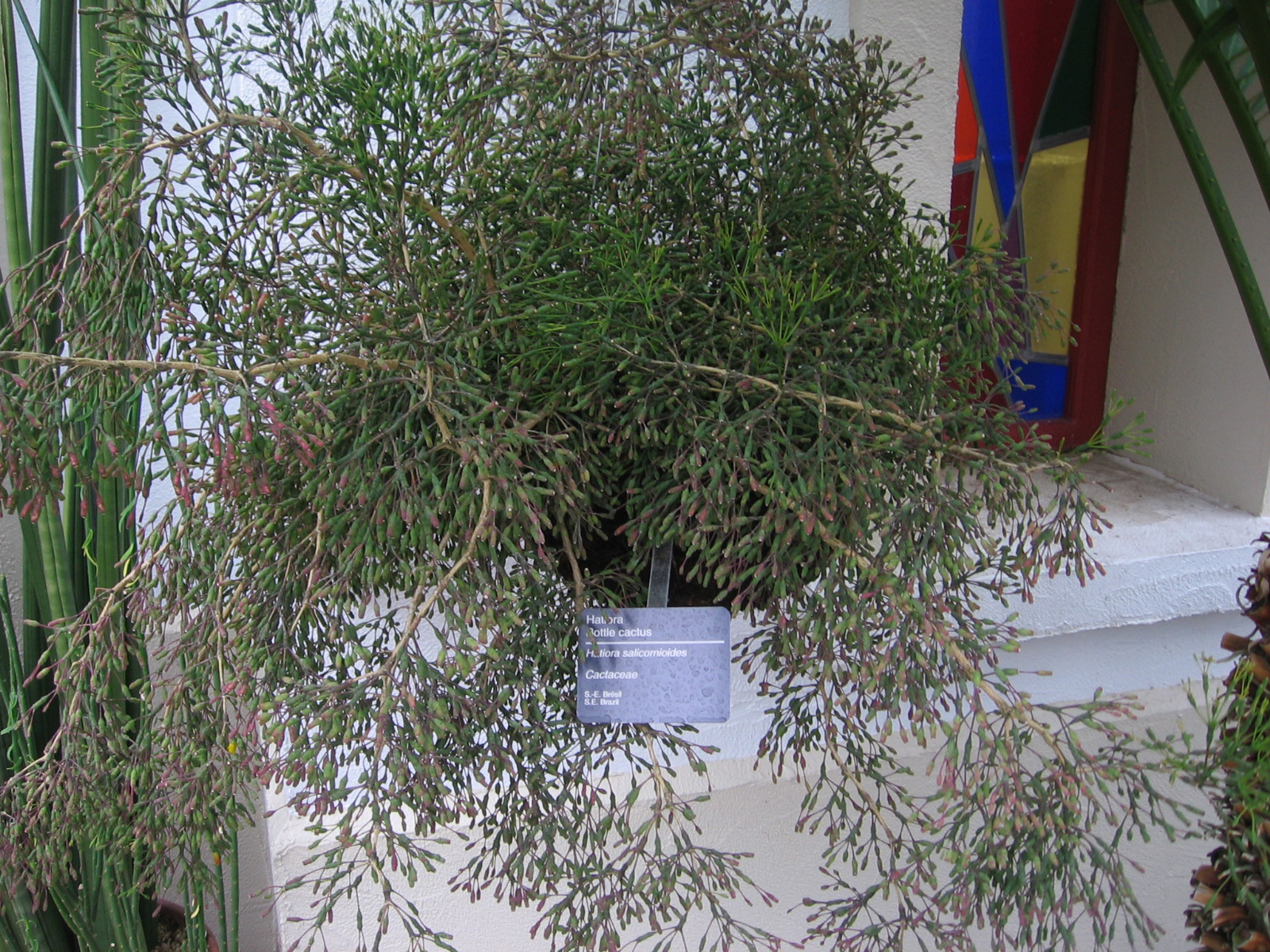
Growth habit in cultivation

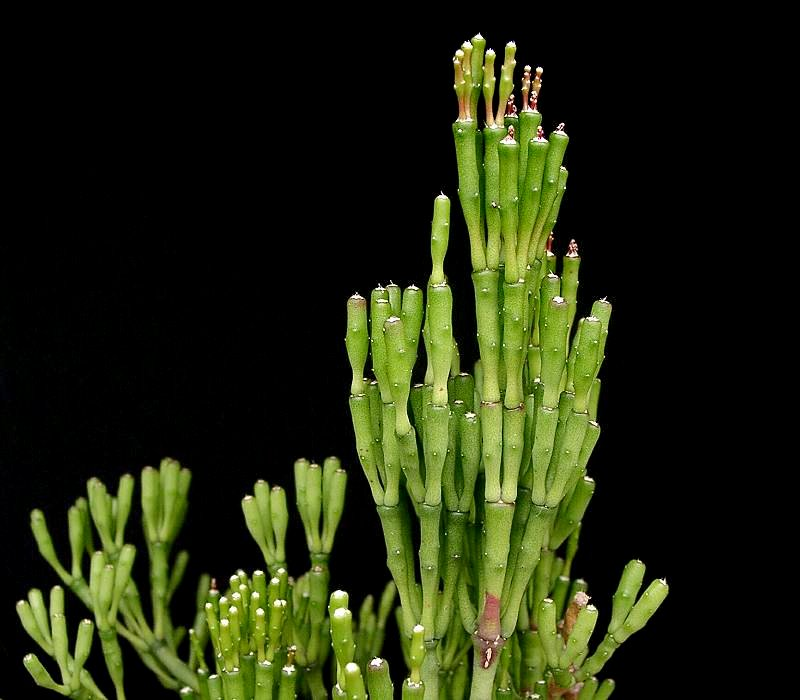
Branching

== Taxonomy ==
The species was first described by Adrian H. Haworth in 1819, as Rhipsalis salicornoides. Haworth spelled the specific epithet as salicornoides; subsequent authors corrected the spelling to salicornioides, regarding the original as an orthographic error. The International Plant Names Index later deemed the specific epithet incorrectable to salicornioides as is it derived from a noun and a suffix rather than two Greek or Latin words. The epithet means "similar to Salicornia". The species was placed under the genus Hatiora in 1915, after previously belonging to the “lost” (and ultimately, abandoned) genus of Hariota. Molecular phylogenetic studies have confirmed its placement in the correct genus, and also in the tribe Rhipsalideae, showing a close relation to H. cylindrica (which has been considered synonymous with H. salicornoides, as a cultivar/form or variety). H. salicornoides is highly variable, as many succulent plants can be, and may possibly include other distinct species.

== Distribution and habitat ==
Hatiora salicornoides is found along the coast (and slightly inland) of the Southeast Region of Brazil, in states that are parallel to the Atlantic Ocean—although the plant is not typically found growing directly at sea level. Primarily, the species is known from the states of Bahia, Espírito Santo, Minas Gerais, Rio de Janeiro, São Paulo and Paraná; cities and municipalities where it is known from include Belo Horizonte, Curitiba, São José dos Pinhais, and Tiradentes, among others; it may also be found in and around metro Rio de Janeiro and São Paulo, where it grows naturally among tall trees, parks and landscaping. Additionally, a number of large botanic gardens and national parks are situated close to—or directly inside of—the city limits of Río de Janeiro and São Paulo, such as Tijuca National Park and the Rio de Janeiro Botanical Garden, which help to provide a protected, natural habitat for these delicate epiphytic cacti in the middle of two of the planet's most densely populated megacities.

The vast and fragile forested stretch of Southeastern Brazilian coastline, the Atlantic Forest ecoregion (or Mata Atlantico), contains dense, and relatively still-intact, forest habitat burgeoning with endemic flora and fauna, including a number of Hatiora species, among other jungle cacti. The region's rapid rate of plant growth, and high number of unique species, is attributed to a stable ambient humidity level and relatively consistent equatorial temperatures; in addition to the regular precipitation and thunderstorms the region receives, further humidity is gleaned by plants via fog, marine layer, and morning dew. The region is also flowing with numerous rivers and streams, along which dozens of epiphytic species may be seen growing on tree branches directly above the water, seemingly "intentionally", as to directly benefit from the ambient humidity and cooling breezes generated by the fast-flowing river.

Within the Atlantic forests, and indeed much of Brazil's forested regions, the limbs of trees are often the most common places to find epiphytic cacti. Hatiora may be found growing in very high branches or closer to the forest floor, or in peculiar and unexpected locations on any given tree. Hatiora grow and become established wherever they have sprouted (from dispersed seed) or taken root, vegetatively, via a broken segment or cutting separating and landing on a new tree branch. Vegetative (asexual) reproduction is typically the fastest means by which epiphytic cacti species can spread and establish new habitats. The plants utilize trees, boulders, logs or other natural objects as permanent, fixed structures. Trees in Brazilian forests often become "communities" or symbiotic "networks" featuring a myriad of arboreal cacti growing with other epiphytic plant families and genera, such as Araceae, Bromeliaceae, ferns, mosses, Orchidaceae, Peperomia, Tradescantia, and more. Every available space is used to its maximum potential in these productive rainforests, with the plant-laden trees giving an almost "dripping" appearance. With most of the aforementioned plant types, as well as Hatiora, root nodes or internodes—part of the plant where each leaf connects with the next—will send out sticky-tipped aerial roots to anchor the plant in place, adhering to the textured tree bark. Once stability is achieved, the plants gradually grow and transform, moving slowly closer to the sunlight.

In addition to thriving in moist forest, these diminutive cacti are also found growing on trees in the more open savanna habitats, rocky outcrops, humid canyons, as well as montane regions, at elevations of 200–1,750 m (660–5,740 ft). It is seldom, if ever, found rooted into the ground, and nearly always found growing arboreally or as a lithophyte.

== Cultivation ==
Hatiora salicornoides is grown as an ornamental plant. It requires some humidity, and is not frost-tolerant. Light shade and a minimum average temperature of 12 °C (54 °F) are recommended. Given these conditions, it has been successfully cultivated outside in Phoenix, Arizona. In climates with lower winter temperatures, it is cultivated in greenhouses or as a house plant. It is propagated by stem cuttings.

In the UK Hatiora salicornoides has gained the Royal Horticultural Society's Award of Garden Merit.

== See also ==
- Schlumbergera
- Succulent
