= John Miller (botanical illustrator) =

German engraver and botanist (1715–c.1790)

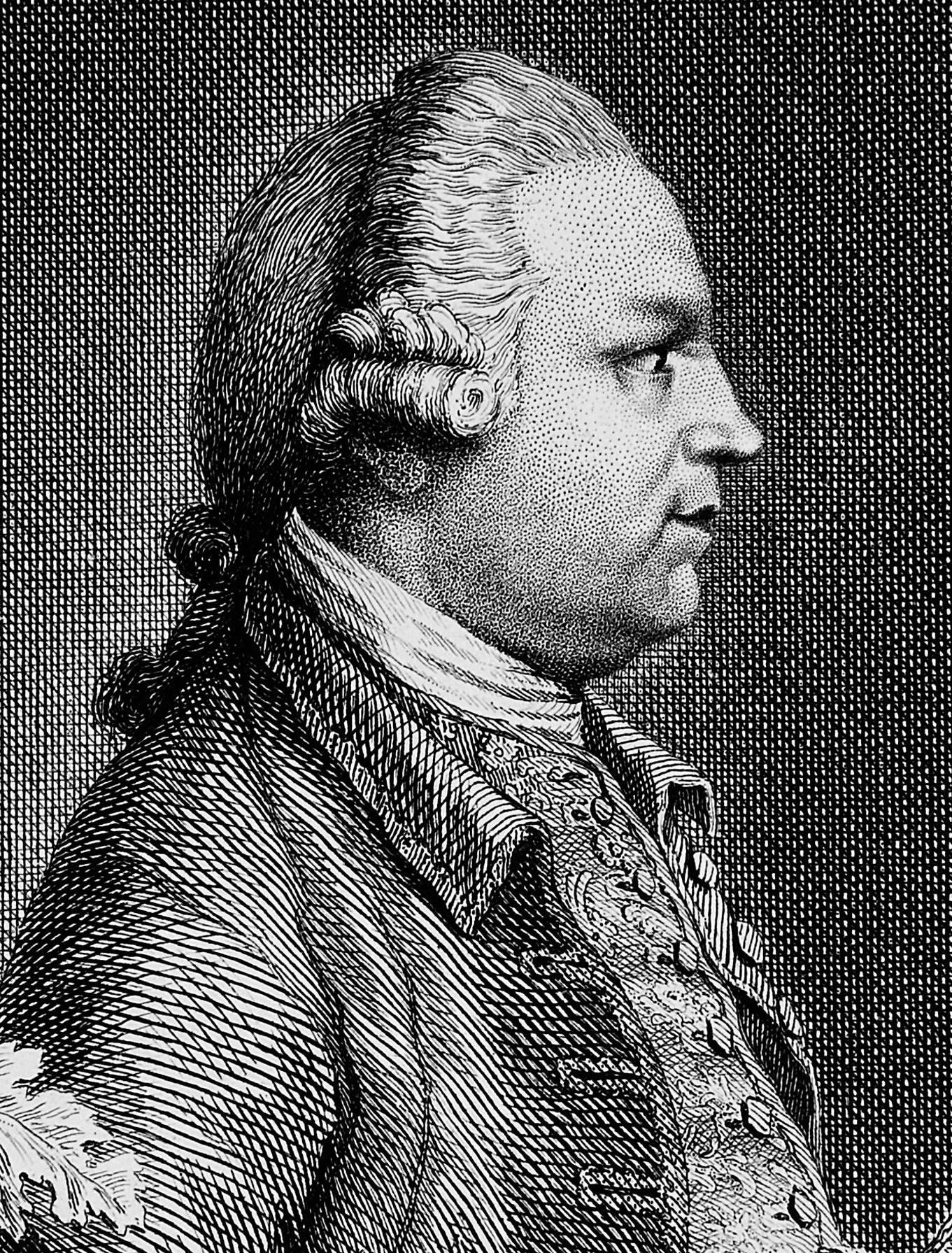
Self-portrait of Miller, reproduced by C. F. Maillet

John Miller (1715–c.1792), also known as Johann Sebastian Müller, was a German engraver and botanist active in London. Born in Nuremberg, he trained under Johann Christoph Weigel and came to England in 1744 with his brother Tobias–an engraver of architecture–and lived there the rest of his life. He worked with Philip Miller of Chelsea Physic Garden. He signed his early works J. S. Müller or J. S. Miller, but after 1760 used the signature of John Miller. His works included a 20-part series Illustratio Systematis Sexualis Linnaei (Illustration of the Sexual System of Linnaeus), which helped popularize the work of Carl Linnaeus to English readers. He also produced collaborative works such as Botanical Tables (1785), with John Stuart, 3rd Earl of Bute. Furthermore, he painted landscapes, which, as well as some of his engravings, he exhibited with the Society of Arts and at the Royal Academy from 1762 to 1788. He was twice married, and had in all twenty-seven children: two of his sons, John Frederick Miller and James Müller or Miller, also became known as illustrators. The standard author abbreviation J.S.Muell. is used to indicate this person as the author when citing a botanical name.

== Works ==
- Engravings of Insects, with descriptions. London 7 p., 10 col.plates. (1759-1760)
- The Figures of the most beautiful, useful, and uncommon plants (1760)
- Illustratio Systematis Sexualis Linnaei (1770-1777)
- Botanical Tables (1785)
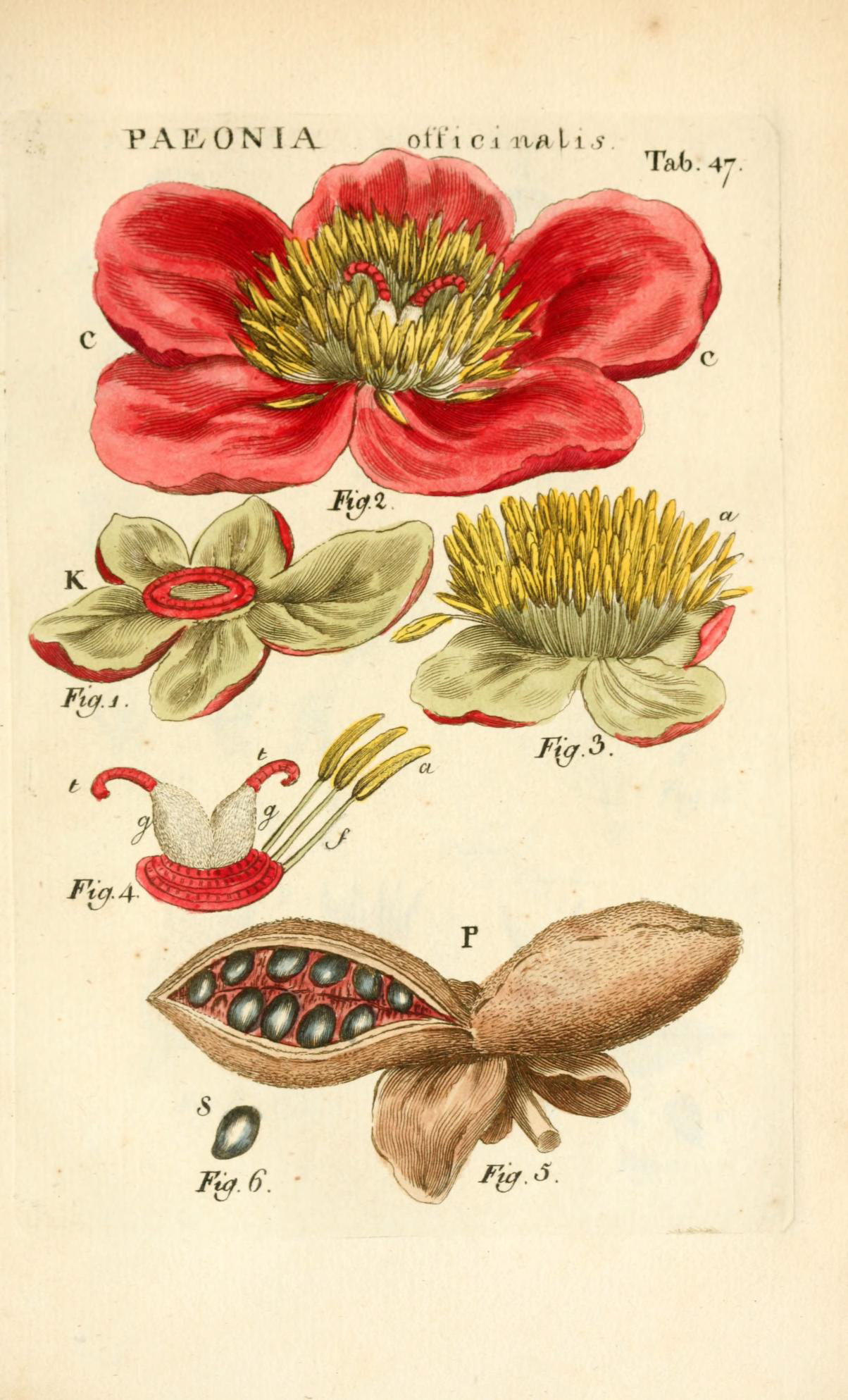
Paeonia officinalis from Illustratio systematis sexualis Linnaeani

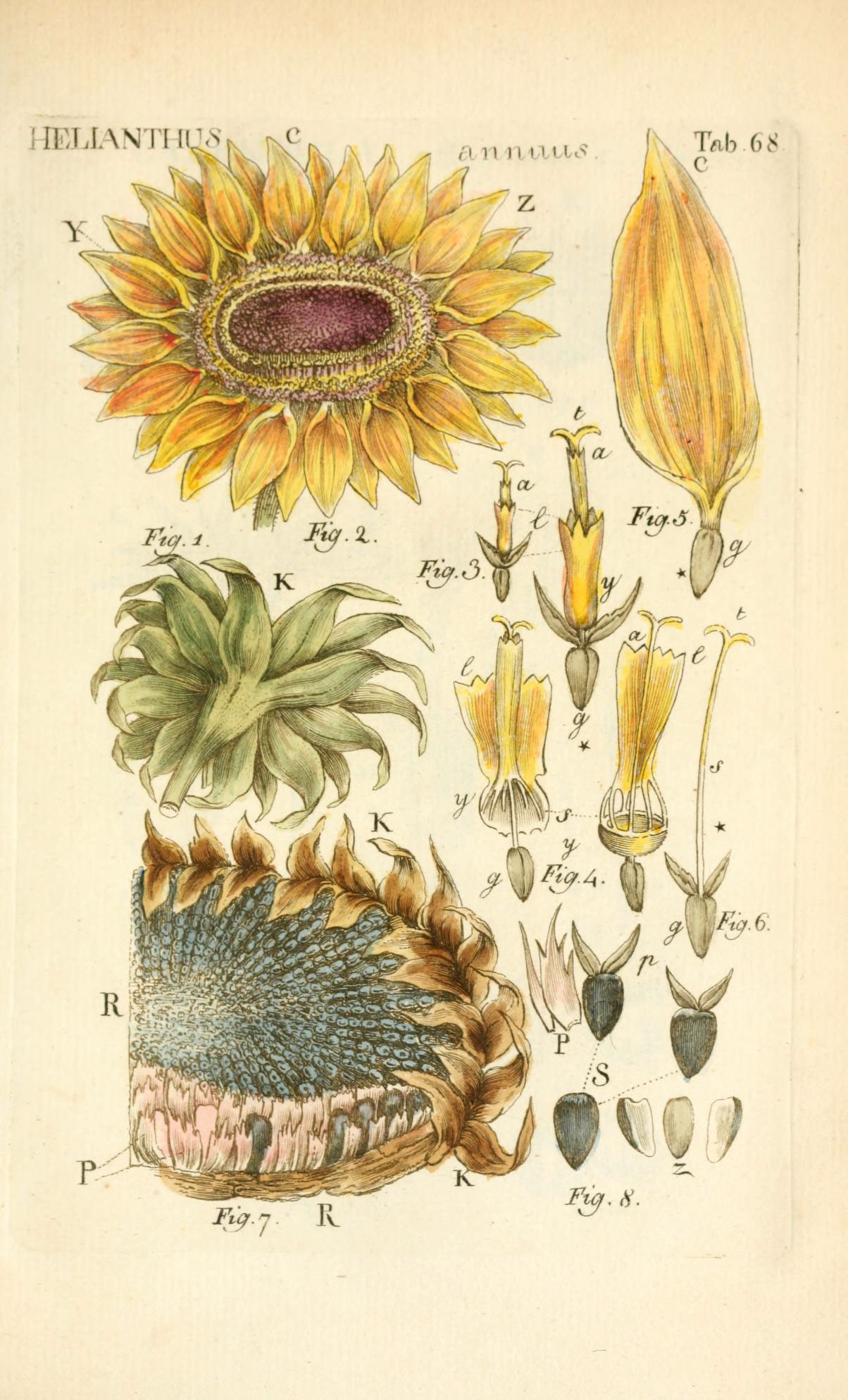
Helianthus annuus from Illustratio systematis sexualis Linnaeani

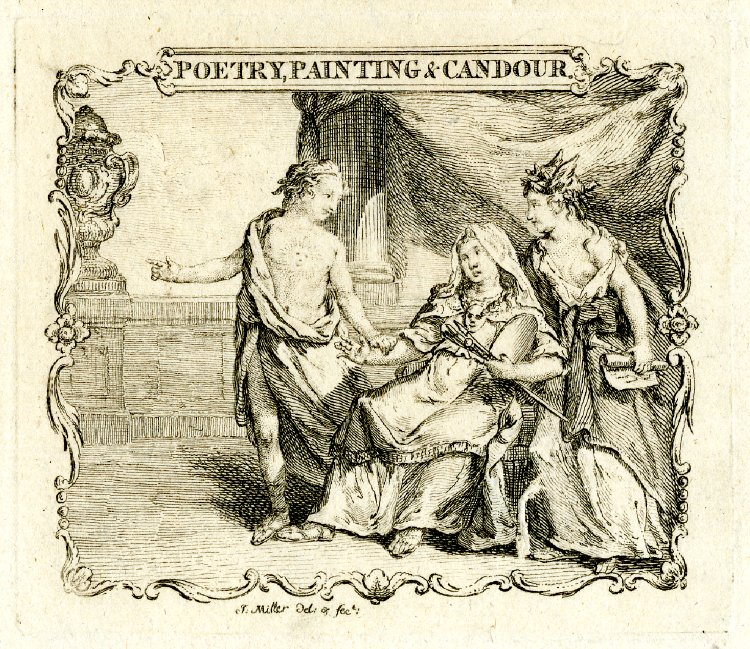
"Poetry, Painting & Candour"
