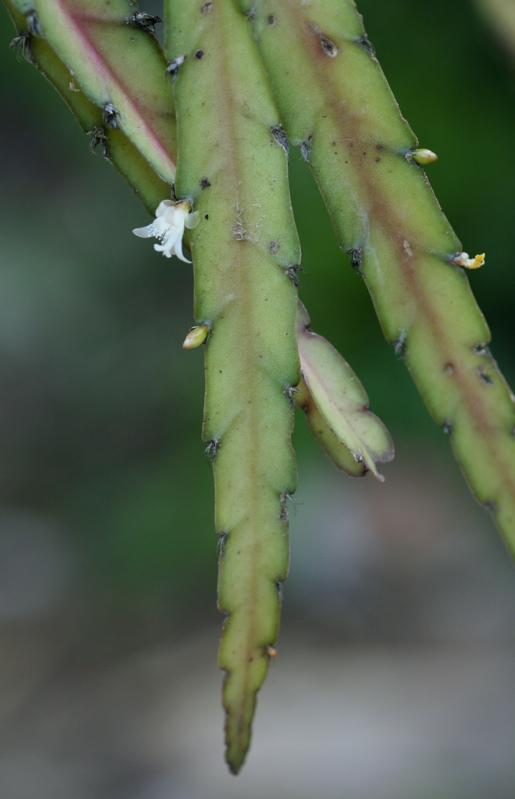
- Lepismium cruciforme var. anceps

Scientific classification
- Kingdom: Plantae
- Clade: Tracheophytes
- Clade: Angiosperms
- Clade: Eudicots
- Order: Caryophyllales
- Family: Cactaceae
- Subfamily: Cactoideae
- Tribe: Rhipsalideae
- Genus: Lepismium; Pfeiff.

Synonyms
- Acanthorhipsalis (K.Schum.) Britton & Rose; Nothorhipsalis Doweld; Ophiorhipsalis (K.Schum.) Doweld

= Lepismium =

Genus of cacti

Lepismium is a genus of mostly epiphytic cacti, with seven species. They are found in tropical South America.

== Species ==
Species accepted by the Plants of the World Online as of October 2026:

- Lepismium cruciforme (Vell.) Miq.
- Lepismium floribundum Süpplie
- Lepismium houlletianum (Lem.) Barthlott
- Lepismium lineare (K.Schum.) Barthlott
- Lepismium lorentzianum (Griseb.) Barthlott
- Lepismium lumbricoides (Lem.) Barthlott
- Lepismium warmingianum (K.Schum.) Barthlott
