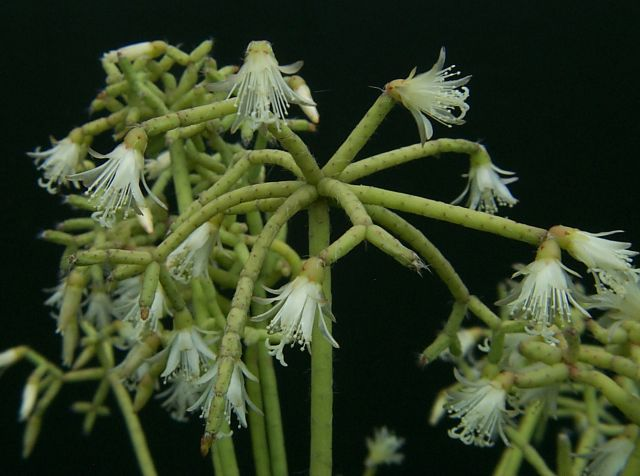
- Rhipsalis cereuscula

Scientific classification
- Kingdom: Plantae
- Clade: Tracheophytes
- Clade: Angiosperms
- Clade: Eudicots
- Order: Caryophyllales
- Family: Cactaceae
- Subfamily: Cactoideae
- Tribe: Rhipsalideae; DC.

Genera
- See text.

= Rhipsalideae =

Tribe of cacti

The Rhipsalideae are a small tribe of cacti, comprising four or five genera (and around 60 species). They grow on trees (epiphytes) or on rocks (lithophytes), where they either hang down or form creeping or upright shrubs. Their flowers open in the day and remain open at night; they may be either radially symmetrical (regular) or bilaterally symmetrical (zygomorphic). The fruits are berry-like, fleshy with smallish seeds.

They are found mainly in the east of South America, with a centre of diversity in Bolivia, but some species occur in Central America and North America; one species, Rhipsalis baccifera, also occurs in the Old World.

== Taxonomy ==
The tribe Rhipsalideae was established by Augustin Pyramus de Candolle in 1828. De Candolle included only one genus, Rhipsalis. Cacti belonging to the Rhipsalideae are quite distinct in appearance and habit from other cacti, growing on trees or rocks as epiphytes or lithophytes, and are thus easily distinguished. However, for many years there has been confusion as to how to divide the tribe into genera. For example, in 1858 Charles Lemaire recognized the distinctiveness of the species then called Epiphyllum russellianum by creating the genus Schlumbergera. However he kept the only other species of Schlumbergera known at the time in a different genus. As another example, in 1923, Nathaniel Britton and Joseph Rose created the genus Hatiora. Of the species known at the time, they placed two in Hatiora (H. salicornoides and H. cylindrica). They placed one species in a new genus, Rhipsalidopsis, as R. rosea, but left a related species in Schlumbergera as S. gaertneri, where they had placed it in 1913. According to Anderson, the confusion among the Rhipsalideae was not clarified until work by Wilhelm Barthlott and Nigel Taylor in 1995.

Molecular phylogenetic studies led to a slight modification of the approach taken by Barthlott and Taylor, since with their circumscriptions, Hatiora and Schlumbergera were not monophyletic. One hypothesis for the relationships between the genera is shown below. The yellow shading shows species formerly placed in Hatiora, but which were placed by Calvente et al. in 2011 in a more broadly defined Schlumbergera, and are placed in the genus Rhipsalidopsis by other sources.

- Rhipsalideae
  - - Schlumbergera s.l.
      - Rhipsalidopsis
        - Rhipsalidopsis rosea
        - Rhipsalidopsis gaertneri
      - Schlumbergera s.s.
        - Schlumbergera opuntioides
        - - Schlumbergera lutea
          - 3 other Schlumbergera spp. included in the 2011 study
    - Hatiora s.s. (3 spp.)
    - Lepismium
  - Rhipsalis

=== Genera ===
The genera included in the tribe as of January 2023 are as follows, with species counts based on Plants of the World Online:

- Hatiora Britton & Rose – 3 species; synonyms include Epiphyllopsis, Hariota DC non Andan., Pseudozygocactus; it has been included in Rhipsalis
- Lepismium Pfeiff. – 7 species; synonyms include Acanthorhipsalis, Lymanbensonia, Pfeiffera; it has been included in Rhipsalis
- Rhipsalidopsis Britton & Rose – 2 species (plus an artificial hybrid); included in Schlumbergera by Calvente et al. (2011)
- Rhipsalis Gaertn. – 45 species; synonyms include Erythrorhipsalis; most species in the tribe have been placed here at one time or another
- Schlumbergera Lem. – 7 species; synonyms include Epiphyllanthus, Epiphyllum Pfeiffer non. Haworth and Zygocactus
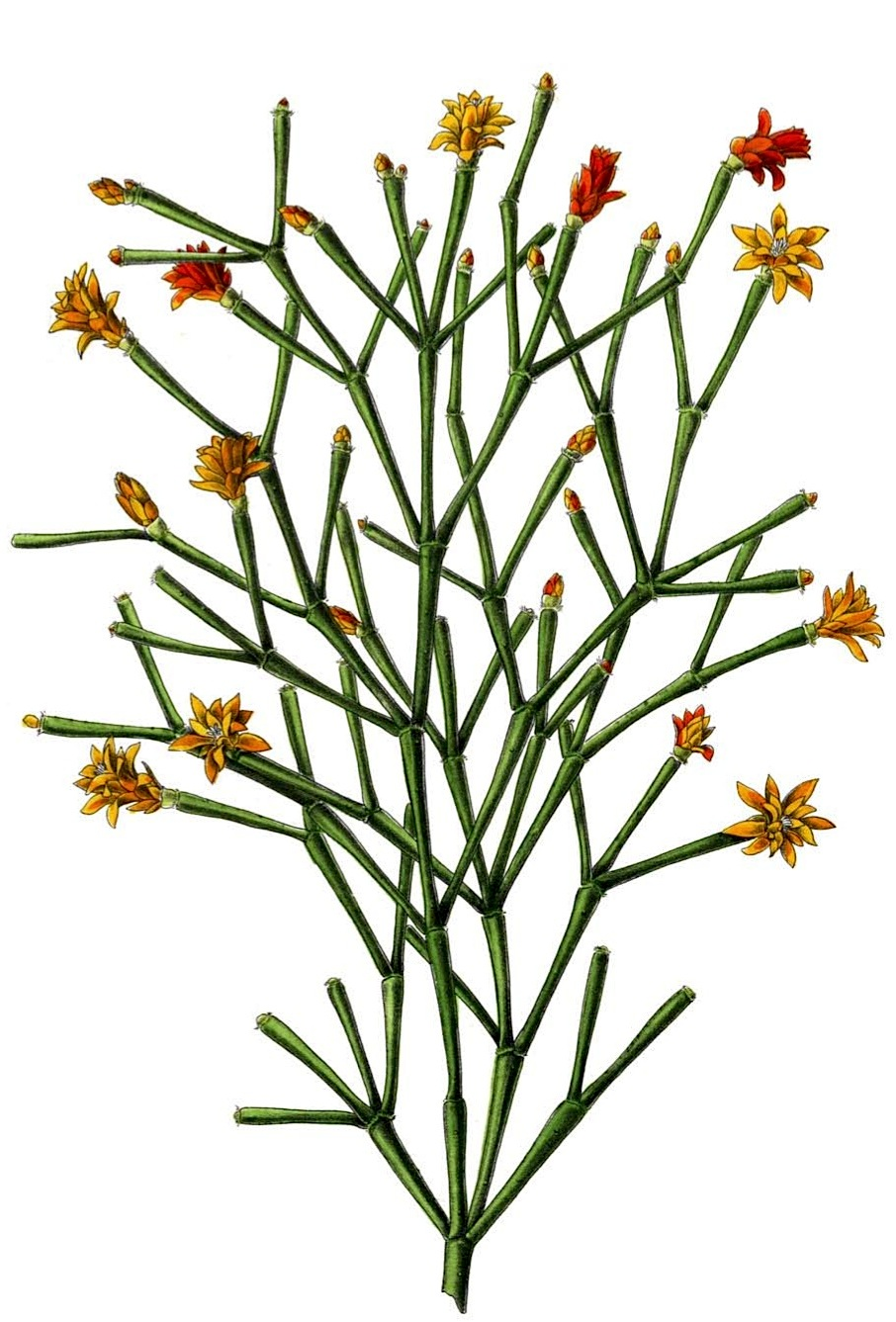
Illustration of Hatiora salicornoides

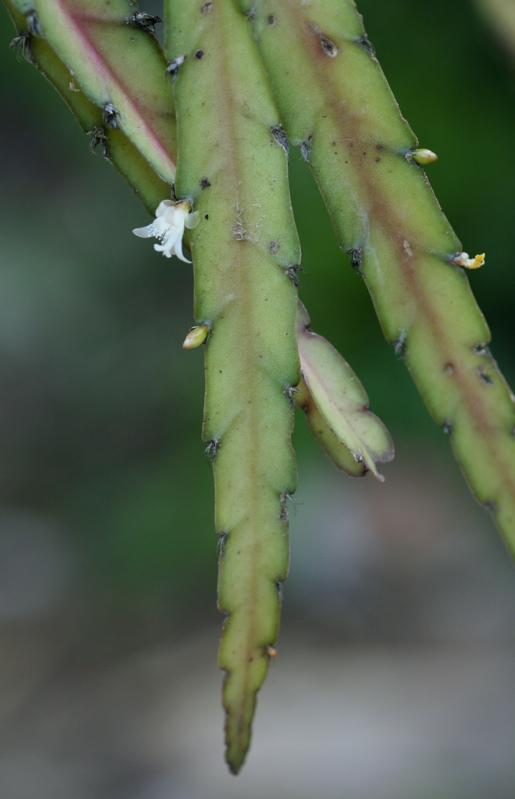
Lepismium cruciforme

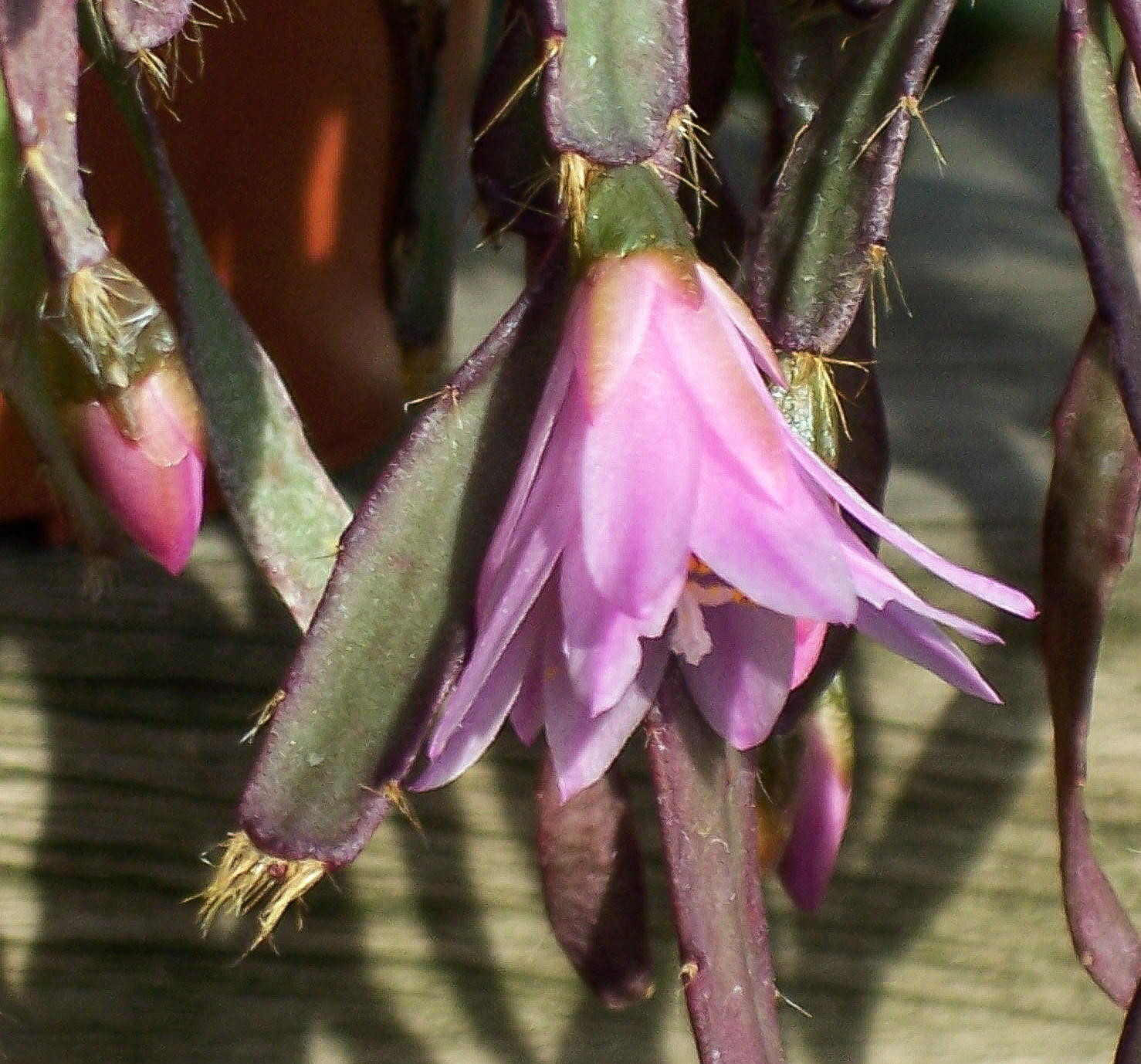
Rhipsalidopsis rosea

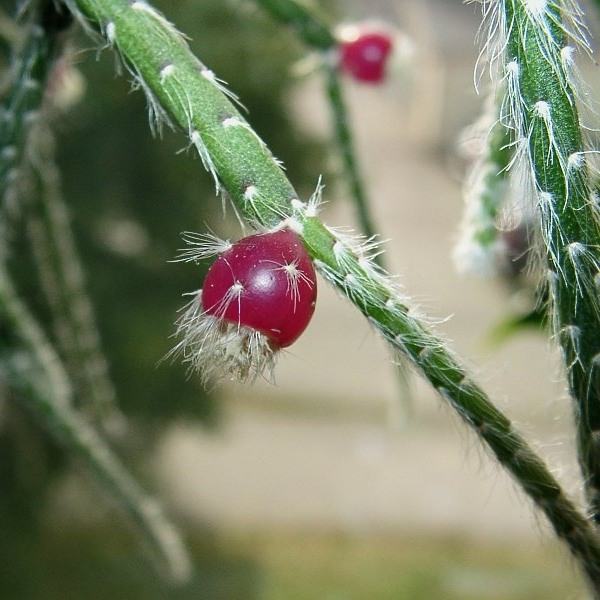
Rhipsalis pilocarpa fruit

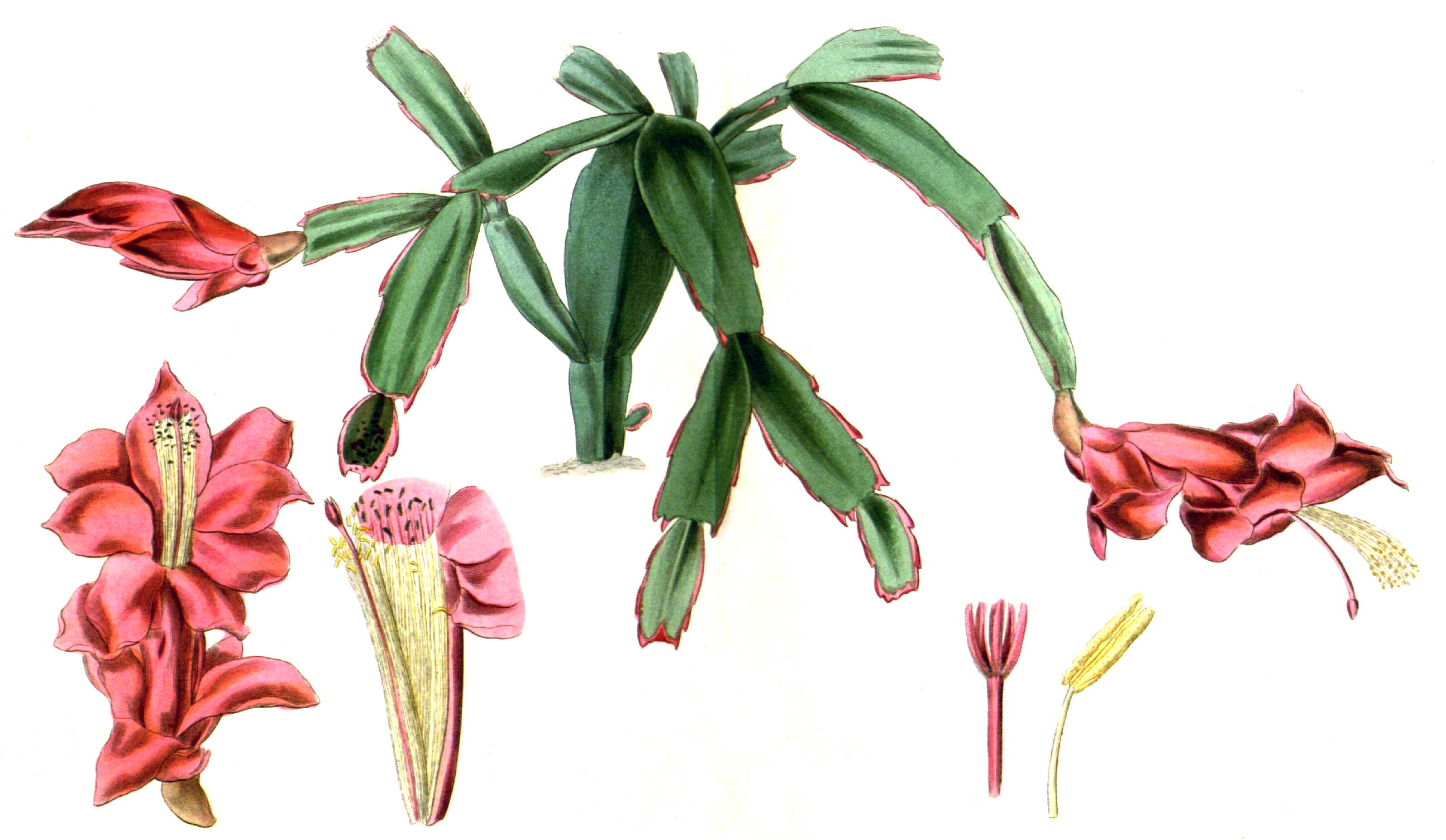
Illustration of Schlumbergera truncata

== Bibliography ==
- Anderson, Edward F. (2001), The Cactus Family, Pentland, Oregon: Timber Press, ISBN 978-0-88192-498-5
