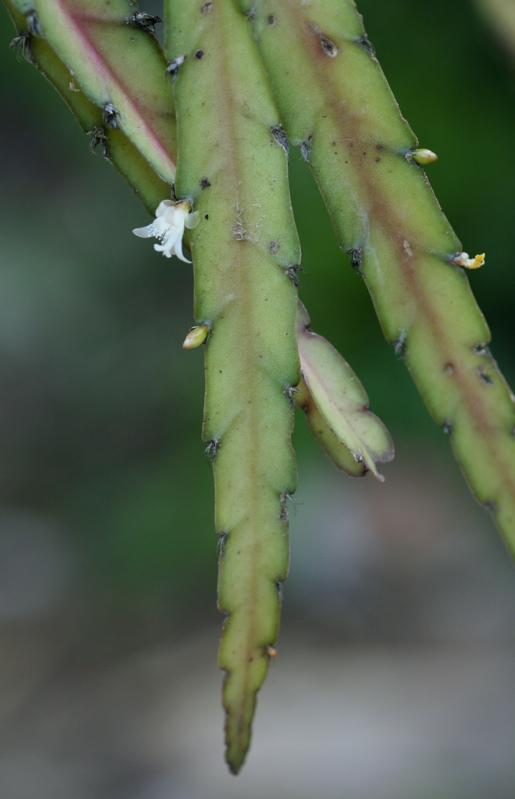
- Lepismium cruciforme var. anceps

Conservation status
- Least Concern (IUCN 3.1)

Scientific classification
- Kingdom: Plantae
- Clade: Tracheophytes
- Clade: Angiosperms
- Clade: Eudicots
- Order: Caryophyllales
- Family: Cactaceae
- Subfamily: Cactoideae
- Genus: Lepismium
- Species: L. cruciforme

Binomial name
- Lepismium cruciforme (Vellozo) Miquel

= Lepismium cruciforme =

Species of cactus

Lepismium cruciforme is a species of plant in the family Cactaceae. It is found in Argentina, Brazil, and Paraguay. Its natural habitat is subtropical or tropical moist lowland forests. It is threatened by habitat loss.

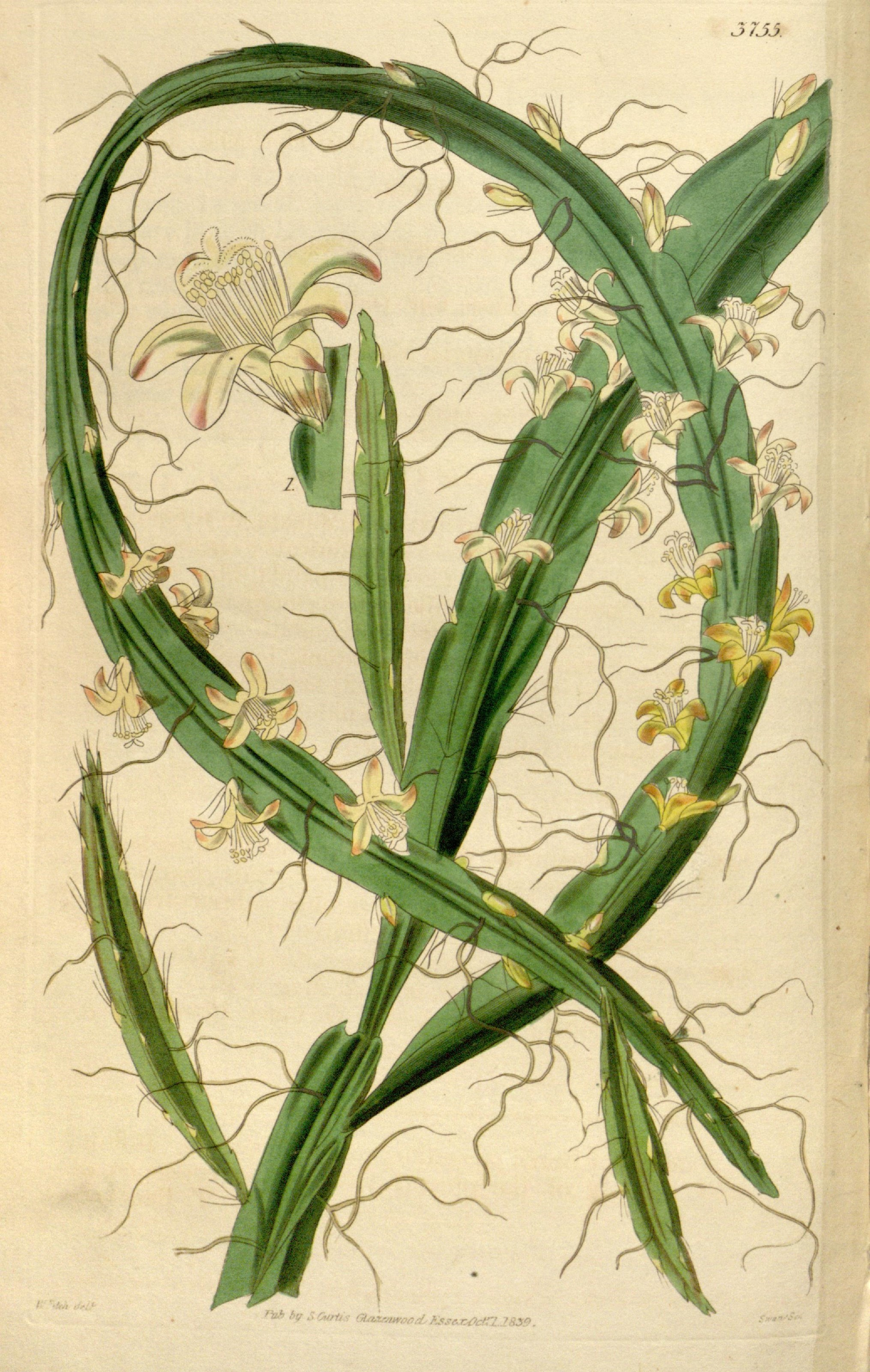
Illustration showing plant details.
