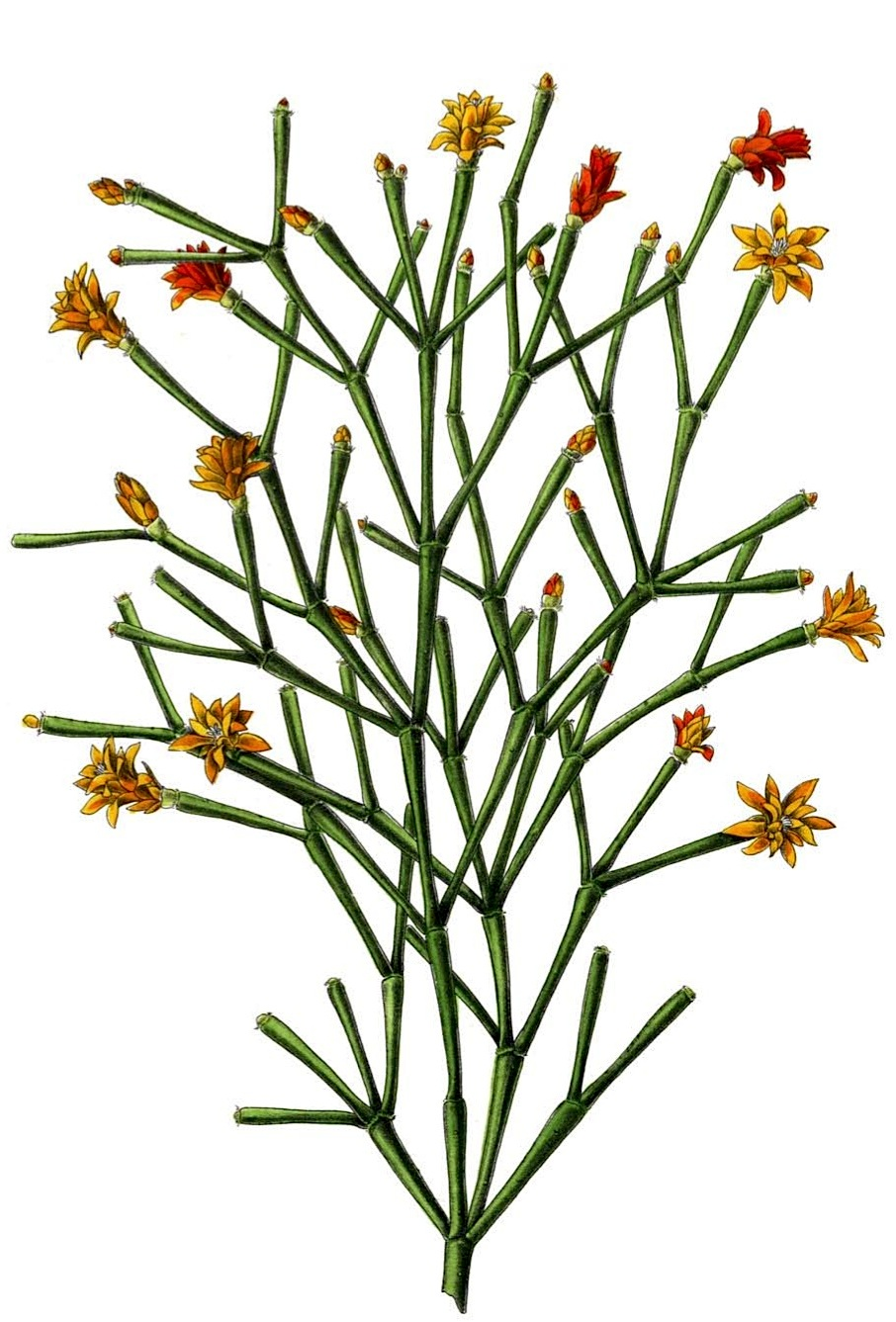
- Hatiora salicornoides

Scientific classification
- Kingdom: Plantae
- Clade: Embryophytes
- Clade: Tracheophytes
- Clade: Angiosperms
- Clade: Eudicots
- Order: Caryophyllales
- Family: Cactaceae
- Subfamily: Cactoideae
- Tribe: Rhipsalideae
- Genus: Hatiora; Britton & Rose

Type species
- Hatiora salicornoides (Haw.) Britton & Rose

Species
- See text

Synonyms
- Hariota DC.; Rhipsalidopsis Britton & Rose; Epiphyllopsis (A.Berger) Backeb. & F.M.Knuth

= Hatiora =

Genus of flowering plants in the cactus family

Hatiora is a small genus of epiphytic cacti which belongs to the tribe Rhipsalideae within the subfamily Cactoideae of the Cactaceae. Recent taxonomic studies have led to the three species formerly placed in subgenus Rhipsalidopsis being removed from the genus, including the well known and widely cultivated ornamental plants known as Easter cactus or Whitsun cactus (cultivars or hybrids of the former Hatiora gaertneri).

== Description ==
All Hatiora species are found as epiphytes growing on trees or (rarely) lithophytes growing on rocks. They are found in the tropical rainforests of the Mata Atlântica in eastern Brazil. The plants are weakly succulent, growing more or less upright and becoming woody at the base when older. Spines are usually missing. The insect-pollinated flowers are borne terminally. They are small, with a diameter of about 2 cm (0.8 in), actinomorphic (radially symmetrical), bell-shaped and always coloured (yellow, yellow-orange or pink). The fruit is a berry. By contrast with species of the genus Schlumbergera, most of which have flattened stems, Hatiora species have stems with a circular cross-section.

== Taxonomy ==
Cacti belonging to the tribe Rhipsalideae are quite distinct in appearance and habit from other cacti, as they grow on trees or rocks as epiphytes or lithophytes. However, for a long time there has been confusion as to how the rhipsalid species should be divided into genera. In 1819, Haworth described the first discovered species of the modern genus Hatiora under the name Rhipsalis salicornoides. In 1834, A.P. de Candolle recognized the distinctness of this species and transferred it to a new genus Hariota, named after Thomas Hariot, a 16th-century botanist. Later a second species, H. gaertneri, was initially named as Epiphyllum russellianum var. gaertneri (Epiphyllum russellianum is now Schlumbergera russelliana) and then in 1889 as Epiphyllum gaertneri. A third species, H. rosea, was described in 1912 as Rhipsalis rosea.

By 1923, many nomenclatural uncertainties and confusion had arisen over the name Hariota. Nathaniel Britton and Joseph Rose created a new name Hatiora as a taxonomic anagram of Hariota. Of the species known at the time, they placed Hariota salicornioides in Hatiora along with H. cylindrica; they had already placed H. gaertneri in Schlumbergera in 1913 and left it there; and they erected a new genus, Rhipsalidopsis, for H rosea. Two further species which have been assigned to Hatiora were placed in various genera, including the original Hariota and Rhipsalis. According to Anderson, the confusion among the Rhipsalideae was not clarified until work by Wilhelm Barthlott and Nigel Taylor in 1995, which placed six species in Hatiora, divided between two subgenera.

Phylogenetic studies using DNA have led to a modification of the Barthlott and Taylor classification and the three species of Hatiora they placed in subgenus Rhipsalidopsis have been transferred out of the genus. There is agreement that Hatiora epiphylloides should be placed in Schlumbergera (as Schlumbergera lutea). There is disagreement over the other two species. Some sources also include them in a broadly defined Schlumbergera, others place them as the only two species in the genus Rhipsalidopsis. Hatiora and the most broadly circumscribed Schlumbergera both branch from the tip and have short segments (less than 7 cm long). Hatiora has stems that are round in cross-section and radially symmetrical (actinomorphic) flowers, whereas Schlumbergera has flattened or otherwise angular stems and its flowers may be radially symmetrical or radially unsymmetrical (zygomorphic).

In the taxonomic treatments of the genus by Barthlott & Taylor (1995) and Hunt (2006), Hatiora was divided into two subgenera with six accepted species, plus a hybrid created in cultivation. Subgenus Rhipsalidopsis has subsequently been removed from Hatiora.

- Subgenus Hatiora, now comprising all of Hatiora:
  - Hatiora cylindrica Britton & Rose
  - Hatiora herminiae (Porto & A.Cast.) Backeb. ex Barthlott
  - Hatiora salicornoides (Haworth) Britton & Rose ex L.H.Bailey (the epithet is also spelt salicornioides)
- Subgenus Rhipsalidopsis, split between Schlumbergera and Rhipsalidopsis (or transferred to Schlumbergera)
  - Hatiora epiphylloides (Porto & Werderm.) Buxb. = Schlumbergera lutea
  - Hatiora gaertneri (Regel) Barthlott = Rhipsalidopsis gaertneri (syn. Schlumbergera gaertneri)
  - Hatiora rosea (Lagerh.) Barthlott = Rhipsalidopsis rosea (syn. Schlumbergera rosea )
  - Hatiora × graeseri (Werderm.) Barthlott ex D.R.Hunt = Rhipsalidopsis × graeseri (Barthlott ex D.R.Hunt) P.V.Heath (syn. Schlumbergera × graeseri), an artificial hybrid of Rhipsalidopsis gaertneri and Rhipsalidopsis rosea

=== Species ===
Image	Scientific name	Distribution
	Hatiora cylindrica Britton & Rose	Brazil (Bahia, Minas Gerais and Rio de Janeiro)
	Hatiora herminiae (Porto & A.Cast.) Backeb. ex Barthlott	Brazil (Minas Gerais and São Paulo)
	Hatiora salicornoides (Haworth) Britton & Rose ex L.H.Bailey	Brazil (Bahia, Espírito Santo, Minas Gerais, Rio de Janeiro state, São Paulo state and Paraná)

== Bibliography ==
- Anderson, Edward F. (2001), The Cactus Family, Pentland, Oregon: Timber Press, ISBN 978-0-88192-498-5
- Barthlott, W. (1987), "New names in Rhipsalidinae", Bradleya, 5 (5): 97–100, doi:10.25223/brad.n5.1987.a7, S2CID 91158296
- Barthlott, W. & Taylor, N.P. (1995), "Notes towards a monograph of Rhipsalidaeae (Cactaceae)", Bradleya, 13 (13): 43–79, doi:10.25223/brad.n13.1995.a7, S2CID 89883634
- Britton, N.L. & Rose, J.N. (1919–1923), The Cactaceae : descriptions and illustrations of plants of the cactus family, Washington: Carnegie Institute, OCLC 491535615
- Friedman, K.A. (1980), "Hatiora Britton & Rose", Cactus and Succulent Journal, 52: 127–129
- Hunt, David R., ed. (2006), The New Cactus Lexicon (2 volumes), Milborne Port: dh books, ISBN 978-0-9538134-4-5
- Taylor, N.P. & Zappi, D.C. (2004), Cacti of Eastern Brazil, London: Kew Publishing, ISBN 978-1-84246-056-6
