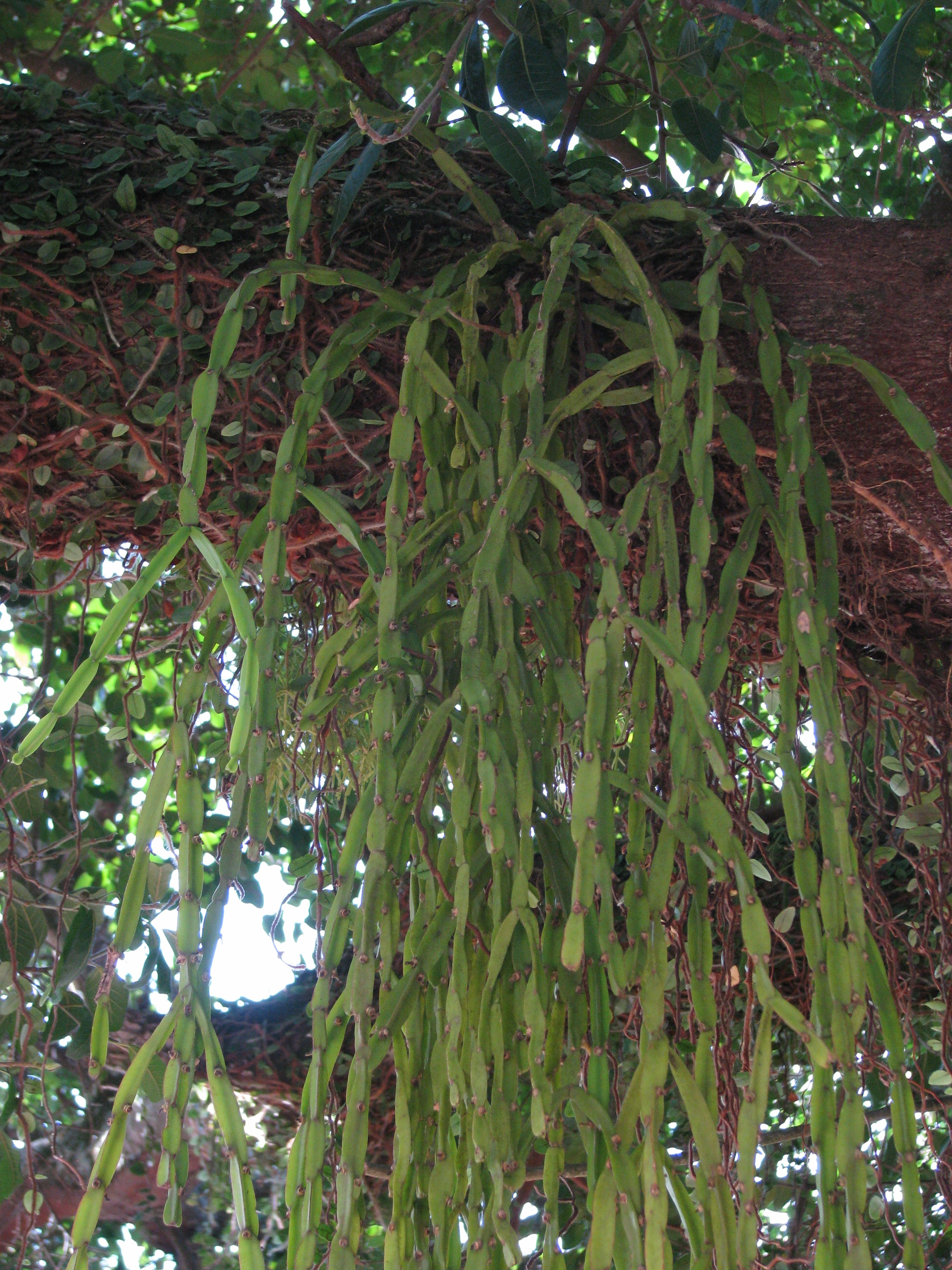

Conservation status
- Least Concern (IUCN 3.1)

Scientific classification
- Kingdom: Plantae
- Clade: Tracheophytes
- Clade: Angiosperms
- Clade: Eudicots
- Order: Caryophyllales
- Family: Cactaceae
- Subfamily: Cactoideae
- Genus: Rhipsalis
- Species: R. paradoxa

Binomial name
- Rhipsalis paradoxa (Salm-Dyck ex Pfeiffer) Salm-Dyck

= Rhipsalis paradoxa =

Species of cactus

Rhipsalis paradoxa is a species of plant in the family Cactaceae. It is endemic to Brazil. Its natural habitat is subtropical or tropical moist lowland forests. It is threatened by habitat loss.
