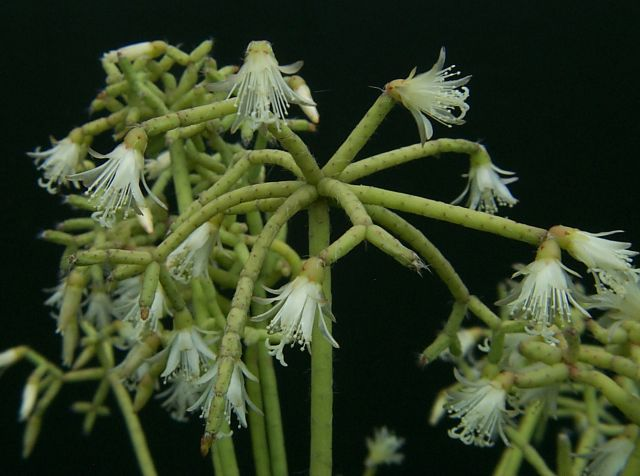
- Flowering Rhipsalis cereuscula

Scientific classification
- Kingdom: Plantae
- Clade: Tracheophytes
- Clade: Angiosperms
- Clade: Eudicots
- Order: Caryophyllales
- Family: Cactaceae
- Subfamily: Cactoideae
- Tribe: Rhipsalideae
- Genus: Rhipsalis; Gaertn.

Species
- Numerous, see text

Synonyms
- Erythrorhipsalis A.Berger

= Rhipsalis =

Genus of cacti

Rhipsalis (/ˈrɪpsəlɪs/ RIP-suh-lis) is a genus of epiphytic flowering plants in the cactus family, typically known as mistletoe cacti. They are found in parts of Central America, the Caribbean and northern regions of South America. One species, Rhipsalis baccifera also inhabits locations in Africa and Asia, and is the only cactus species naturally occurring in the Old World. This is the largest and most widely distributed genus of epiphytic cacti (those which live on other plants without damaging them).

The scientific name Rhipsalis derives from the Ancient Greek term for wickerwork, referring to the plants' many entangled or intertwined branches.

== Description ==
The morphology of Rhipsalis is very variable. The plants can grow mostly pendent, few grow more or less upright or sprawling. There are three main stem shapes: terete, angular and flattened. The stems are succulent, but the degree of succulence varies between the species. Some have very thick stems (e.g. Rhipsalis neves-armondii), whereas other have very thin, filiform stems (e.g. Rhipsalis baccifera, Rhipsalis clavata). In the majority of species, spines are missing or occur only in the juvenile stage (this is most prominent in Rhipsalis dissimilis). Rhipsalis pilocarpa has stems and fruits densely covered by bristles, making this species easily distinguishable from all other Rhipsalis. The flowers are borne lateral or apical and are actinomorphic with a varying number of perianth segments, stamens and carpels. They are small, usually about 1 cm in diameter, white or whitish in most species. Yellowish flowers occur in R. dissimilis and R. elliptica and R. hoelleri is the only Rhipsalis species with red flowers. The fruits are always berries, they are whitish or coloured pink, red or yellow. Vivipary has been observed in R. micrantha and R. baccifera.

== Taxonomy ==
The genus was described by Joseph Gaertner in 1788. But when he described the plant, he had in fact not realised it was a cactus. Instead, he assumed he had found a new species of Cassytha, (Note: The original spelling in publication is cassutha, but this is presumably a typographical error.) a parasitic laurel from a completely different plant family.

=== Species ===
In the taxonomic treatment in The New Cactus Lexicon, 35 species were accepted, divided into five subgenera (Phyllarthrorhipsalis, Rhipsalis, Epallagogonium, Calamorhipsalis, Erythrorhipsalis). A molecular study in 2011 showed the paraphyly of three subgenera as previously circumscribed (Rhipsalis, Calamorhipsalis and Epallagogonium). So a new subgeneric classification of Rhipsalis with only monophyletic subgenera Rhipsalis, Calamorhipsalis and Erythrorhipsalis was proposed. Species accepted by Plants of the World Online as of January 2023 are listed below, with subgeneric placements, where given, based on Calvente (2012).

Subgenus	Image	Scientific name	Distribution
Calamorhipsalis	R. dissimilis f. dissimilis	Rhipsalis dissimilis (G.Lindb.) K.Schum.	Brazil (Paraná, São Paulo)
Calamorhipsalis	R. floccosa ssp. tucumanensis	Rhipsalis floccosa Salm-Dyck ex Pfeiff.	Argentina, Bolivia, Brazil, Paraguay, Peru, Venezuela
Calamorhipsalis	R. hoelleri	Rhipsalis hoelleri Barthlott & N.P.Taylor	Brazil (Espírito Santo)
Calamorhipsalis	R. neves-armondii f. neves-armondii (yellow stamen) R. neves-armondii f. neves-armondii (orange stamen) R. neves-armondii f. megalantha	Rhipsalis neves-armondii K.Schum.	Brazil (Paraná, Rio de Janeiro, Santa Catarina, São Paulo)
Calamorhipsalis	R. pacheco-leonis ssp. pacheco-leonis R. pacheco-leonis ssp. catenulata	Rhipsalis pacheco-leonis Loefgr.	Brazil (Rio de Janeiro)
Calamorhipsalis	R. paradoxa ssp. septentrionalis R. paradoxa ssp. paradoxa	Rhipsalis paradoxa (Salm-Dyck ex Pfeiff.) Salm-Dyck	Brazil (Bahia, Espírito Santo, Minas Gerais, Paraná, Rio de Janeiro, Santa Catarina, São Paulo)
Calamorhipsalis	R. puniceodiscus	Rhipsalis puniceodiscus G.Lindb.	Brazil (Paraná, Rio de Janeiro, Santa Catarina, São Paulo)
Calamorhipsalis	Rhipsalis trigona	Rhipsalis trigona Pfeiff.	Brazil (Paraná, Santa Catarina, São Paulo)
Erythrorhipsalis	R. aurea	Rhipsalis aurea M.F.Freitas & J.M.A.Braga	Brazil (Rio de ]aneiro)
Erythrorhipsalis	R. burchellii R. burchellii	Rhipsalis burchellii Britton & Rose	Brazil
Erythrorhipsalis	R. campos-portoana	Rhipsalis campos-portoana Loefgr.	Brazil
Erythrorhipsalis	R. clavata f. delicatula R. clavata f. clavata	Rhipsalis clavata F.A.C.Weber	Brazil (Rio de Janeiro, São Paulo)
Erythrorhipsalis	R. cereuscula	Rhipsalis cereuscula Haw.	Argentina, Bolivia, Brazil, Paraguay, Uruguay
Erythrorhipsalis	R. juengeri	Rhipsalis juengeri Barthlott & N.P.Taylor	Brazil (São Paulo)
Erythrorhipsalis	R. ormindoi	Rhipsalis ormindoi N.P.Taylor & Zappi	Brazil (Rio de Janeiro)
Erythrorhipsalis	R. pilocarpa R. pilocarpa	Rhipsalis pilocarpa Loefgr.	Brazil (Espírito Santo, Minas Gerais, Paraná, Rio de Janeiro, São Paulo)
Erythrorhipsalis		Rhipsalis pulchra Loefgr.	Brazil (Minas Gerais, Paraná, Rio de Janeiro, São Paulo)
Rhipsalis		Rhipsalis agudoensis N.P.Taylor	Brazil (Rio Grande do Sul)
Rhipsalis		Rhipsalis baccifera (J.S.Muell.) Stearn	Widely distributed: tropical and subtropical America, tropical Africa, Madagascar, Sri Lanka
Rhipsalis	R. barthlottii	Rhipsalis barthlottii Ralf Bauer & N.Korotkova	Brazil (Rio de Janeiro; Serra dos Orgãos)
Rhipsalis		Rhipsalis cereoides (Backeb. & Voll) Backeb.	Brazil
Rhipsalis	R. crispata R. crispata	Rhipsalis crispata (Haw.) Pfeiff.	Brazil (Pernambuco, Rio de Janeiro, São Paulo)
Rhipsalis		Rhipsalis cuneata Britton & Rose	Bolivia
Rhipsalis		Rhipsalis elliptica G.Lindb. ex K.Schum.	Brazil (Minas Gerais, Paraná, Santa Catarina, São Paulo)
Rhipsalis	R. ewladiana	Rhipsalis ewaldiana Barthlott & N.P.Taylor	Brazil (Rio de Janeiro)
Rhipsalis	R. flagelliformis	Rhipsalis flagelliformis N.P.Taylor & Zappi	Brazil (Rio de Janeiro)
Rhipsalis		Rhipsalis goebeliana Backeb.	Bolivia
Rhipsalis	R. grandiflora	Rhipsalis grandiflora Haw.	Brazil (Paraná, Rio de Janeiro, Santa Catarina, São Paulo)
Rhipsalis		Rhipsalis hileiabaiana (N.P.Taylor & Barthlott) N.Korotkova & Barthlott	Brazil (Bahia)
Rhipsalis		Rhipsalis hylaea F.Ritter	Peru
Rhipsalis	R. lindbergiana R. lindbergiana	Rhipsalis lindbergiana K.Schum.	Brazil (Bahia, Espírito Santo, Minas Gerais, Pernambuco, Rio de Janeiro, São Paulo, Sergipe)
Rhipsalis		Rhipsalis mesembryanthemoides Haw.	Brazil (Rio de Janeiro)
Rhipsalis	R. micrantha f. rauhiorum R. micrantha f. kirbergii R. micrantha f. micrantha	Rhipsalis micrantha (Kunth) DC.	Costa Rica, Ecuador, Peru, Venezuela
Rhipsalis		Rhipsalis oblonga Loefgr., syn. Rhipsalis crispimarginata	Brazil (Bahia, Espírito Santo, Rio de Janeiro, São Paulo)
Rhipsalis		Rhipsalis olivifera N.P.Taylor & Zappi	Brazil (Rio de Janeiro)
Rhipsalis		Rhipsalis occidentalis Barthlott & Rauh	Ecuador, Peru, Suriname
Rhipsalis	R. pachyptera	Rhipsalis pachyptera Pfeiff.	Brazil (Paraná, Rio de Janeiro, Rio Grande do Sul, Santa Catarina, São Paulo)
Rhipsalis	R. pentaptera	Rhipsalis pentaptera Pfeiff. ex A.Dietr.	Brazil (Rio de Janeiro)
Rhipsalis	R. rhombea R. rhombea	Rhipsalis rhombea (Salm-Dyck) Pfeiff.	Southeast Brazil
Rhipsalis		Rhipsalis russellii Britton & Rose	Brazil (Bahia, Espírito Santo, Minas Gerais)
Rhipsalis	R. shaferi	Rhipsalis shaferi Britton & Rose 2011	Paraguay, southern Bolivia, northern Argentina
Rhipsalis	R. sulcata R. sulcata	Rhipsalis sulcata F.A.C.Weber	Brazil (Espírito Santo)
Rhipsalis	R. teres R. teres forma teres R. teres f. capilliformis R. teres f. heteroclada R. teres f. prismatica	Rhipsalis teres (Vell.) Steud.	Brazil
Rhipsalis		Rhipsalis triangularis Werderm.	Brazil (Rio de Janeiro)
Unplaced		Rhipsalis trigonoides (Doweld) N.Korotkova	Brazil (São Paulo)

== Distribution and habitat ==
Rhipsalis is found as pendulous epiphyte in tropical rainforests, some species may also grow epilithic or, rarely, terrestrial. The genus is found widely in Central America, parts of the Caribbean and a great part of northern and central South America. The center of diversity of Rhipsalis lies in the rainforests of the Mata Atlantica in southeastern Brazil. It is found throughout the New World, and additionally in tropical Africa, Madagascar and Sri Lanka. It is the only cactus with a natural occurrence outside the New World.

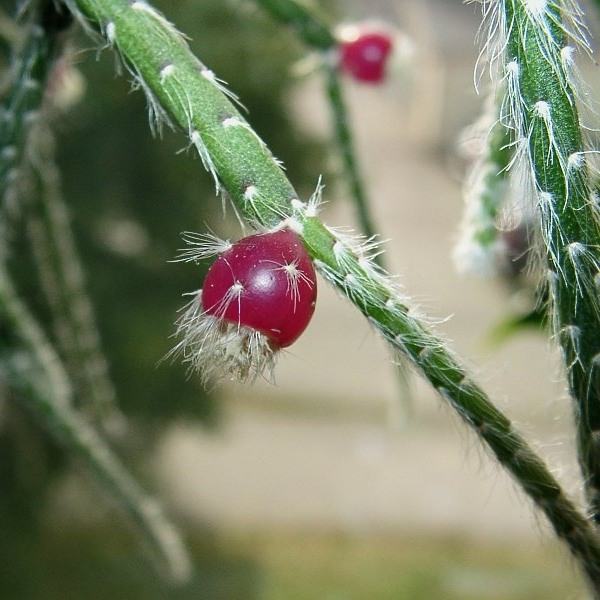
Rhipsalis pilocarpa fruit

== Literature ==
- Anderson, Edward F. (2001), The Cactus Family, Portland, Oregon: Timber Press, ISBN 0-88192-498-9
- Hunt, D.R., ed. (2006), The New Cactus Lexicon Text, Milborne Port: dh books, ISBN 0-9538134-5-2
- Barthlott, W.; Taylor, N.P. (1995), "Notes towards a Monograph of Rhipsalideae (Cactaceae)", Bradleya, 13 (13): 43–79, doi:10.25223/brad.n13.1995.a7, S2CID 89883634
- Media related to Rhipsalis at Wikimedia Commons
