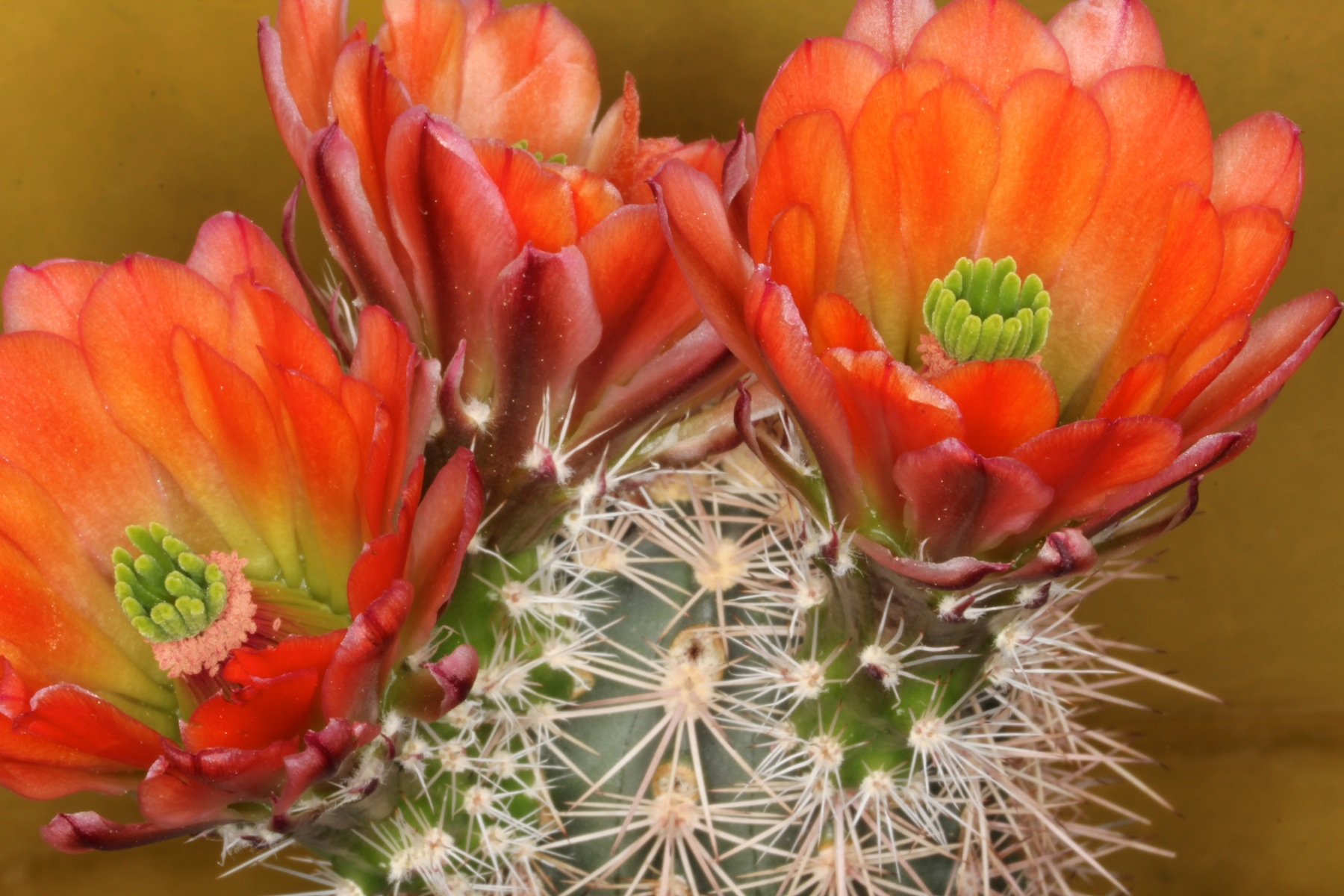

Scientific classification
- Kingdom: Plantae
- Clade: Tracheophytes
- Clade: Angiosperms
- Clade: Eudicots
- Order: Caryophyllales
- Family: Cactaceae
- Subfamily: Cactoideae
- Genus: Echinocereus
- Species: E. acifer

Binomial name
- Echinocereus acifer ((Otto ex Salm-Dyck) Jacobi

Synonyms
- Cereus acifer Otto ex Salm-Dyck 1850; Echinocereus triglochidiatus var. acifer (Otto ex Salm-Dyck) Bravo 1978; Echinocereus triglochidiatus subsp. acifer (Otto ex Salm-Dyck) U.Guzmán 2003; Echinocereus acifer subsp. acifer; Echinocereus acifer var. brevispinulus Jacobi 1885; Echinocereus acifer var. diversispinus K.Schum. 1898; Echinocereus acifer var. durangensis K.Schum. 1898; Echinocereus acifer var. tenuispinus Jacobi 1885; Echinocereus acifer var. trichacanthus Hildm. 1891; Echinocereus acifer subsp. tubiflorus W.Rischer 1998; Echinocereus acifer subsp. ventanensis W.Rischer 2009; Echinocereus polyacanthus var. densus (Regel) N.P.Taylor 1984; Echinopsis valida var. densa Regel 1852

= Echinocereus acifer =

Species of cactus

Echinocereus acifer is a species of Echinocereus cactus found in Mexico

== Description ==
The plant sprouts from the base, forming small cushions of 5 to 8 stems. The dark green, cylindrical plant body grows to a height of 10 to 40 cm (3.9 to 15.7 in) and a diameter of 5 to 10 cm (2.0 to 3.9 in). It has 9 to 12 heavily warty, tuberous ribs. The tomentose areoles on new shoots are 1 to 1.5 cm (0.39 to 0.59 in) apart and about 3 mm (0.12 in) in diameter. The thorns are yellow to reddish-brown, later turning gray, with up to 5 central spines surrounded by 10 to 15 radiating marginal spines.

Buds emerge from a woolly white pad with reddish-brown bristles. The funnel-shaped flowers are red on the outside and yellow on the inside, rarely crooked, and measure 8 to 12 cm (3.1 to 4.7 in) long with a diameter of up to 10 cm (3.9 in). Unlike the monoecious flowers of Echinocereus polyacanthus, the flowers of Echinocereus acifer are hermaphroditic and self-pollinating. The stamens are yellow, and the stigma is green to light green. The oval fruits remain greenish, measuring 2 cm (0.79 in) in diameter and 3 cm (1.2 in) in length.

== Distribution ==
Echinocereus acifer is found in the Mexican states of Guanajuato, Zacatecas, San Luis Potosí, and Durango, typically growing in rocky forest areas, moss, or rock crevices.

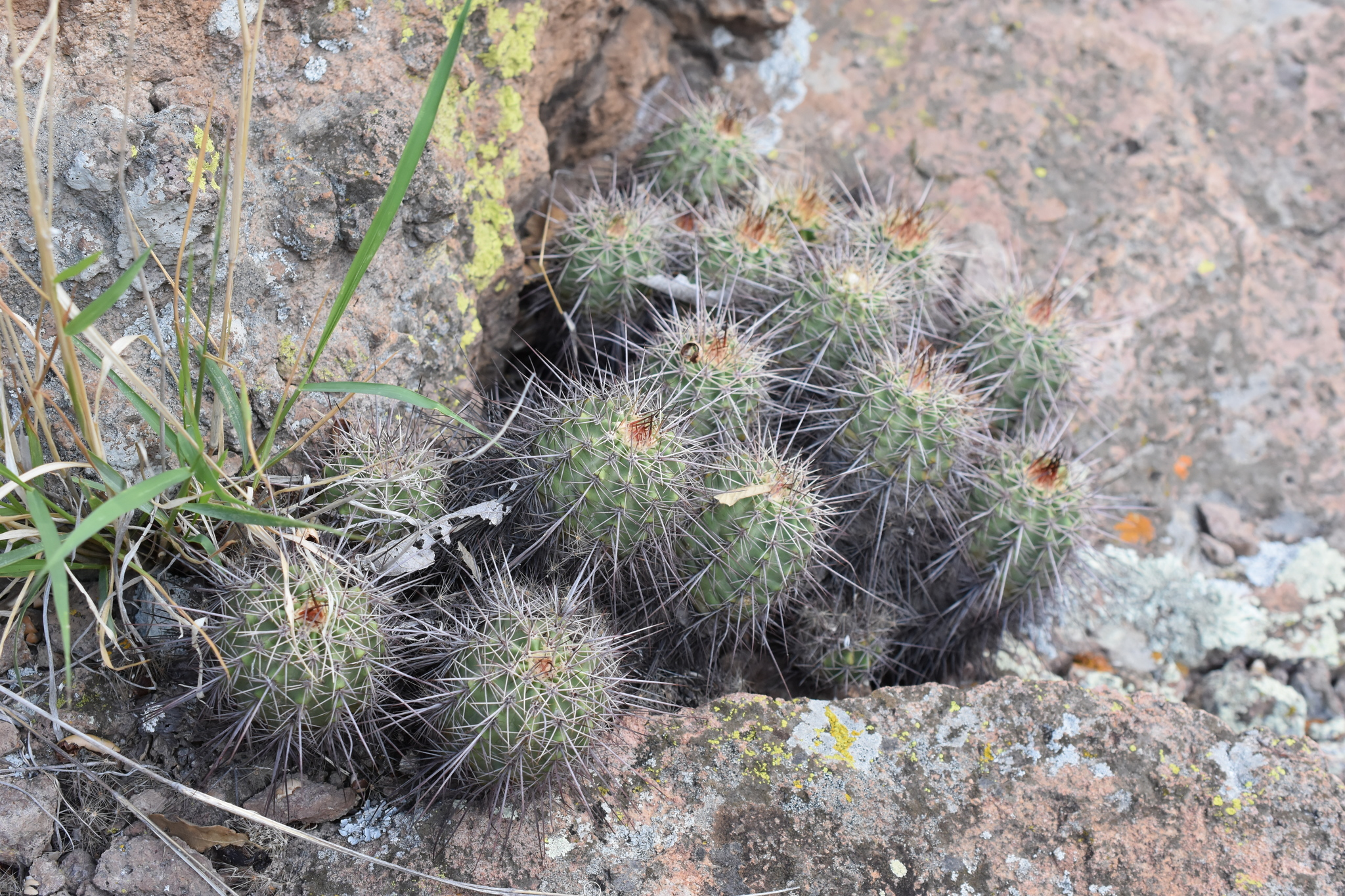
Habitat in La Purísima de Oriente, Guanajuato, Mexico

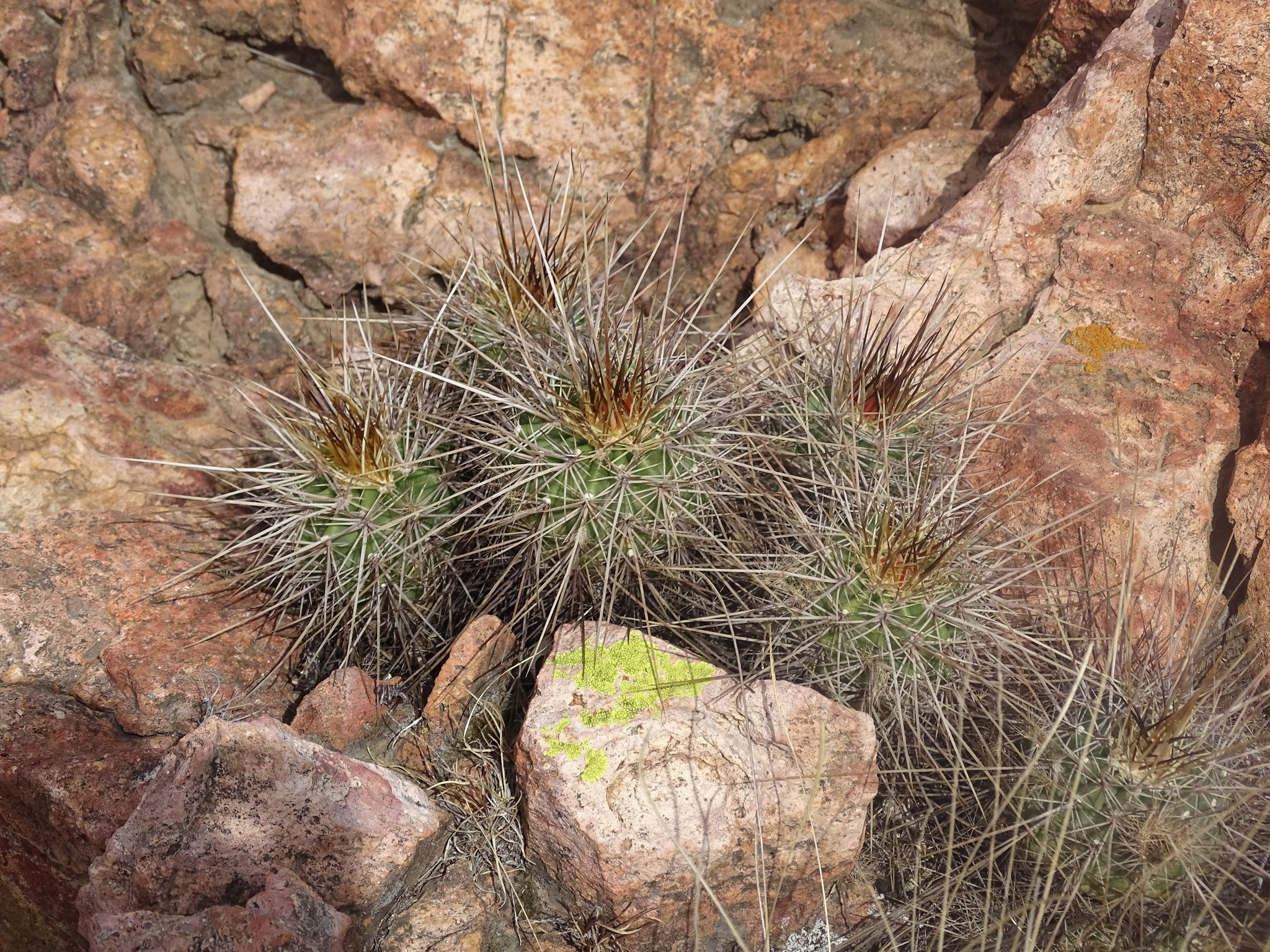
Habitat in Saucito del Poleo, Zacatecas, Mexico

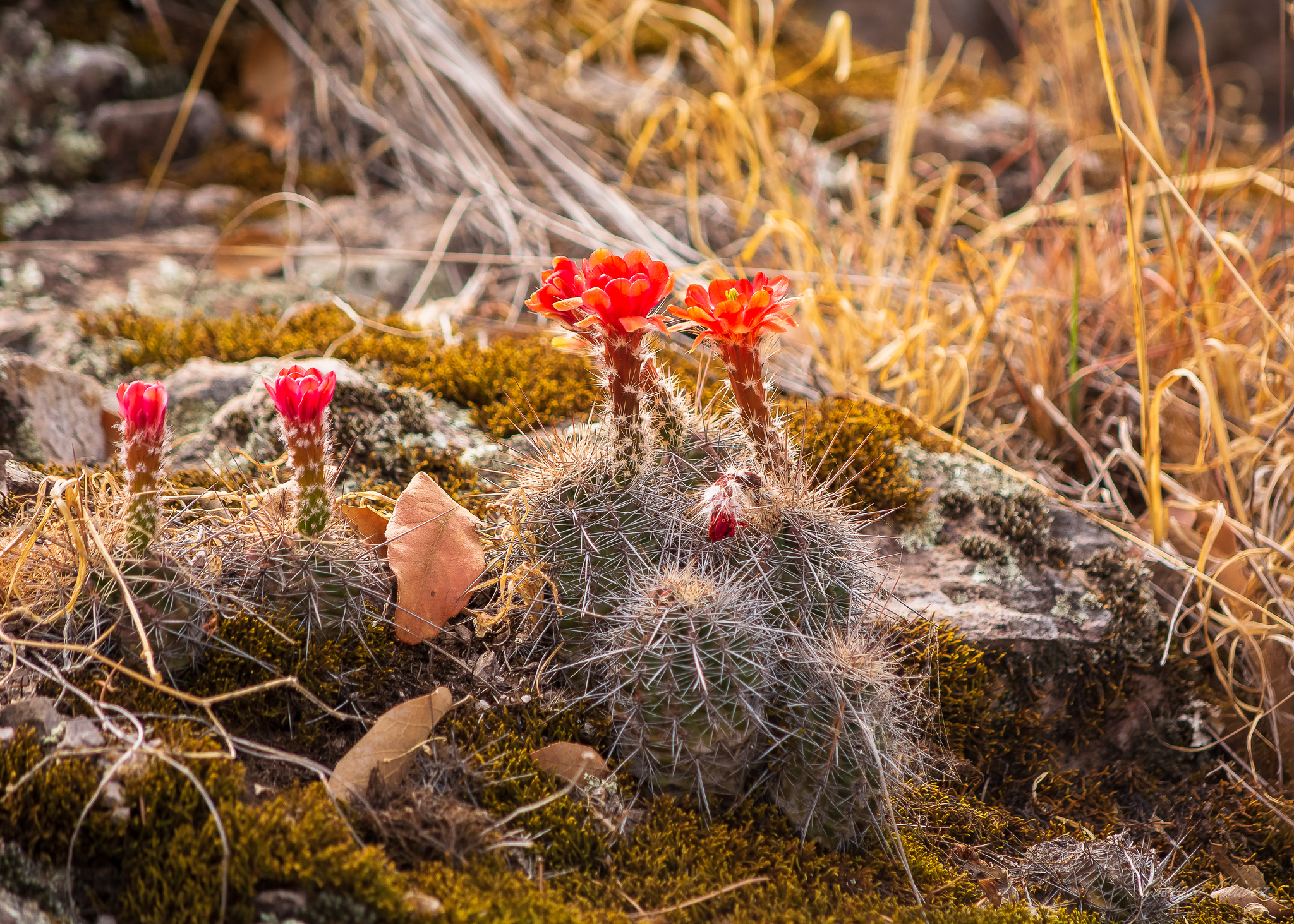
Habitat in Las Margaritas, Durango, Mexico

== Taxonomy ==
First described as Cereus acifer in 1850 by Joseph zu Salm-Reifferscheidt-Dyck, Georg Albano von Jacobi reclassified it into the genus Echinocereus in 1856. The specific epithet acifer comes from the Latin words "acus" (needle) and "-fer" (bearing), referring to the plant's thorniness.
