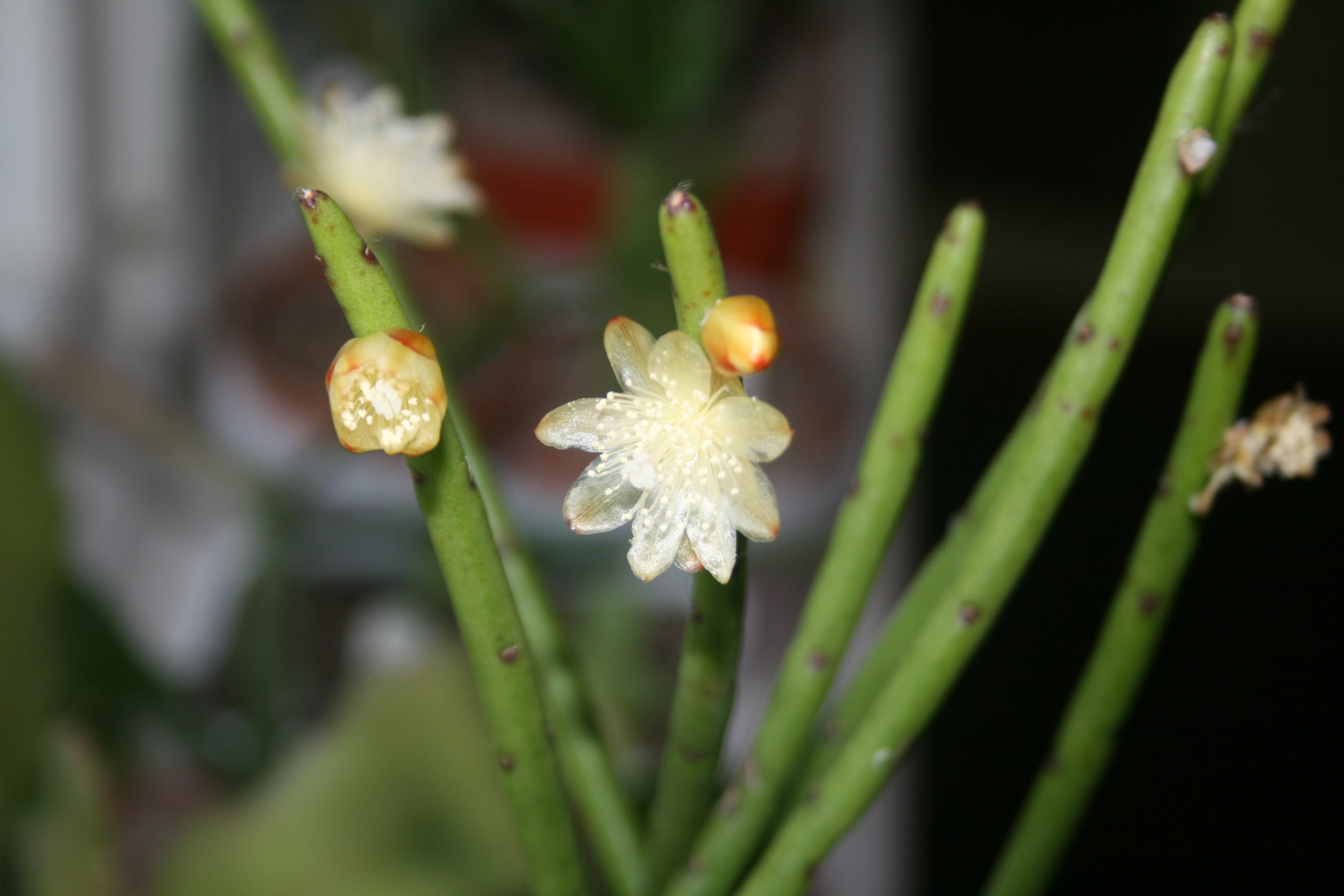

Conservation status
- Least Concern (IUCN 3.1)

Scientific classification
- Kingdom: Plantae
- Clade: Tracheophytes
- Clade: Angiosperms
- Clade: Eudicots
- Order: Caryophyllales
- Family: Cactaceae
- Subfamily: Cactoideae
- Genus: Rhipsalis
- Species: R. floccosa

Binomial name
- Rhipsalis floccosa Salm-Dyck ex Pfeiffer

Synonyms
- Hariota floccosa Cels ex C.F.Först.; Hariota floccosa Kuntze; Hatiora floccosa (Salm-Dyck ex Pfeiff.) Lem.; Hylorhipsalis floccosa (Salm-Dyck ex Pfeiff.) Doweld; Lepismium floccosum (Salm-Dyck ex Pfeiff.) Backeb.; Lepismium tucumanense (F.A.C. Weber) Backeb.; Rhipsalis tucumanensis F.A.C. Weber

= Rhipsalis floccosa =

Species of cactus

Rhipsalis floccosa is a species of plant in the family Cactaceae. It is found in Argentina, Bolivia, Brazil, Paraguay, Peru, and Venezuela. Its natural habitat is subtropical or tropical moist lowland forest. It is threatened by habitat loss.
