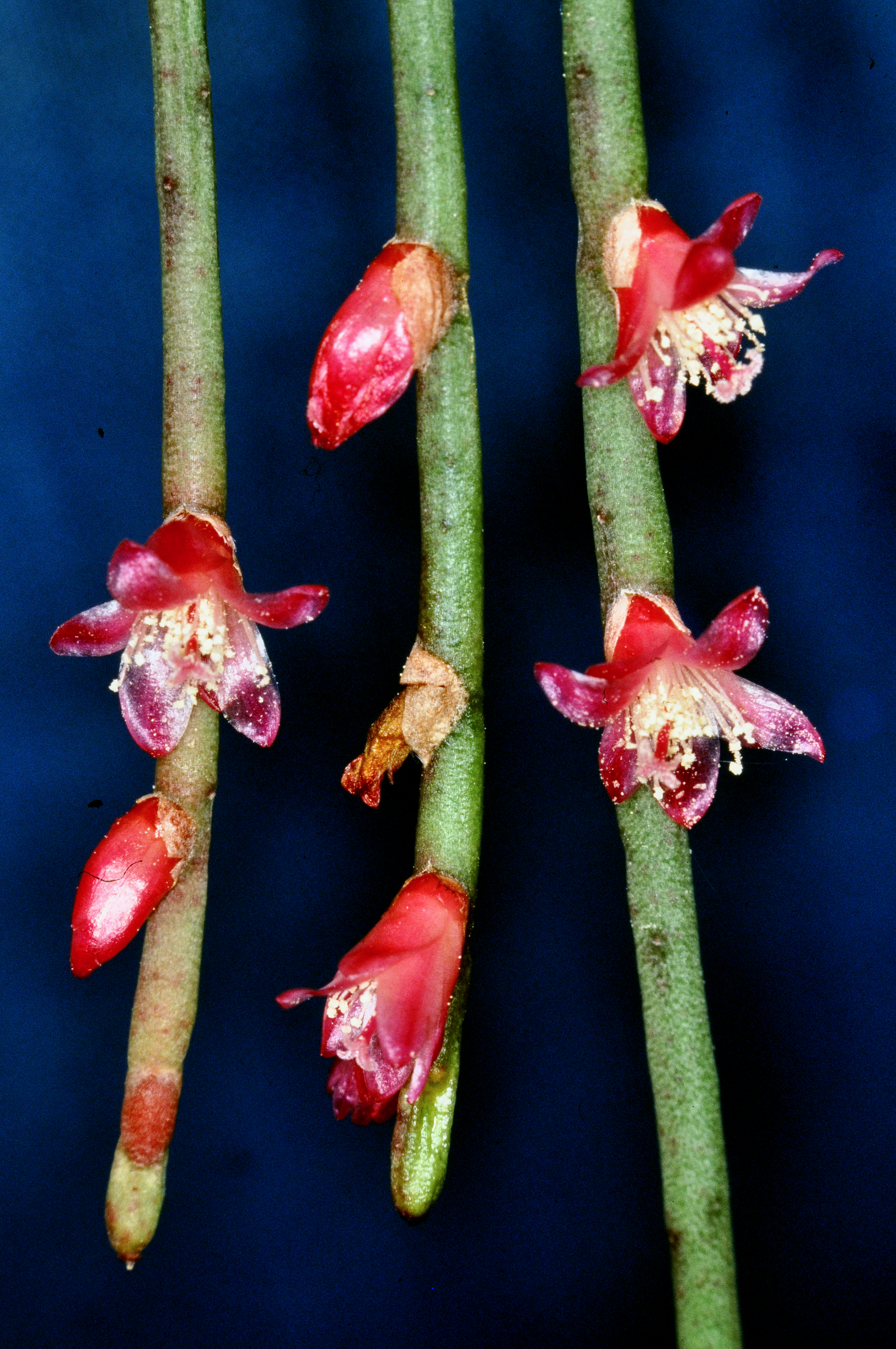

Conservation status
- Data Deficient (IUCN 3.1)

Scientific classification
- Kingdom: Plantae
- Clade: Tracheophytes
- Clade: Angiosperms
- Clade: Eudicots
- Order: Caryophyllales
- Family: Cactaceae
- Subfamily: Cactoideae
- Genus: Rhipsalis
- Species: R. hoelleri

Binomial name
- Rhipsalis hoelleri Barthlott & N.P.Taylor

= Rhipsalis hoelleri =

Species of cactus

Rhipsalis hoelleri is a species of plant in the family Cactaceae. It is endemic to Brazil. Its natural habitat is subtropical or tropical moist lowland forests. It is threatened by habitat loss.
