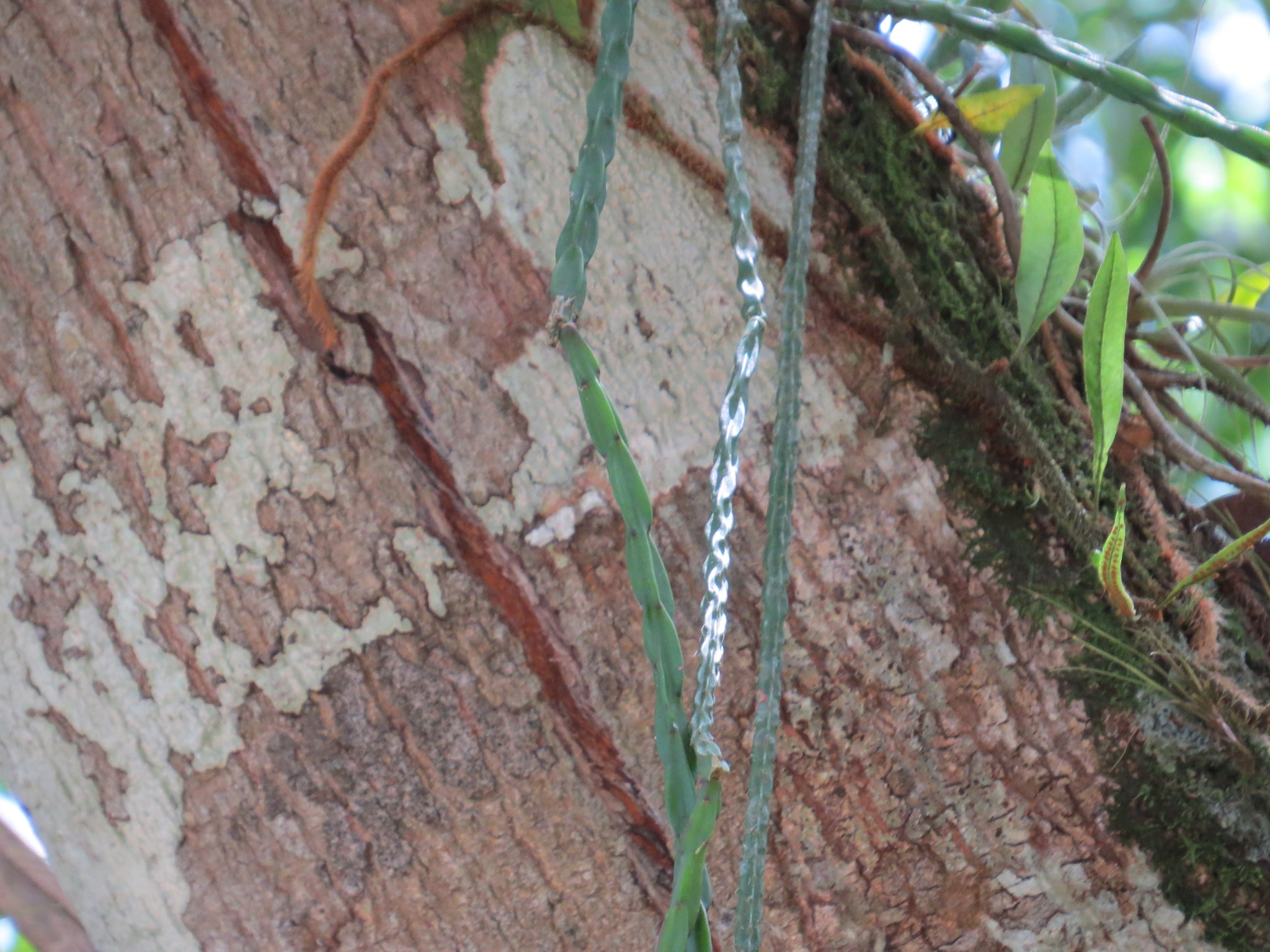

Conservation status
- Endangered (IUCN 3.1)

Scientific classification
- Kingdom: Plantae
- Clade: Tracheophytes
- Clade: Angiosperms
- Clade: Eudicots
- Order: Caryophyllales
- Family: Cactaceae
- Subfamily: Cactoideae
- Genus: Rhipsalis
- Species: R. pacheco-leonis

Binomial name
- Rhipsalis pacheco-leonis Loefgr.

= Rhipsalis pacheco-leonis =

Species of cactus

Rhipsalis pacheco-leonis is a species of plant in the family Cactaceae. It is endemic to Brazil. Its natural habitats are subtropical or tropical moist lowland forests and rocky areas. It is threatened by habitat loss. It needs water and sunlight.
