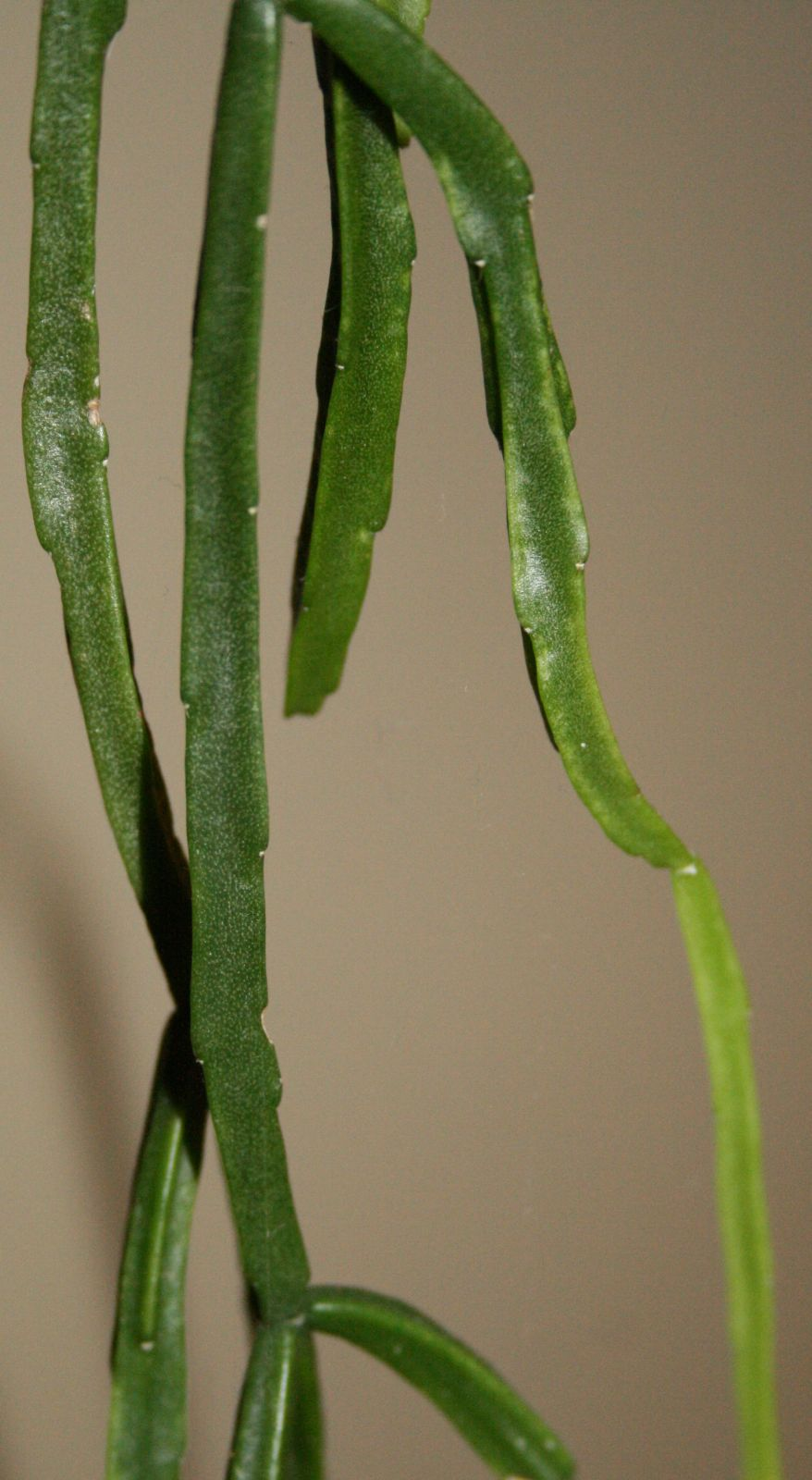

Conservation status
- Data Deficient (IUCN 3.1)

Scientific classification
- Kingdom: Plantae
- Clade: Tracheophytes
- Clade: Angiosperms
- Clade: Eudicots
- Order: Caryophyllales
- Family: Cactaceae
- Subfamily: Cactoideae
- Genus: Rhipsalis
- Species: R. sulcata

Binomial name
- Rhipsalis sulcata F A.C.Weber

= Rhipsalis sulcata =

Species of cactus

Rhipsalis sulcata is a species of plant in the genus Rhipsalis and family Cactaceae. It is endemic to Brazil. Its natural habitats are subtropical or tropical moist lowland forests and rocky areas. It is threatened by habitat loss.
