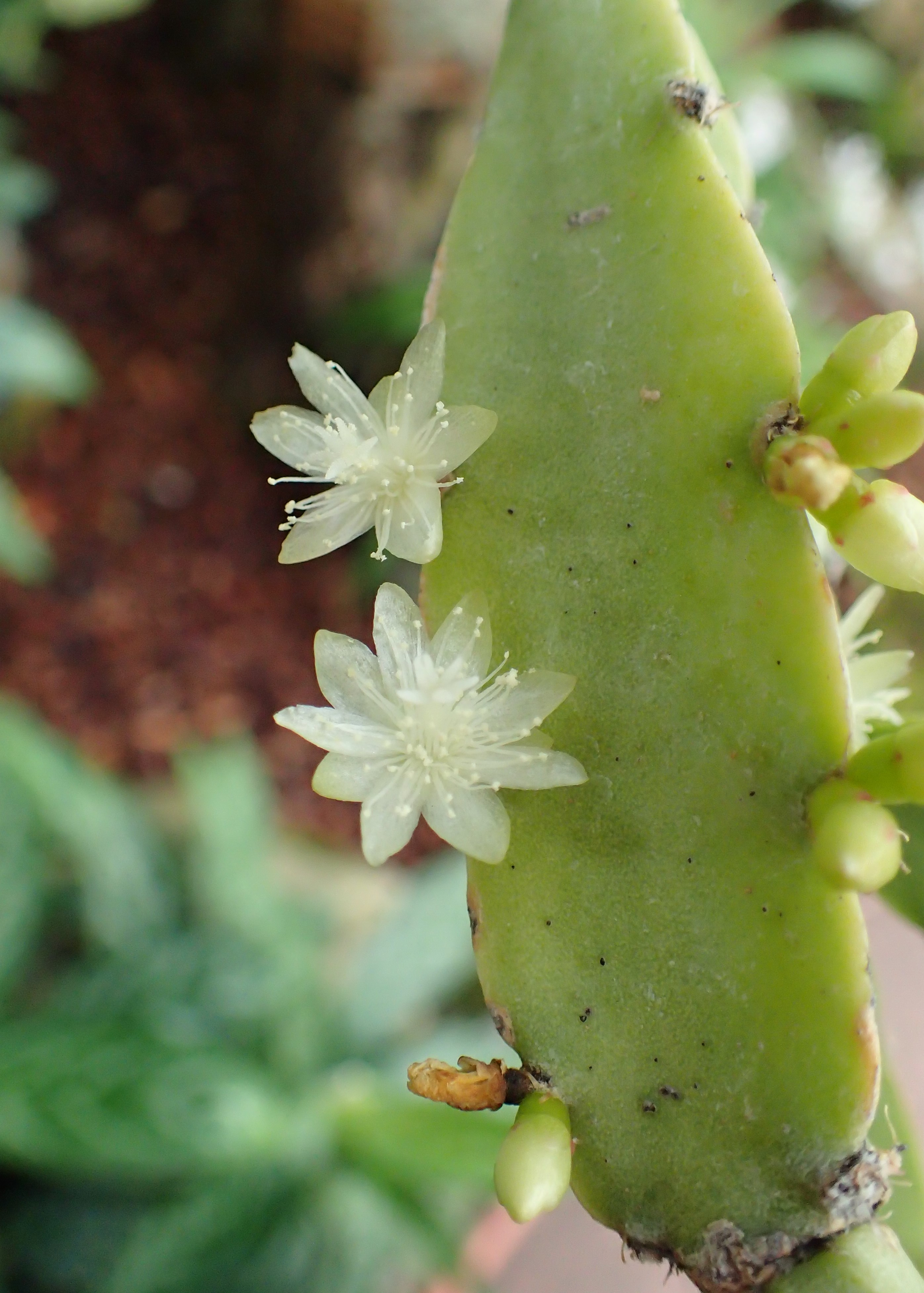

Conservation status
- Near Threatened (IUCN 3.1)

Scientific classification
- Kingdom: Plantae
- Clade: Tracheophytes
- Clade: Angiosperms
- Clade: Eudicots
- Order: Caryophyllales
- Family: Cactaceae
- Subfamily: Cactoideae
- Genus: Rhipsalis
- Species: R. cereoides

Binomial name
- Rhipsalis cereoides (Backeb. & Voll) Backeb.

= Rhipsalis cereoides =

Species of cactus

Rhipsalis cereoides is a species of plant in the family Cactaceae. It is endemic to Brazil. Its natural habitats are subtropical or tropical moist lowland forests and rocky areas. It is threatened by habitat loss.
