= Constance de Salm =

French poet and writer

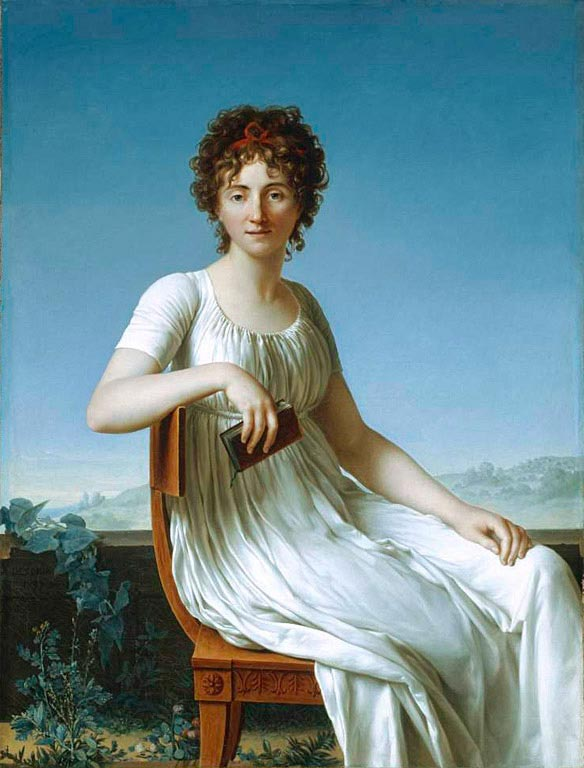
Jean-Baptiste François Desoria's portrait of Constance Pipelet de Leury

Princess Constance de Salm (7 September 1767 – 13 April 1845) was a French poet and miscellaneous writer. She wrote a series of poetical "Epistles", one "To Women", another "On the Blindness of this Age". She also wrote, My Threescore Years (1833); The Twenty-Four Hours of a Sensible Woman; and Cantata on the Marriage of Napoleon. Through her second marriage, she became Princess of Salm-Reifferscheid-Dyck. Salm was "the first woman to be admitted to the Lyceum des Arts".

== Early years ==
Constance-Marie de Théis was born in Nantes on 7 September 1767 and baptized in the parish of Saint-Similien. Her father, Marie-Alexandre de Théis (1738–1796), a Royal prosecutor for Chauny, member of an old, but minor French noble family, was a poet who wrote comedies. Her mother, Anne Marie Quillau (b. 1746), belonged to a bourgeoisie family of rich merchants. Her brother, Alexandre Étienne Guillaume, Baron de Théis (1765–1832), was also a noted writer who served as Mayor of Laon. During her childhood, her father retired and moved his family to Picardy, their family seat, where she received a "brilliant education". At the age of fifteen, she spoke several languages, and learned musical composition. She also took an early interest in literature, especially poetry.

== Career ==
In 1789, she married Jean-Baptiste Pipelet de Leury (1759–1823), a surgeon, whose father had been ennobled by a charge of the King, and established herself in Paris, where various pieces of her writing were published in the Almanac des Muses and other periodicals.

In 1794, the theater of the Rue de Louvois performed her, Sapho, tragedie melee de chants, a lyric tragedy in three acts and in verse, with music by Jean-Paul-Égide Martini. This piece, which was preceded by a precise description of the life of Sappho, was quite successful, with more than a hundred performances. She dedicated it to her father, who died in 1796. She continued to provide fugitive pieces to newspapers and collections. She soon found a place for herself in the top rank of women poets, after writing a series of poems, which she styled as "Epitres" (Epistles), the first of which, in 1797 was "Epitre aux femmes", (Epistle to Women) and the most notable, "Epitre surl'aveuglementdu siecle" (On the Blindness of this Age). Others included "Messoixanto ana" (1833), "Les vingt-quatre heures d'une femme sensible", "Pensdes", and "Cantate sur le manage de Napoleon". Poetical "Epistles", "Dramas", and various other productions in verse, read by Pipelet at the Athenaeum at Paris, and afterwards published, obtained for her an honorable reputation in the literary world. She also published several ballads, of which she composed the melodies and the piano accompaniments.

Salm divorced in 1799. She wrote about it in a piece entitled "le Divorce, ou Conseils dune Mère a sa Fille" (Divorce, or Advice from a Mother to her Daughter). In 1800, the drama, Camille, ou Amitié et imprudence, was withdrawn by Salm after its first performance because of a poor reception, and she did not write for the stage again.

In 1803, she married Count Joseph zu Salm-Reifferscheidt-Dyck, who took the title of prince in 1816. After this marriage, Salm published as the Princesse de Salm. She lived alternately on the estates of her husband, in Germany, and at Paris, where, by her wit, her conversational powers, and her amiable manners, she rallied round her the elite of artists, and people of letters. The numerous productions of Salm were printed under the title, Poésies de la princesse Constance de Salm (Poems of the Princess Constance of Salm) in Paris by Didot, in 1811 and a more comprehensive edition in 1817. Salm's poetic works are distinguished by a firm and frank pace, by force of thought, philosophical spirit, and by the habit of using the proper word, which contributes to rendering her style as clear, natural and energetic, without taking away elegance and grace. In June 1833, Salm published, Mes Soixante ans, ou Mes Souvenirs politiques et litteraires (My Sixty Years, or My Political and Literary Memories) (Paris, Bertrand, Didot). Although praised by several newspapers, this work was considered to be mediocre.

Salm died in Paris on 13 April 1845.
