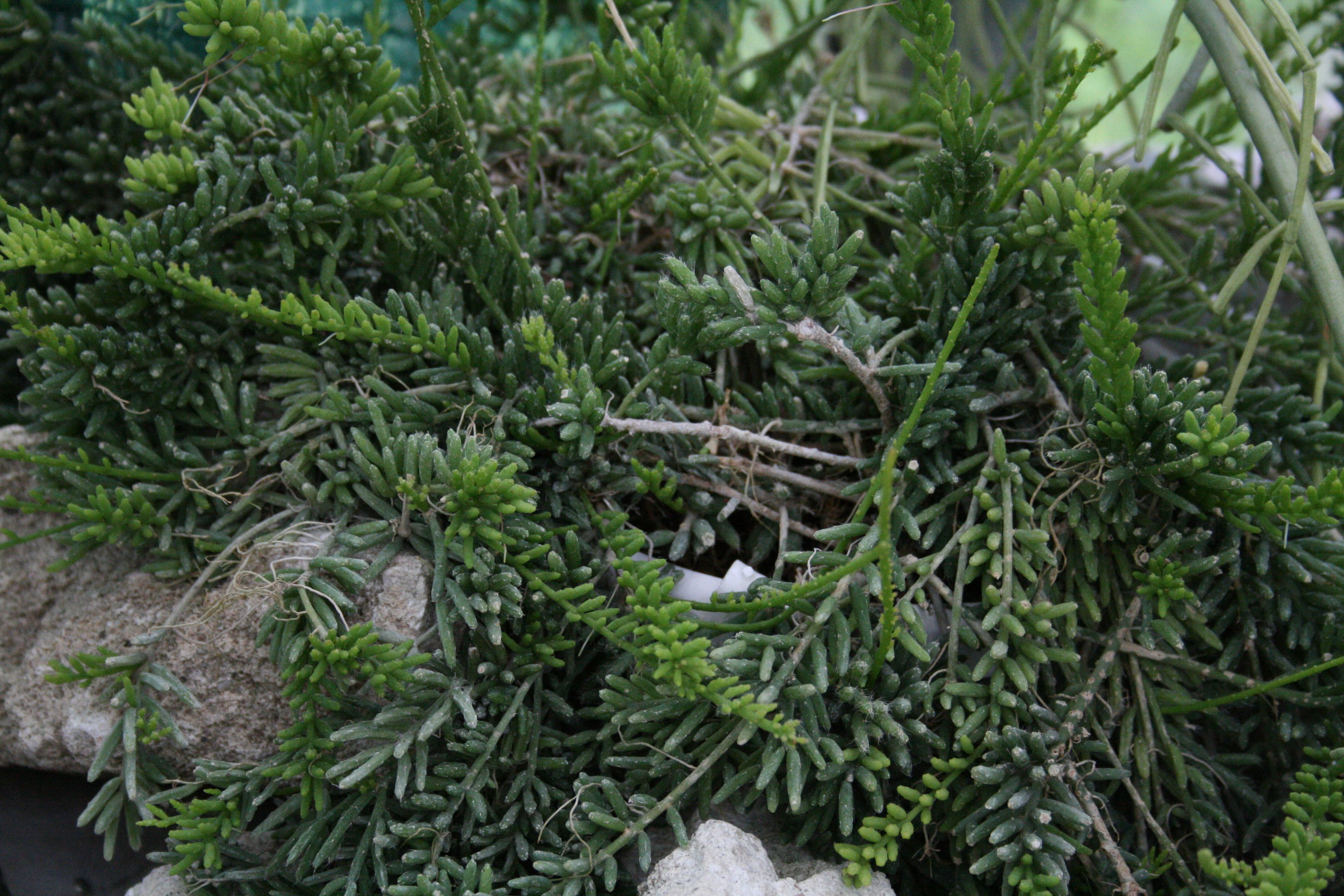
- Rhipsalis mesembryanthemoides

Conservation status
- Critically Endangered (IUCN 3.1)

Scientific classification
- Kingdom: Plantae
- Clade: Tracheophytes
- Clade: Angiosperms
- Clade: Eudicots
- Order: Caryophyllales
- Family: Cactaceae
- Subfamily: Cactoideae
- Genus: Rhipsalis
- Species: R. mesembryanthemoides

Binomial name
- Rhipsalis mesembryanthemoides Haw.

Synonyms
- Hariota mesembryanthemoides; Rhipsalis echinata

= Rhipsalis mesembryanthemoides =

Species of cactus

Rhipsalis mesembryanthemoides is a cactus in the genus Rhipsalis of the family Cactaceae. The first description was in 1821 by Adrian Hardy Haworth. The shoots are reminiscent of the plants of the genus Mesembryanthemum, hence the epithet mesembryanthemoides.

== Description ==
Rhipsalis mesembryanthemoides is an epiphytic plant with strong stems covered by tiny branchlets. Initially this plant grows erect; later it is pendent. The main branches are elongated, cylindrical and woody, 10 to 20 inches long and 1 to 2 millimeters in diameter. The white flowers appear at areoles of the branchlets. They are 8 millimeters long and reach a diameter of 15 millimeters. The short-oblong fruits are white, about 5 millimeters long.

== Distribution ==
This species is widespread in the Brazilian state of Rio de Janeiro, on both sides of the Baía da Guanabara, at an altitude below 600 metres (2,000 ft) above sea level.

== Gallery ==
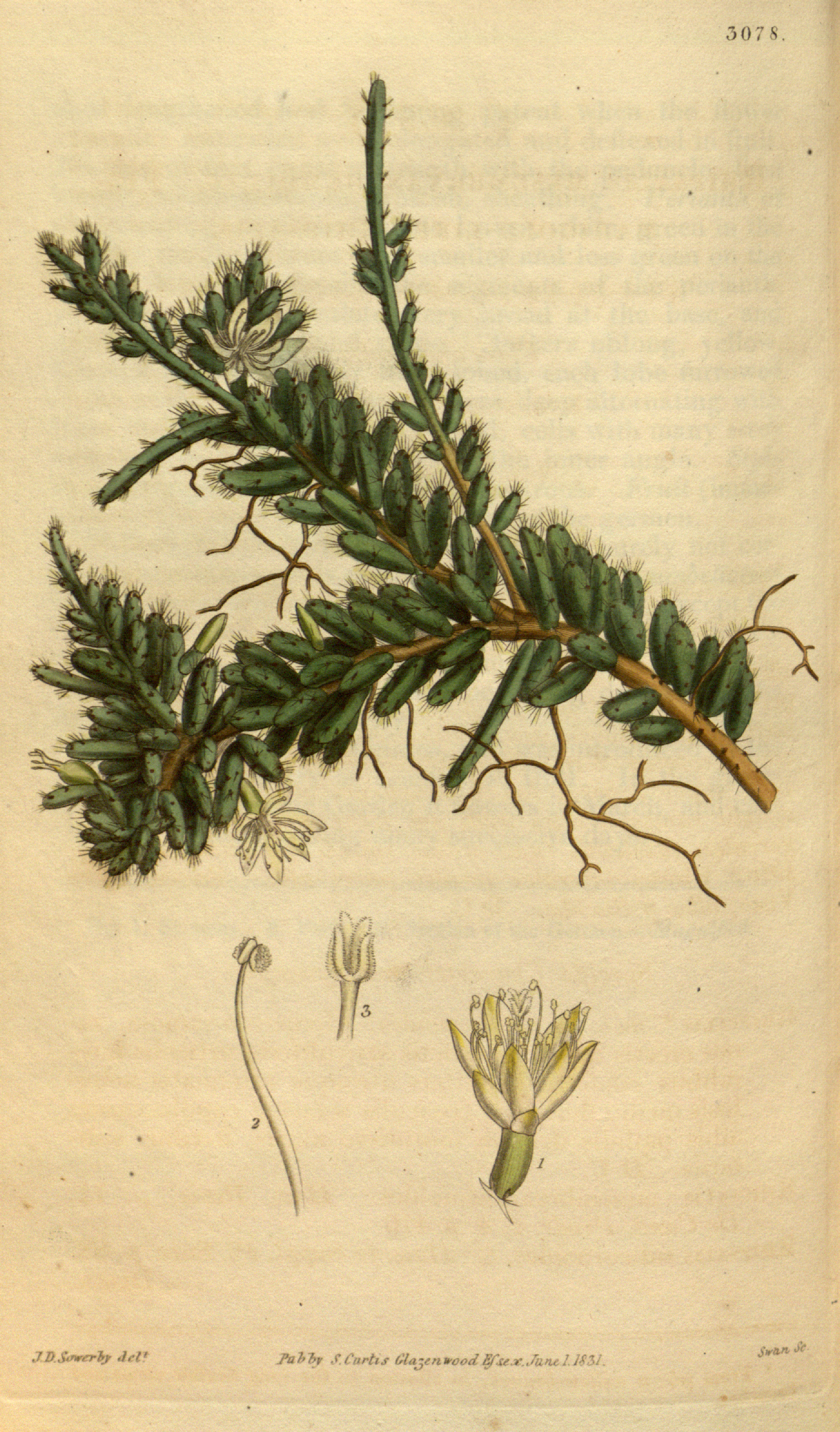
Plate from Curtis's Botanical Magazine, Volume 58.

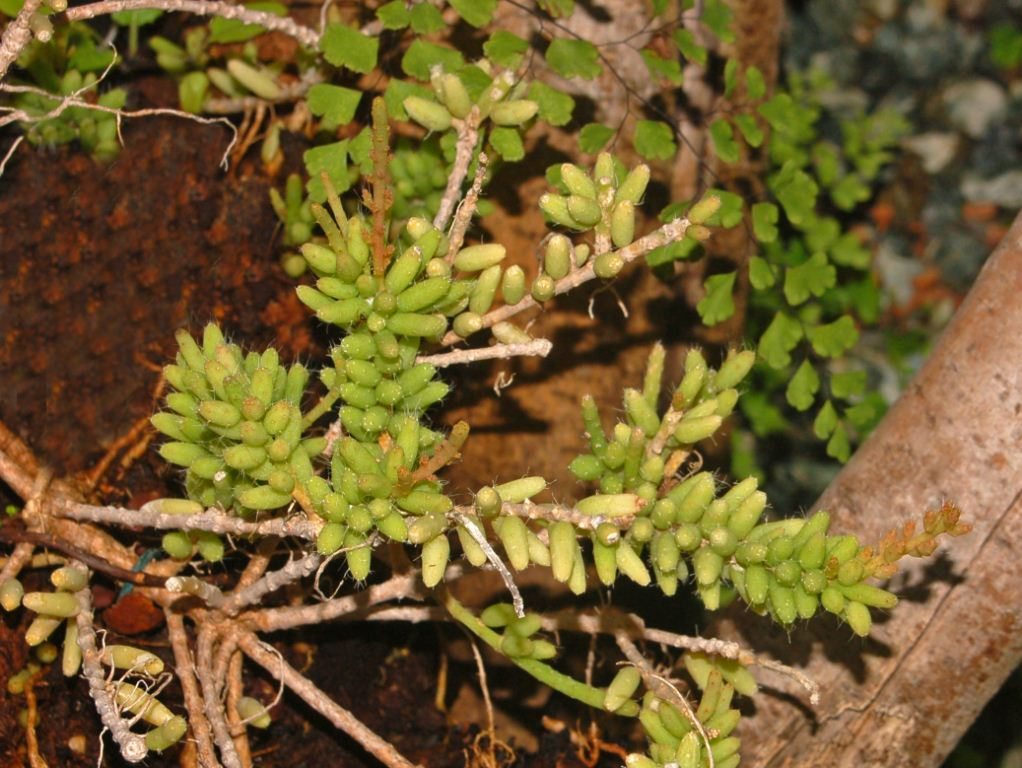
Rhipsalis mesembryanthemoides at the botanical garden of Villa Durazzo-Pallavicini, Genova Pegli

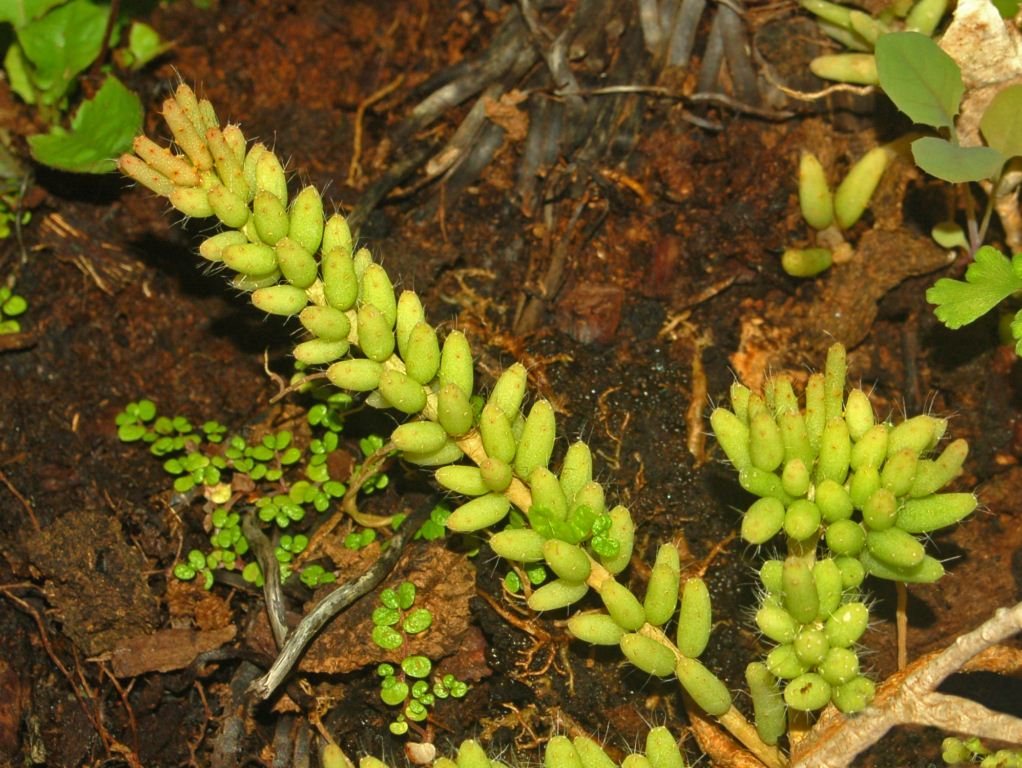
Branch of Rhipsalis mesembryanthemoides
