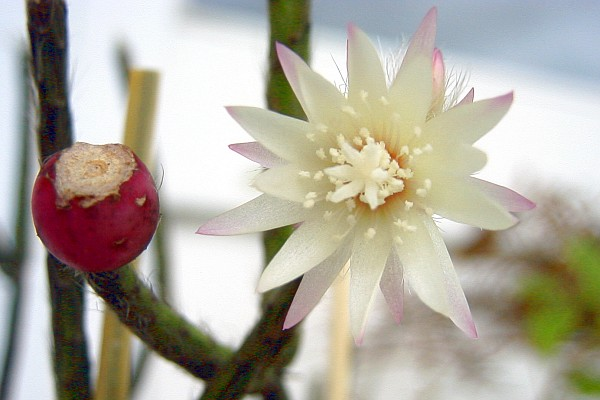
- Fruit and flower

Conservation status
- Vulnerable (IUCN 3.1)

Scientific classification
- Kingdom: Plantae
- Clade: Tracheophytes
- Clade: Angiosperms
- Clade: Eudicots
- Order: Caryophyllales
- Family: Cactaceae
- Subfamily: Cactoideae
- Genus: Rhipsalis
- Species: R. pilocarpa

Binomial name
- Rhipsalis pilocarpa Loefgr.

= Rhipsalis pilocarpa =

Species of cactus

Rhipsalis pilocarpa, the hairy-fruited wickerware cactus, is a species of flowering plant in the cactus family that is endemic to Brazil. Scarce in the wild, it is known only in a small number of isolated locations. Its status is listed as "vulnerable" by the IUCN Red List. However, it is cultivated as an ornamental houseplant and as such has gained the Royal Horticultural Society's Award of Garden Merit.

== Description ==
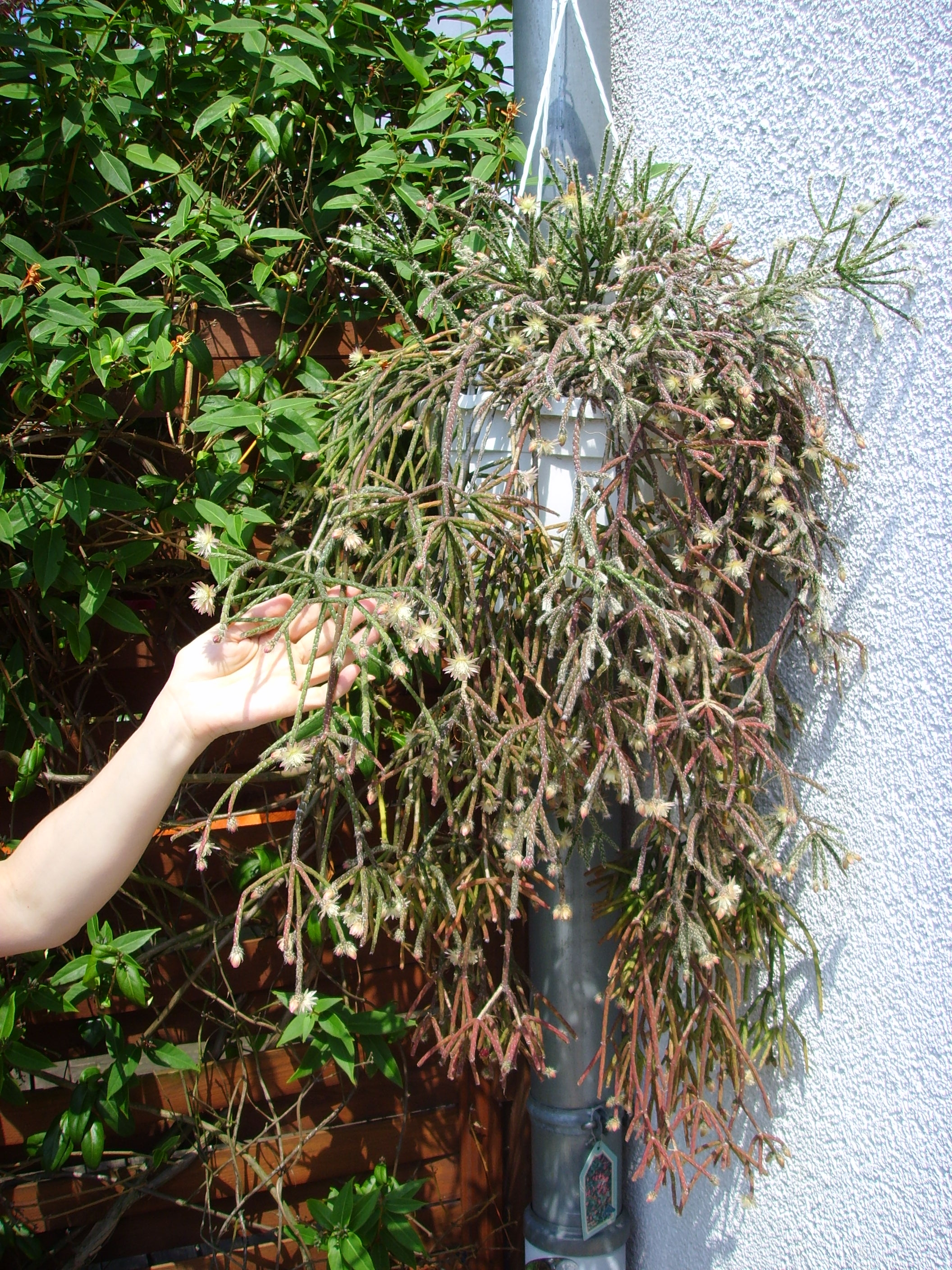
The plant suspended in a basket.

In the wild Rhipsalis pilocarpa is an epiphyte, using a host tree for support but not parasitising or otherwise harming its host. Growing to 50 cm (20 in) tall and broad, its slim cylindrical stems are at first erect, becoming pendent with short straight branches arranged in whorls. The stems are crassulent, segmented and potentially dividing after each segment. It is one of the Rhipsalis in which the spines are still visible, especially on the young stems.

It grows as a small epiphytic shrub with initially upright and later hanging shoots. The dirty gray-green shoots are slender cylindrical, completely turning, up to 4 inches long and 0.6 inches in diameter. At the top, they branch into whorls. The 8 to 10 almost always pronounced ribs are finely striped in the longitudinal and transverse direction. The green, somewhat woolly areoles are occasionally purplish. From them arise 3 to 10 gray to white, bristle-like thorns.

The fragrant, white, terminal flowers appear alone or in pairs and reach a diameter of 2.5 to 4 centimeters. The pericarp is covered with bristle-like spines. The wine-red, berry-shaped fruits are spherical and studded with bristle-like spines. They have a length and a diameter of about 12 millimeters. The fruits contain quite large, black seeds. It has been shown that viviparity exists in this species, that is, the seed can germinate very early, while it is still in the fruit attached to the mother plant.

== Cultivation ==
Relatively easy to cultivate, R. pilocarpa grows best in partial shade, imitating its natural environment. It is particularly suitable as a hanging plant. With a minimum temperature of 10 °C (50 °F) it requires the protection of glass in temperate locations, at least during the winter months. The plant thrives acidic soil, good light and well drained (e.g. 2 part peat moss, 2 for 1 part of sand, with small bark chips added to increase the drainage and as a carbon source in a period of growth). These plants have low nutrient requirements in nature, so balanced commercial fertilizers should be diluted to half the recommended concentration on the label.

In winter, a night temperature of 9/10 °C and a low watering (without fertilizer) will favor the spring bloom. When the flower buds appear, normal watering can resume, as well as fertilization.

Propagation is done from cuttings or plants, and from the wild from fruits, whose seeds are carried by the animals that ate them.

== Range ==
This epiphyte is native to Brazil, where it lives in tropical subtropical or tropical forests, hanging or hanging on branches or growing in the hollow of old trees. The main threat to the species is the rapid decline of the primary tropical forest (destruction and fragmentation of habitats, deforestation, etc.). Therefore, the species is classified as vulnerable.

== Gallery ==
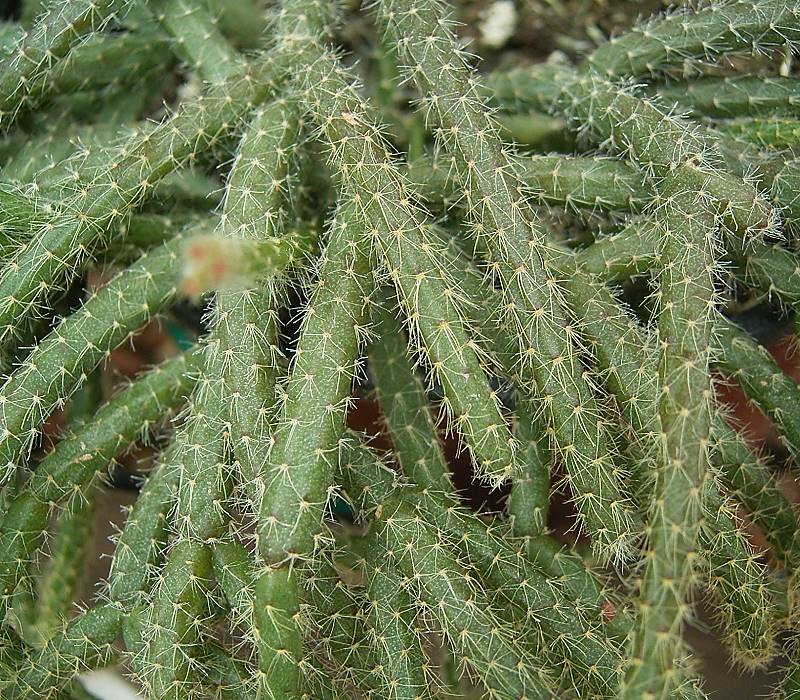
Closeup of thorny stems

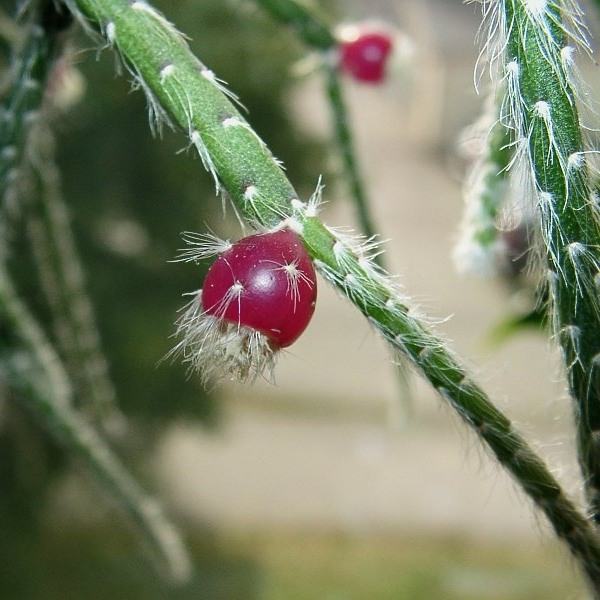
Ripe fruits on stem

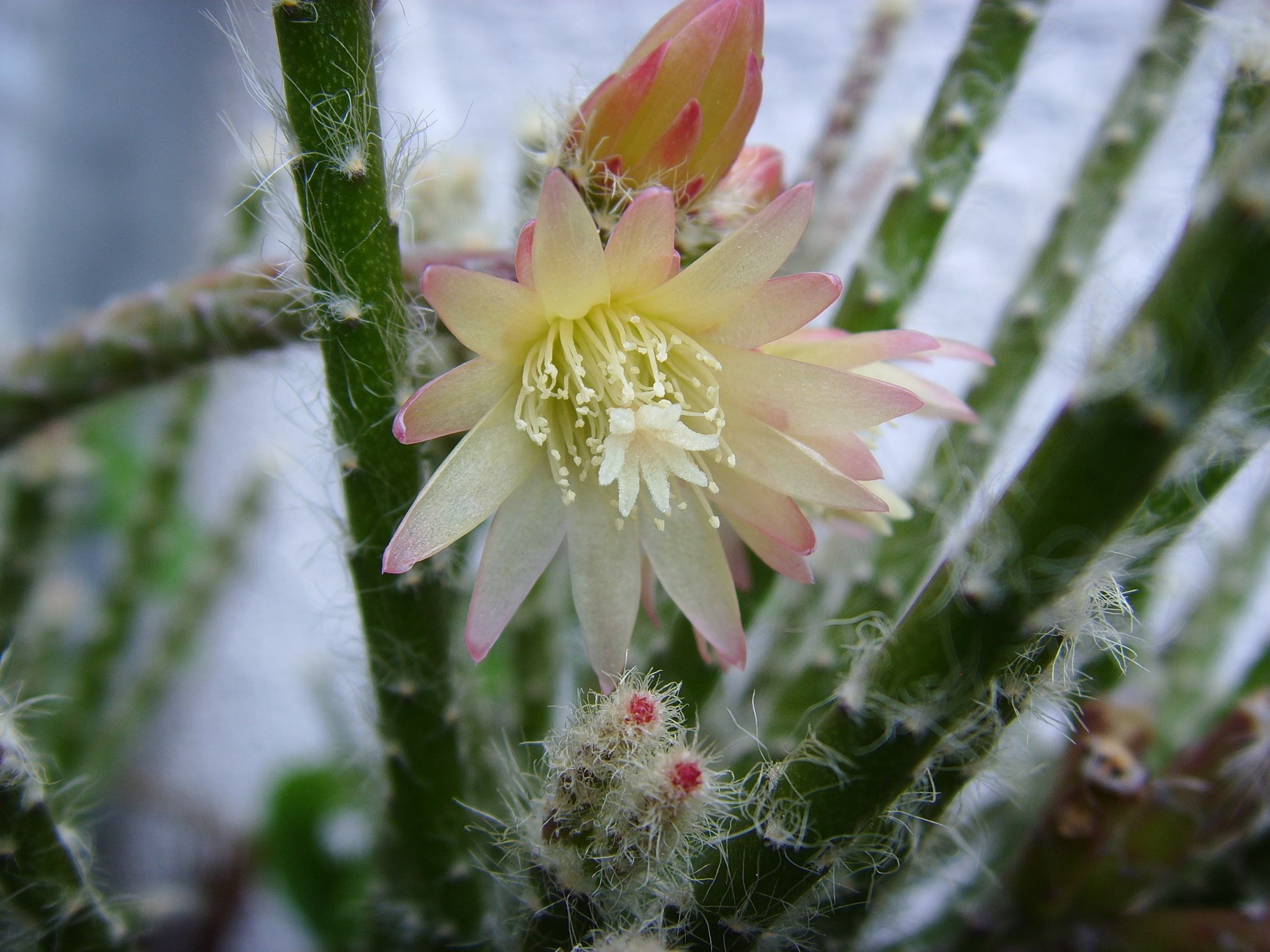
Flower

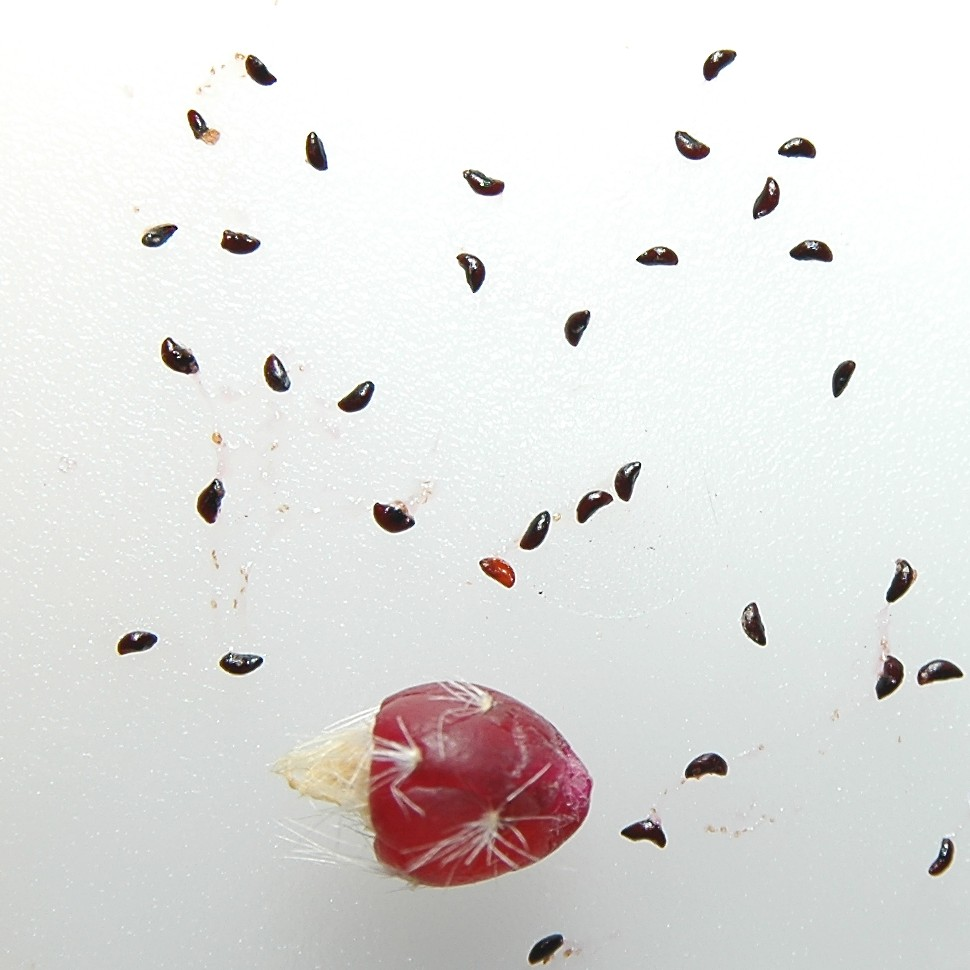
Ripe fruit and seeds
