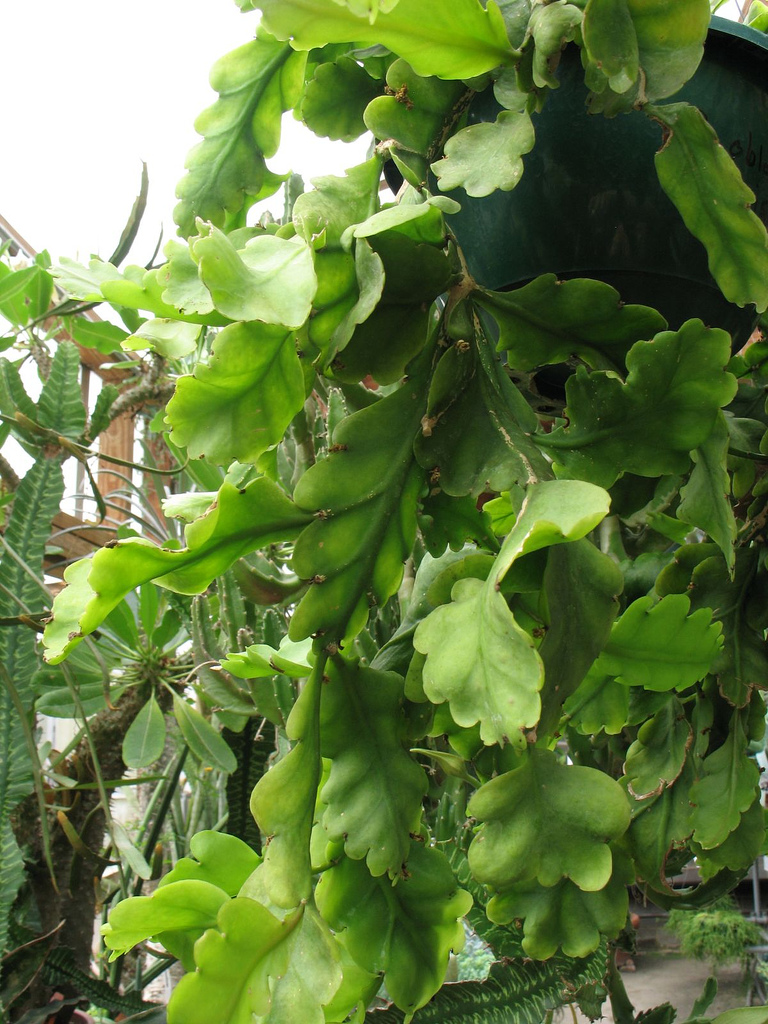

Conservation status
- Vulnerable (IUCN 3.1)

Scientific classification
- Kingdom: Plantae
- Clade: Tracheophytes
- Clade: Angiosperms
- Clade: Eudicots
- Order: Caryophyllales
- Family: Cactaceae
- Subfamily: Cactoideae
- Genus: Rhipsalis
- Species: R. oblonga

Binomial name
- Rhipsalis oblonga Loefgr.

= Rhipsalis oblonga =

Species of cactus

Rhipsalis oblonga is a species of plant in the family Cactaceae. It is endemic to Brazil. Its natural habitat is subtropical or tropical moist lowland forests. It is threatened by habitat loss.
