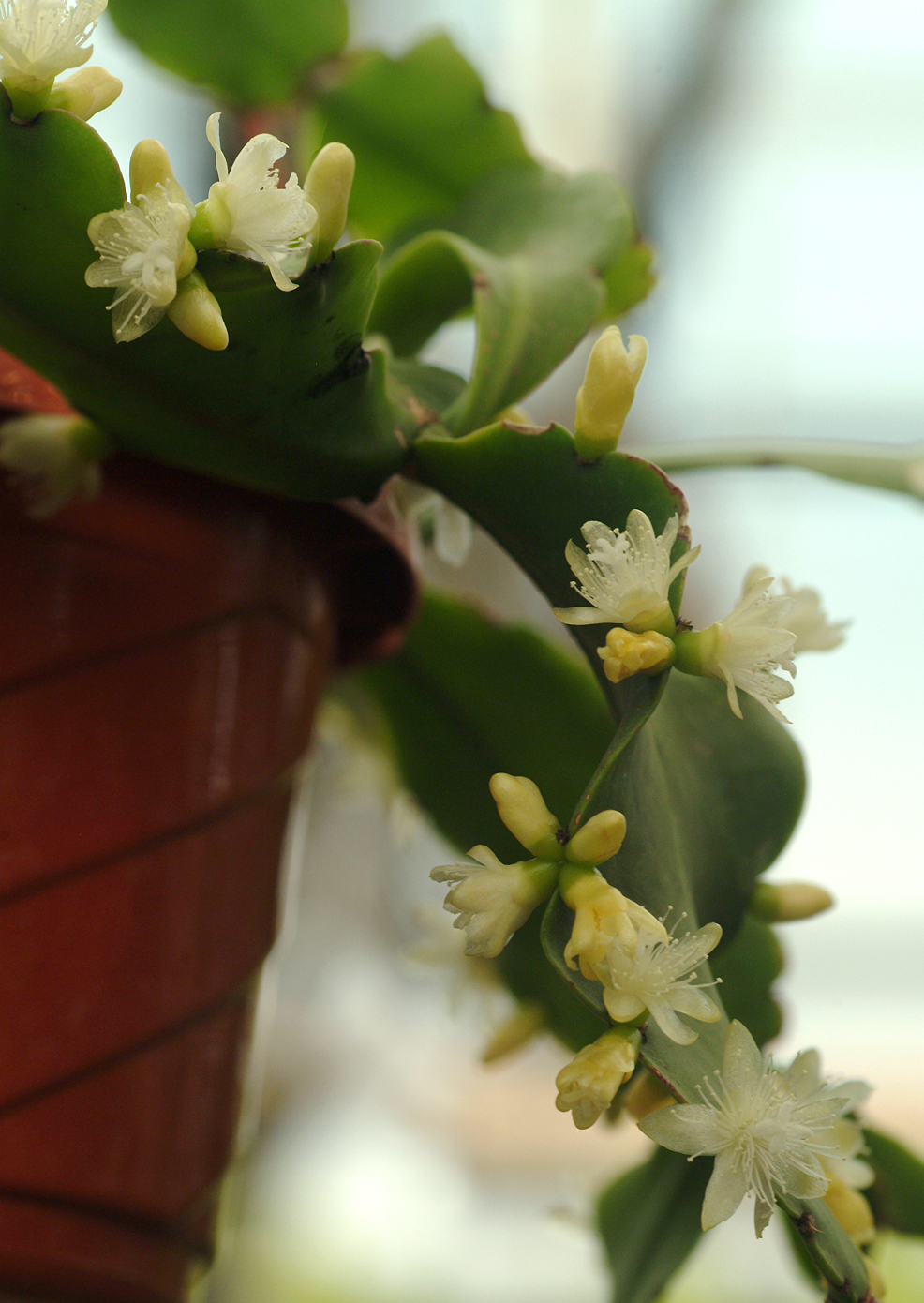

Conservation status
- Endangered (IUCN 3.1)

Scientific classification
- Kingdom: Plantae
- Clade: Tracheophytes
- Clade: Angiosperms
- Clade: Eudicots
- Order: Caryophyllales
- Family: Cactaceae
- Subfamily: Cactoideae
- Genus: Rhipsalis
- Species: R. crispata

Binomial name
- Rhipsalis crispata (Haw.) Pfeiff.

= Rhipsalis crispata =

Species of cactus

Rhipsalis crispata is a species of terrestrial plant in the family Cactaceae.

It is endemic to Brazil. Its natural habitats are subtropical or tropical dry forest and subtropical or tropical moist lowland forest.

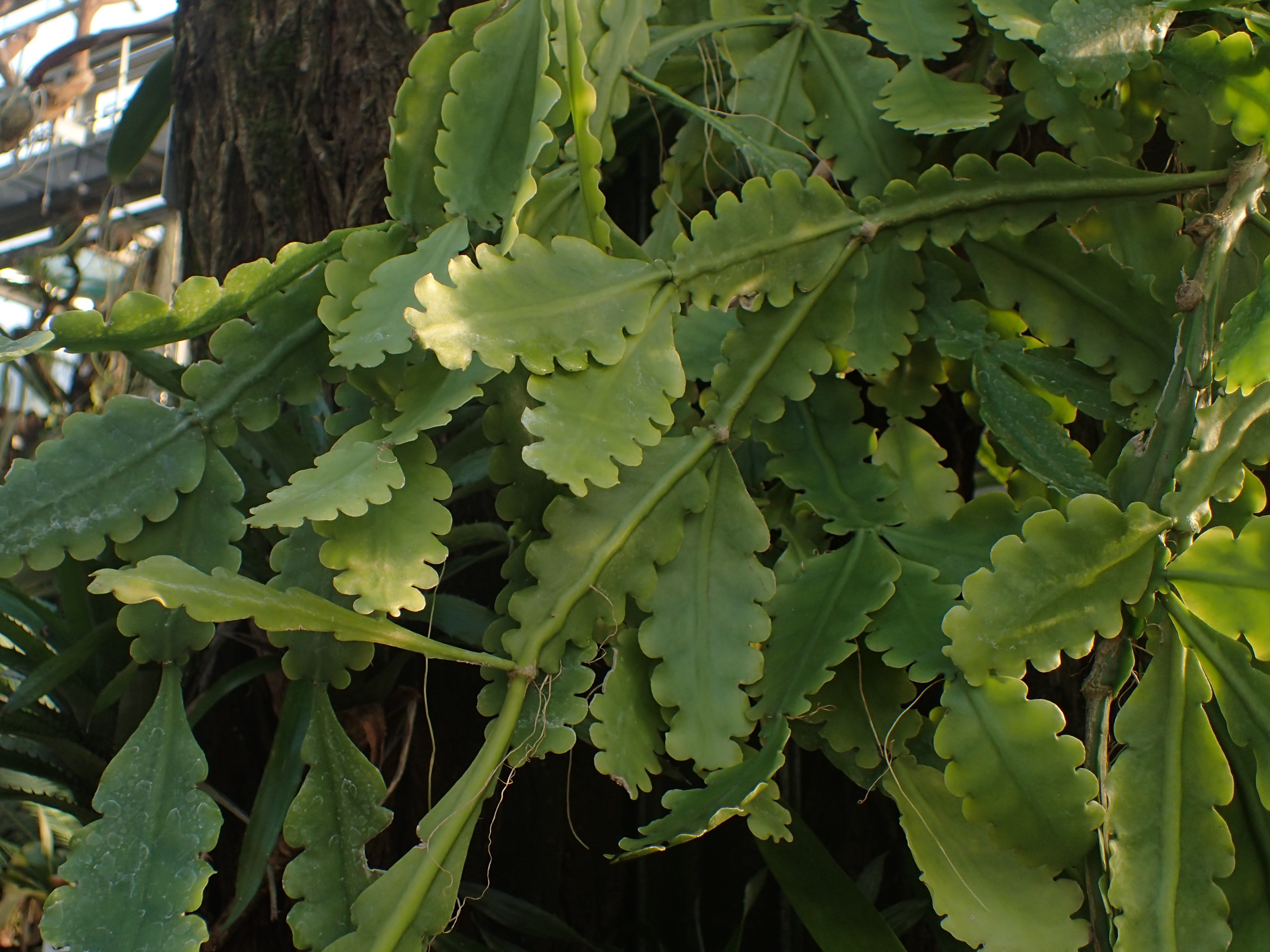
Rhipsalis crispata

== Conservation ==
Rhipsalis crispata, while being widely distributed (an area of less than 2000 km^{2}), is rarely observed. Due to widespread destruction of the habitat it occupies, it has become vulnerable on The IUCN Red List, and its population continues to decrease.
