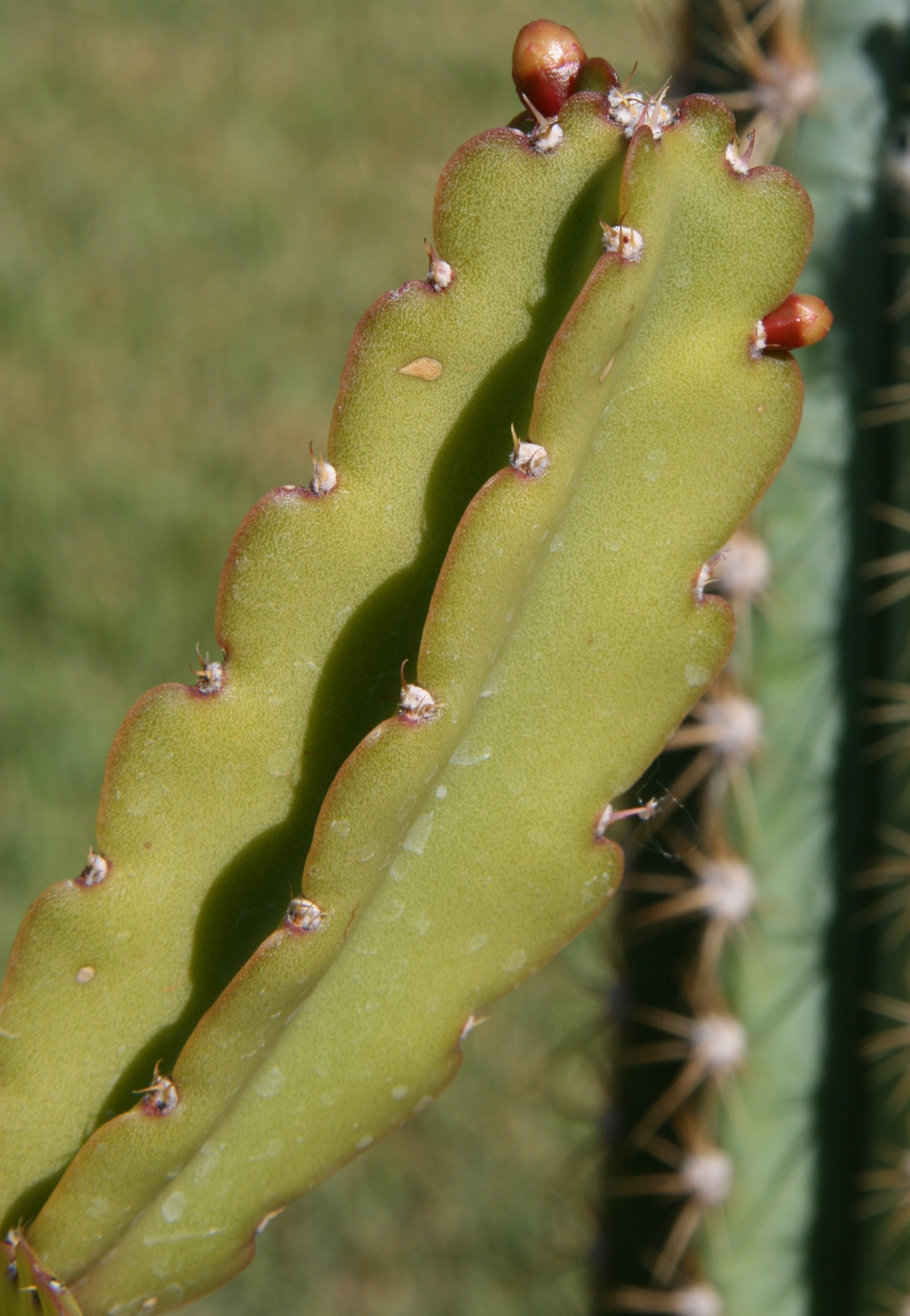
- Flowering Rhipsalis russelii

Conservation status
- Vulnerable (IUCN 3.1)

Scientific classification
- Kingdom: Plantae
- Clade: Tracheophytes
- Clade: Angiosperms
- Clade: Eudicots
- Order: Caryophyllales
- Family: Cactaceae
- Subfamily: Cactoideae
- Genus: Rhipsalis
- Species: R. russellii

Binomial name
- Rhipsalis russellii Britton & Rose

= Rhipsalis russellii =

Species of cactus

Rhipsalis russellii is a species of plant in the family Cactaceae. It is endemic to Brazil. Its natural habitats are subtropical or tropical moist lowland forests and rocky areas. It is threatened by habitat loss.
