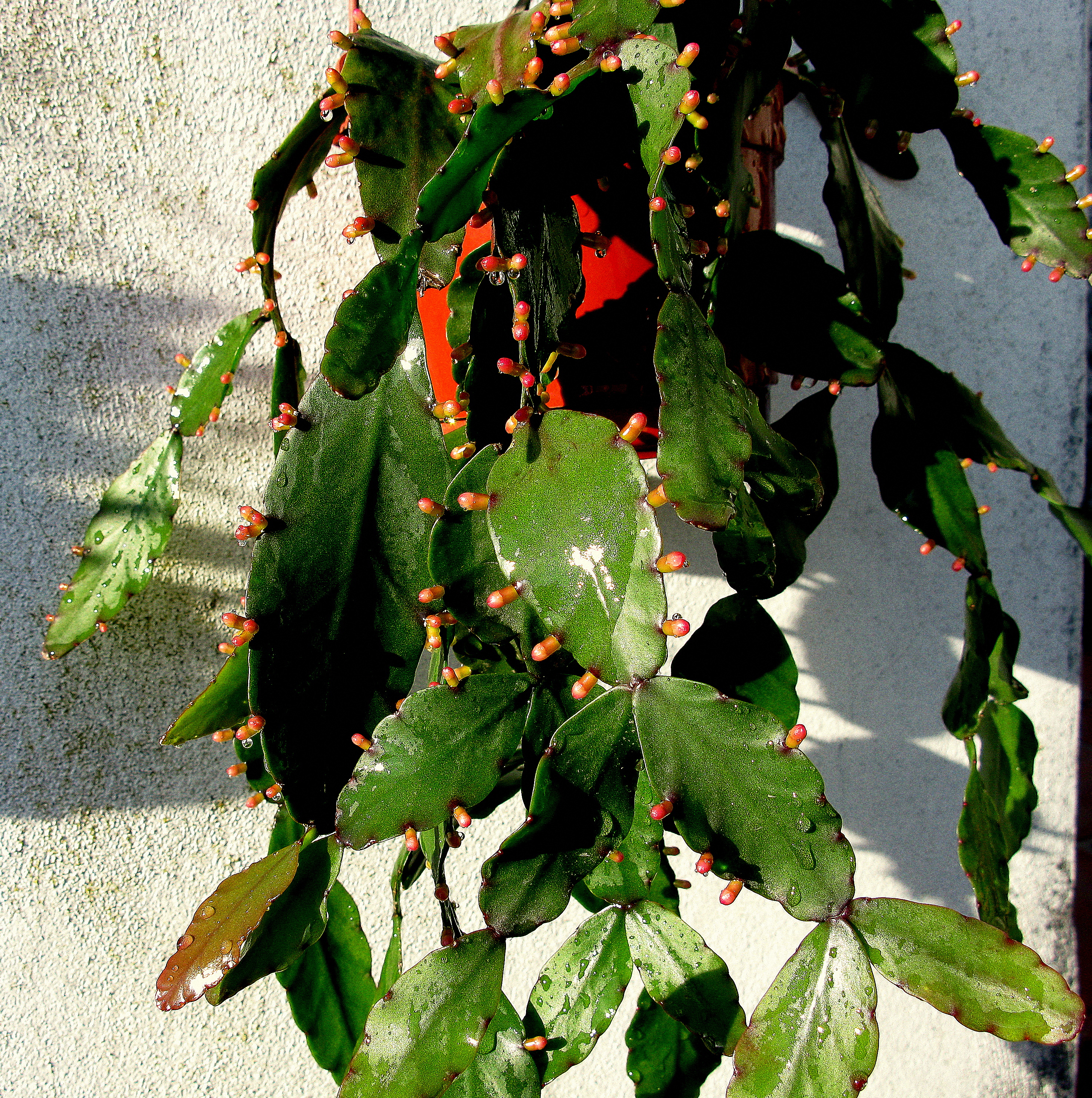

Conservation status
- Least Concern (IUCN 3.1)

Scientific classification
- Kingdom: Plantae
- Clade: Tracheophytes
- Clade: Angiosperms
- Clade: Eudicots
- Order: Caryophyllales
- Family: Cactaceae
- Subfamily: Cactoideae
- Genus: Rhipsalis
- Species: R. elliptica

Binomial name
- Rhipsalis elliptica Lindberg ex K.Schumann

= Rhipsalis elliptica =

Species of cactus

Rhipsalis elliptica is a species of plant in the family Cactaceae. It is endemic to Brazil. Its natural habitat is subtropical or tropical moist lowland forest. It is threatened by habitat loss.
