= Joseph zu Salm-Reifferscheidt-Dyck =

German botanist (1773–1861)

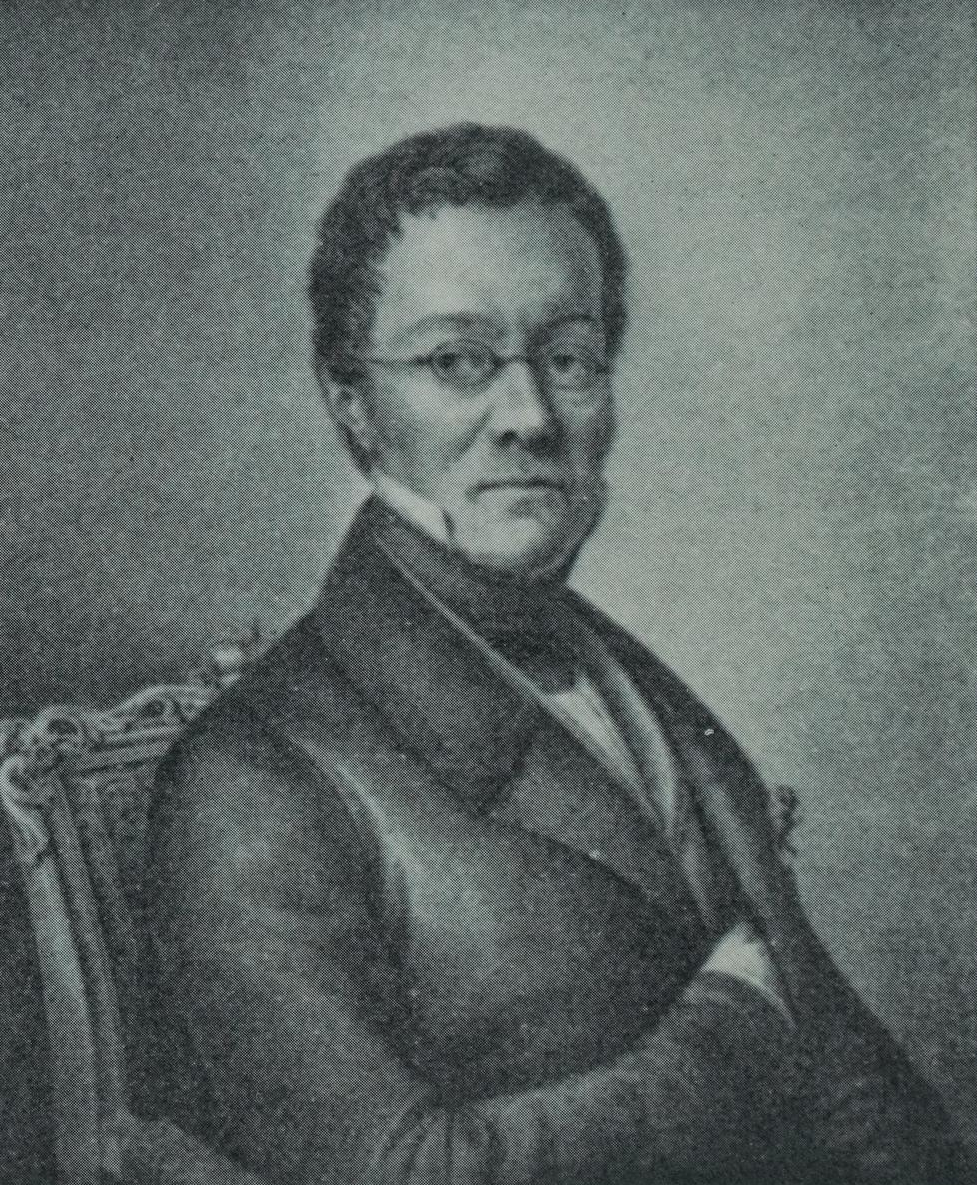
- Born: 4 September 1773; Castle Dyck, Neuss
- Died: 21 March 1861 (aged 87); Nice
- Spouse: Constance de Salm
- Scientific career
- Author abbrev. (botany): Salm-Dyck

Joseph Franz Maria Anton Hubert Ignatz Fürst und Altgraf zu Salm-Reifferscheidt-Dyck (4 September 1773 at Castle Dyck near Neuss – 21 March 1861 in Nice) was a German aristocrat, amateur botanist and owner of Castle Dyck.

== Early life ==
Joseph Franz was a member of the Salm-Reifferscheid-Dyck line of the House of Salm, an important aristocratic family that had ruled a small territory until the mediatisation of small German states in the early 19th century. He was the eldest surviving son of Count Franz Johann Wilhelm von Salm-Reifferscheidt-Dyck (1714–1775) and his wife, Countess Auguste von Waldburg zu Zeil und Wurzach (1743–1776).

== Biography ==
After his training at the Jesuit College in Cologne, he traveled to Vienna, Brussels and Paris for private academic studies. His county's sovereignty was lost after revolutionary France annexed the Rhineland. In repeated trips to Paris, he made sure that his family's possessions were preserved. He regularly used his stays in Paris for scientific purposes. The territory he reigned was mediatised to the Kingdom of Prussia in 1813. As a compensation, Count Joseph zu Salm-Reifferscheidt-Dyck was raised to the hereditary rank of Prince in Prussia three years later, in 1816.

== Personal life ==
In 1792, he married for the first time. The bride was Countess Maria Theresia von Hatzfeldt-Wildenburg (1776–1838), daughter of Count Klemens von Hatzfeldt-Wildenburg (1743–1794) and his wife, Countess Hortensia von Zierotin-Lilgenau (1750–1813). The marriage ended in divorce in 1801 with no surviving children.

In 1803, he married his second wife, Constance-Marie de Théis, daughter of Alexandre Marie de Théis (1738–1796), a Judge and Grand forester of the County of Nantes. Constance was a French poet and miscellaneous writer, who also divorced her first husband, Jean Baptiste Pipelet de Leury (1759–1823). They did not have children.

== Works ==
- Monographia generum Aloes et Mesembryanthemi:
  - Fasciculus 1 . Arnz, Düsseldorpii [1836] Digital edition by the University and State Library Düsseldorf
  - Fasciculus 2 . Arnz, Düsseldorpii [1836] Digital edition by the University and State Library Düsseldorf
  - Fasciculus 3 . Arnz, Düsseldorpii [1836] Digital edition by the University and State Library Düsseldorf
  - Fasciculus 4 . Arnz, Düsseldorpii [1836] Digital edition by the University and State Library Düsseldorf
