= List of edible cacti =

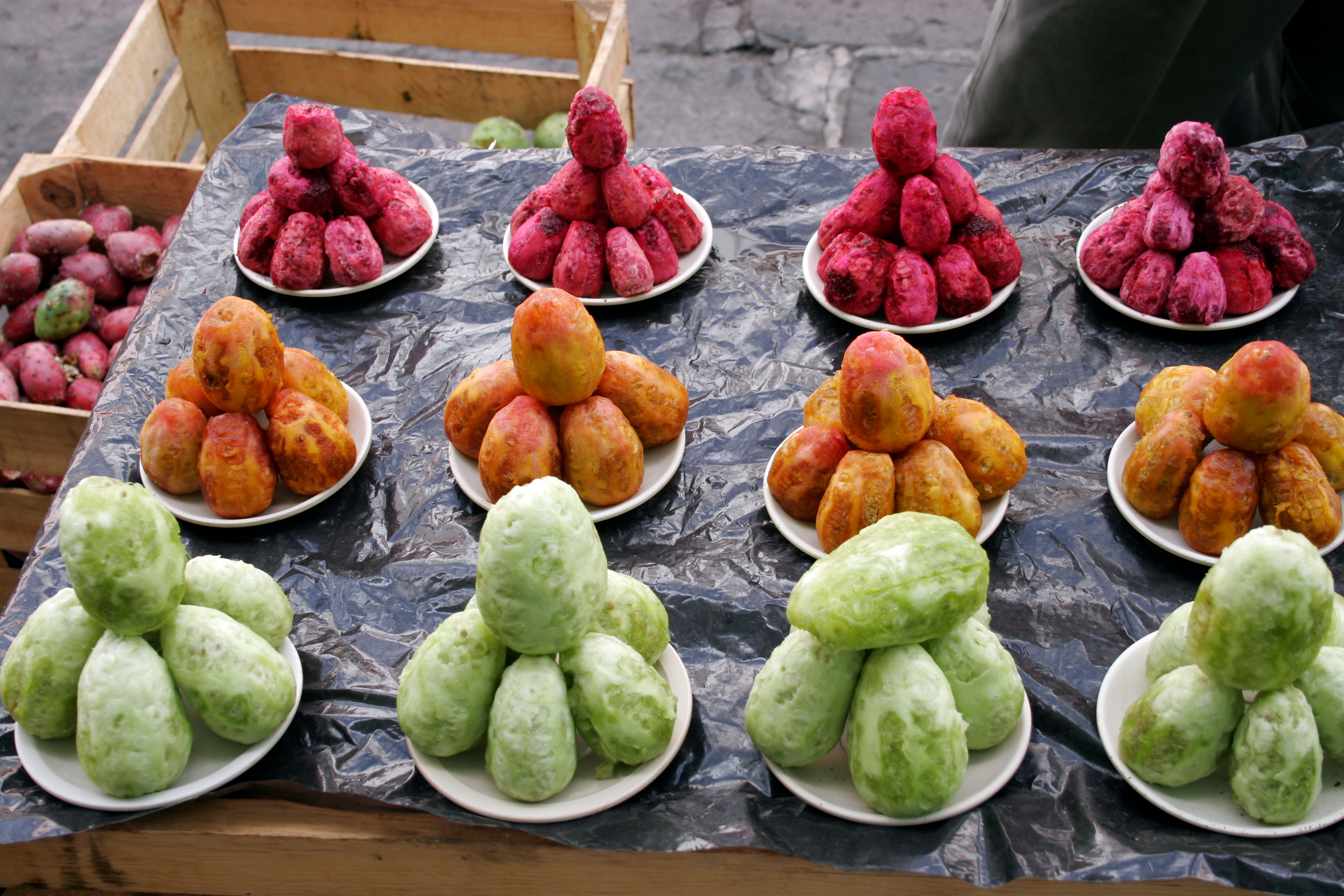
Prickly pear fruit for sale at a market, Zacatecas, Mexico

This is a list of edible plants in the family Cactaceae.

- Acanthocereus tetragonus - sword pear
- Browningia candelaris
- Carnegiea gigantea - saguaro
- Cereus repandus - hedge cactus
- Cochemiea
  - C. grahamii
  - C. macdougalii
  - C. mainiae
  - C. thornberi
- Corryocactus
  - C. brevistylis
  - C. erectus
  - C. pulquiensis
- Coryphantha - beehive cacti
  - C. recurvata
  - C. robbinsorum
- Cylindropuntia - cholla cacti
  - Cylindropuntia acanthocarpa - Buckhorn cholla (buds are traditionally eaten in spring)
  - Cylindropuntia leptocaulis - Christmas cholla
- Disocactus anguliger - zig zag cactus (grows edible fruit with a taste similar to kiwifruit)
- Echinocereus - strawberry cacti or hedgehog cacti
  - E. bonkerae - short-spined strawberry cactus
  - E. boyce-thompsonii
  - E. brandegeei
  - E. cinerascens
  - E. dasyacanthus - spiny hedgehog cactus
  - E. engelmannii - strawberry hedgehog cactus
  - E. enneacanthus
  - E. fasciculatus - pinkflower hedgehog cactus
  - E. fendleri - Fendler's hedgehog cactus
  - E. ledingii
  - E. nicholii
  - E. stramineus - pitaya
- Echinopsis
  - E. schickendantzii
- Epiphyllum - orchid cacti
- Epithelantha (the fruit of all species said to be edible)
- Eulychnia
  - E. acida
- Ferocactus
  - F. hamatacanthus - Turk's head
  - F. histrix - borrachito
  - F. latispinus - pocha
- Harrisia - prickly applecacti
  - H. aboriginum - west-coast prickly apple
  - H. adscendens
  - H. balansae
  - H. eriophora
  - H. fragrans - fragrant prickly apple
  - H. martinii - Martin applecactus
  - H. pomanensis
  - H. simpsonii - Simpson's applecactus
- Leucostele
  - L. atacamensis - cardón
  - L. nigripilis - sea-urchin cactus
- Lophocereus schottii - senita cactus
- Mammillaria - nipple cacti or birthday cake cacti
  - M. applanata
  - M. lasiacantha - golf-ball pincushion cactus
  - M. meiacantha
  - M. microcarpa
  - M. oliviae
  - Other species
- Maihuenia - maihuén
- Myrtillocactus geometrizans - garambulos (taste like less-acidic cranberries)
- Neowerdermannia vorwerkii - achakana

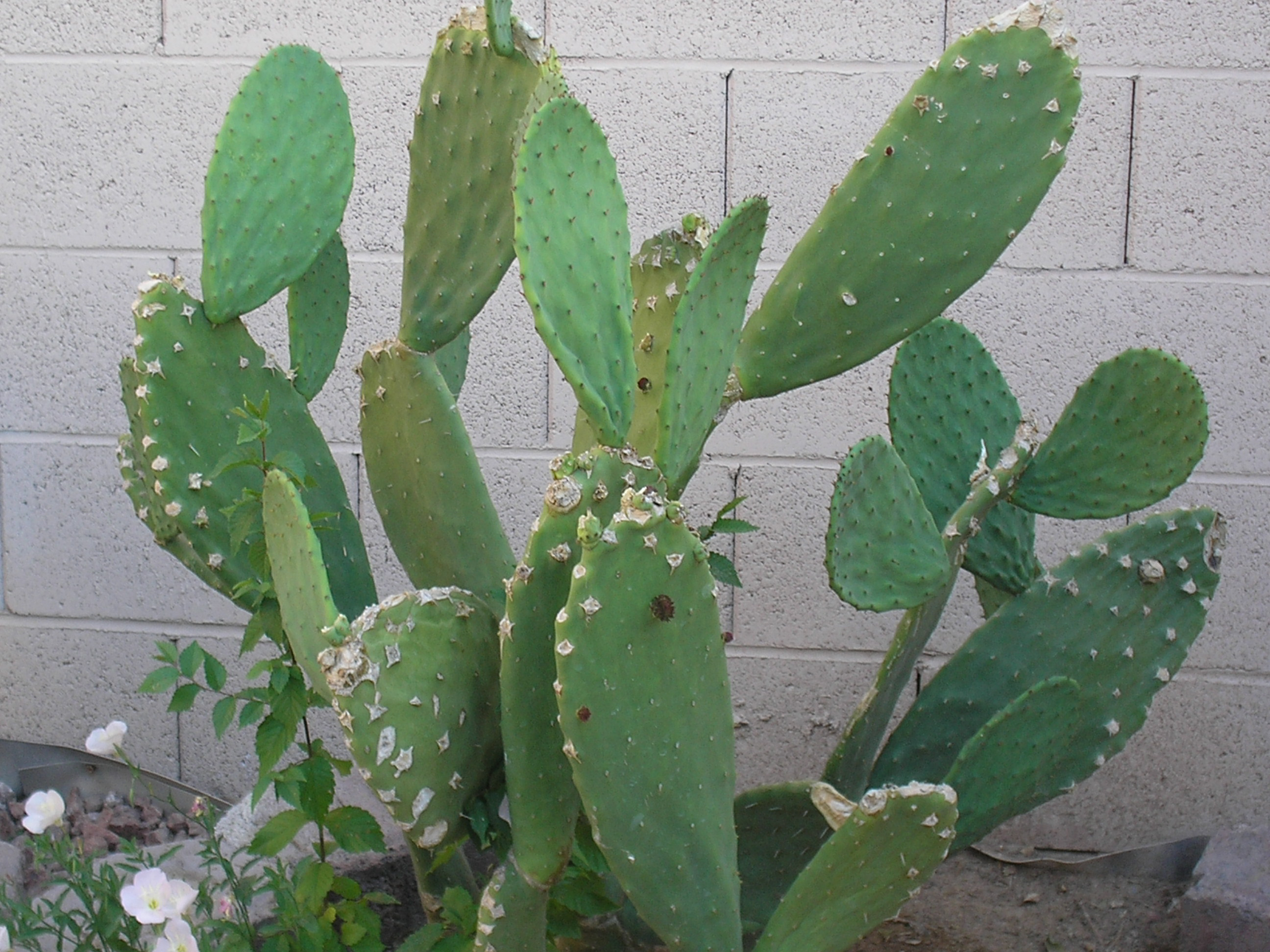
Cultivated prickly pear grown for food

- Opuntia - pricklypear cacti
  - O. basilaris - beavertail pricklypair
  - O. engelmannii - desert pricklypear
  - O. ficus-indica - Indian fig opuntia
  - O. fragilis - little pricklypear
  - O. matudae - xoconostle
- Pachycereus
  - P. pringlei - cardón
  - P. weberi - candelabro
- Peniocereus
  - P. greggii - Arizona Queen of the Night
  - P. johnstonii
  - P. serpentinus
- Pereskia
  - P. aculeata - Barbados gooseberry
  - P. guamacho
- Selenicereus - moonlight cacti (produce fruits known as pitahaya or dragonfruit)
  - S. costaricensis - red-fleshed pitahaya
  - S. megalanthus - yellow pitahaya
  - S. undatus - white-fleshed pitahaya
- Stenocereus (produce fruits known as pitaya)
  - S. fricii - pitayo de aguas
  - S. griseus - pitayo de Mayo
  - S. gummosus - pitaya agria
  - S. montanus - pitaya colorada
  - S. pruinosus - pitayo de Octubre
  - S. queretaroensis - pitaya de queretaro
  - S. standleyi - pitaya marismena
  - S. stellatus - xoconostle
  - S. thurberi - organ pipe cactus, pitayo dulce
  - S. treleasi - tunillo
