= P. greggii =

P. greggii may refer to:

- Peniocereus greggii
- Pinus greggii

== See also ==
- Greggii
