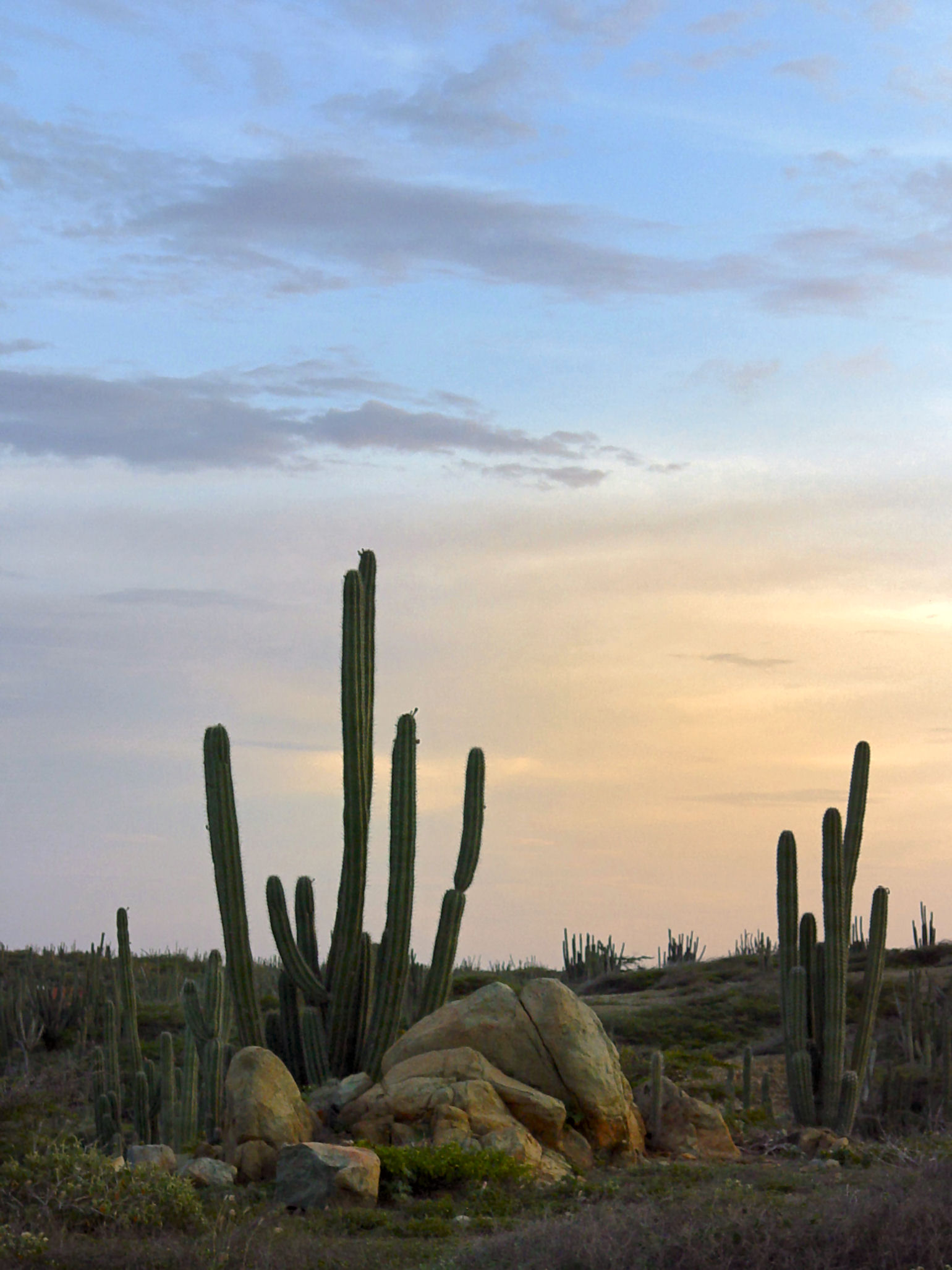

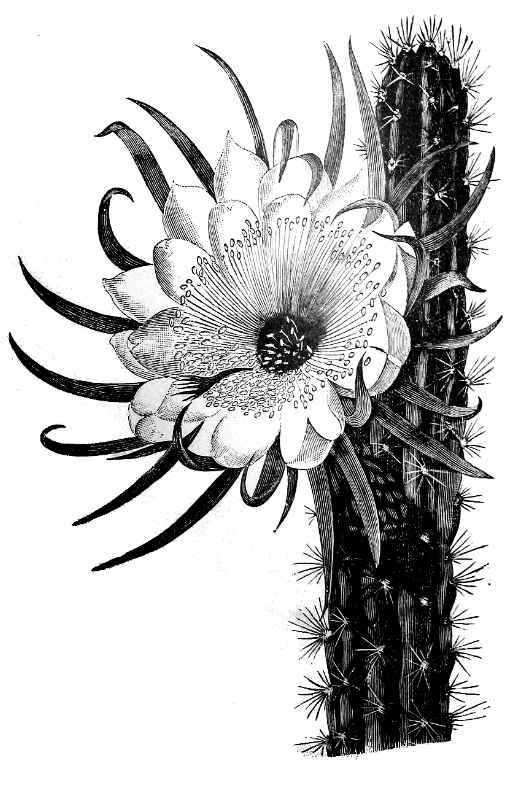
- Drawing of flowering stem

Scientific classification
- Kingdom: Plantae
- Clade: Tracheophytes
- Clade: Angiosperms
- Clade: Eudicots
- Order: Caryophyllales
- Family: Cactaceae
- Subfamily: Cactoideae
- Genus: Cereus
- Species: C. repandus

Binomial name
- Cereus repandus Mill.

Synonyms
- Cereus peruvianus

= Cereus repandus =

Peruvian apple cactus

Species of cactus

Cereus repandus (syn. Cereus peruvianus), the Peruvian apple cactus, is a large, erect, spiny columnar cactus found in South America. It is also known as giant club cactus, hedge cactus, cadushi (in Papiamento and Wayuunaiki), and kayush.

Cereus repandus is grown mostly as an ornamental plant, but has some local culinary importance. The Wayuu from the La Guajira Peninsula of Colombia and Venezuela also use the inner cane-like wood of the plant in wattle and daub construction.

== Description ==
With an often tree-like appearance, its cylindrical gray-green to blue stems can reach 10 metres (33 feet) in height and 10–20 cm in diameter as a self-supporting plant. There are nine to ten rounded ribs that are up to 1 centimeter high. The small areoles on it are far apart. The gray, needle-like thorns are very variable. They are often numerous, but can also be missing entirely. The longest thorns are up to 5 centimeters long.

The large, cream-colored, nocturnal flowers remain open for only one night and are of vital importance to pollinating bats. The fruits, known locally as pitaya, olala (only in some parts of Bolivia) or Peruvian apple, are thornless and vary in skin colour from violet-red to yellow. The edible flesh is white and contains small, edible, crunchy seeds. The flesh sweetens as the fruit opens out fully. As the cactus grows in arid regions and fruits in the dry seasons, the fruit is an essential source of food for birds in its native range. Cereus repandus is often confused with others species in the genus cereus such as Cereus forbesii, Cereus jamacaru, Cereus hildmannianus, and Cereus hexagonus.

== Images ==
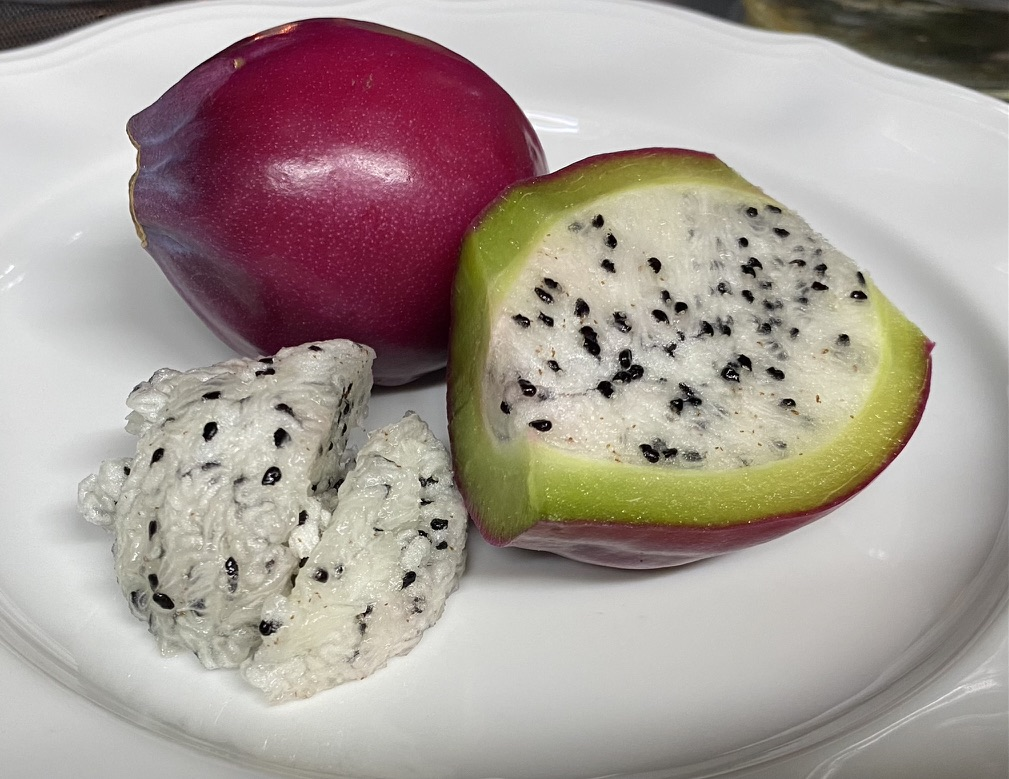
Fruit

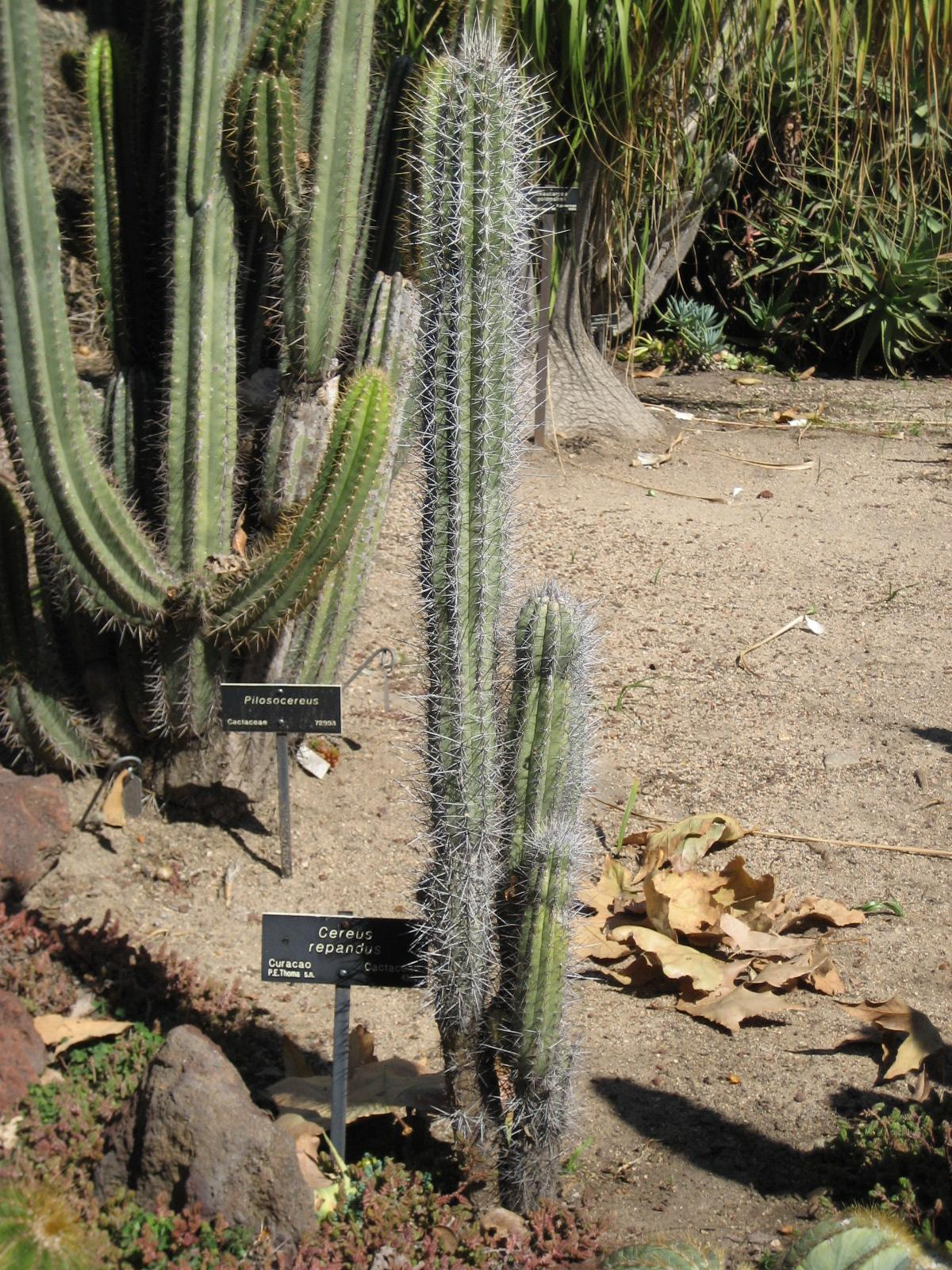
Cereus repandus at Huntington Botanical Gardens

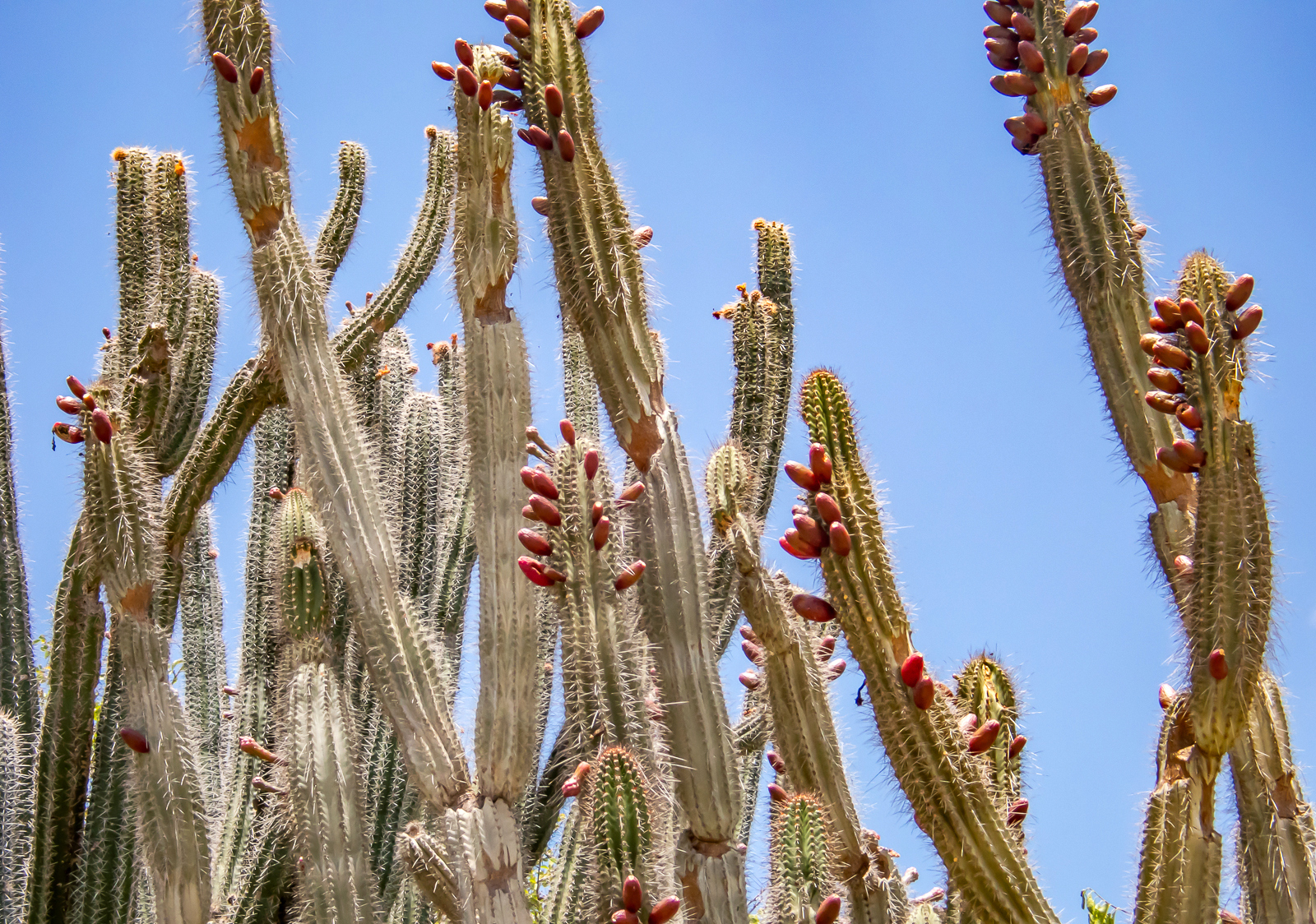
Blooming stems

== See also ==
- List of edible cacti
