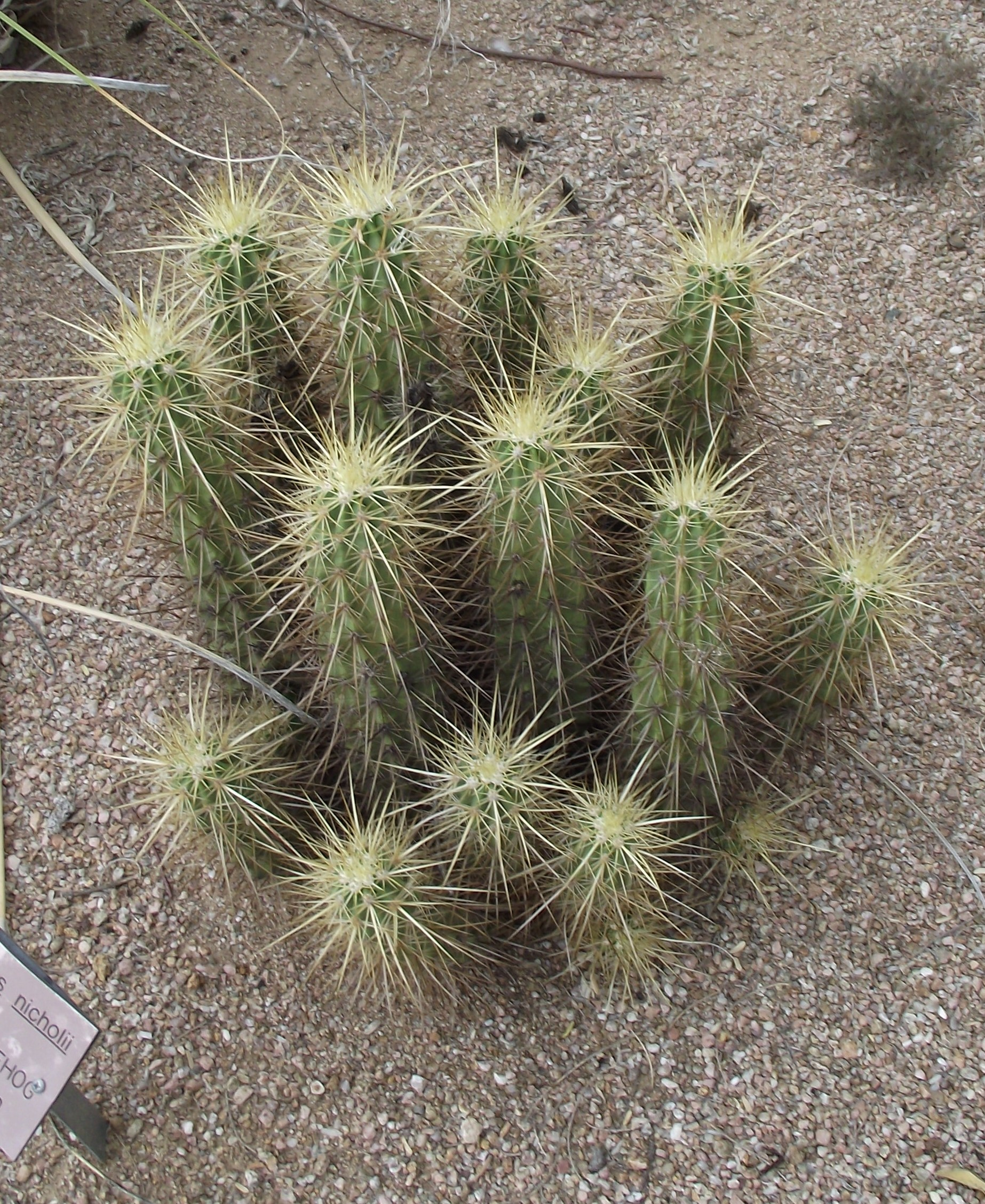

Conservation status
- Least Concern (IUCN 3.1)

Scientific classification
- Kingdom: Plantae
- Clade: Tracheophytes
- Clade: Angiosperms
- Clade: Eudicots
- Order: Caryophyllales
- Family: Cactaceae
- Subfamily: Cactoideae
- Genus: Echinocereus
- Species: E. nicholii

Binomial name
- Echinocereus nicholii (L.D.Benson) B.D.Parfitt, 1987

Synonyms
- Echinocereus engelmannii var. nicholii L.D.Benson 1944

= Echinocereus nicholii =

Species of cactus

Echinocereus nicholii is a species of cactus native to Arizona in the United States, and Sonora in Mexico.

== Description ==
Echinocereus nicholii forms large, loose groups of up to 30 upright, cylindrical shoots from the base. These shoots are 30 to 60 cm (12 to 24 in) long and 5 to 7 cm (2.0 to 2.8 in) in diameter, with 10 to 13 non-tuberculated ribs. The plant features strikingly long central spines that are glassy white or golden yellow. There are typically 2 to 6 (rarely up to 11) straight and stiff central spines, with the lowest being 5 to 6.2 cm (2.0 to 2.4 in) long. The 8 to 12 (sometimes up to 18) marginal spines are spreading, straight, and 0.8 to 1.2 cm (0.31 to 0.47 in) long.

The funnel-shaped flowers are red to blood red, appearing on the upper half of the shoots. They are 5 to 6.2 cm (2.0 to 2.4 in) long and have a similar diameter. The initially green, egg-shaped fruits turn red and are covered with falling thorns.

== Distribution ==
Echinocereus nicholii is found in the southeastern state of Arizona, USA in the Silverbell mountains near Tucson to Organ Pipe Cactus National Monument and the state of Sonora, Mexico. It thrives in xeric scrublands on limestone and basaltic soils at elevations of 300 to 900 meters above sea level. Plants are found growing with Carnegiea gigantea, Ferocactus cylindraceus, Ferocactus emoryi, Cochemiea grahamii, Cylindropuntia acanthocarpa, Stenocereus thurberi, and sometimes Sclerocactus johnsonii subsp. erectocentrus.

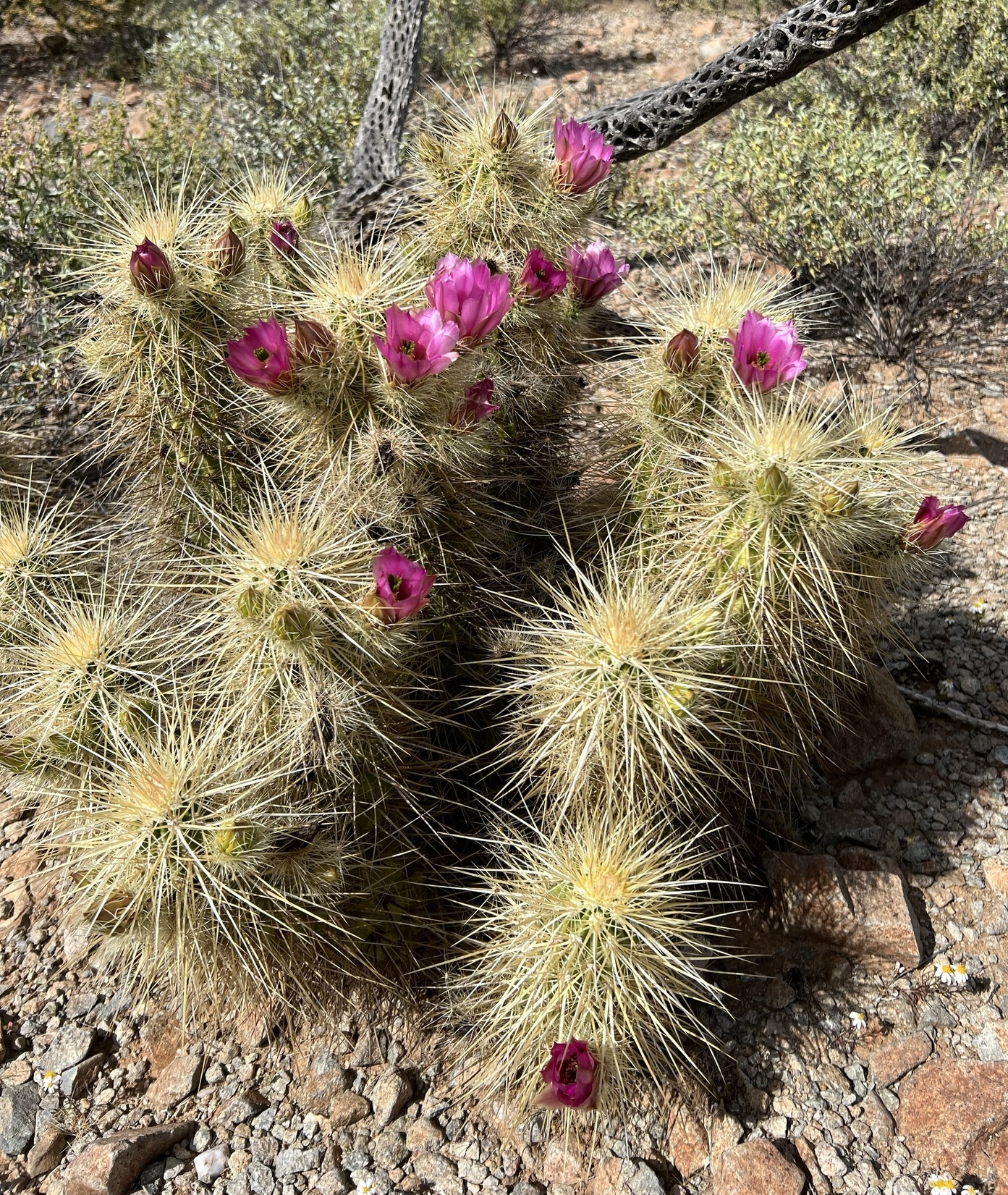
Plant growing in habitat in southern Arizona

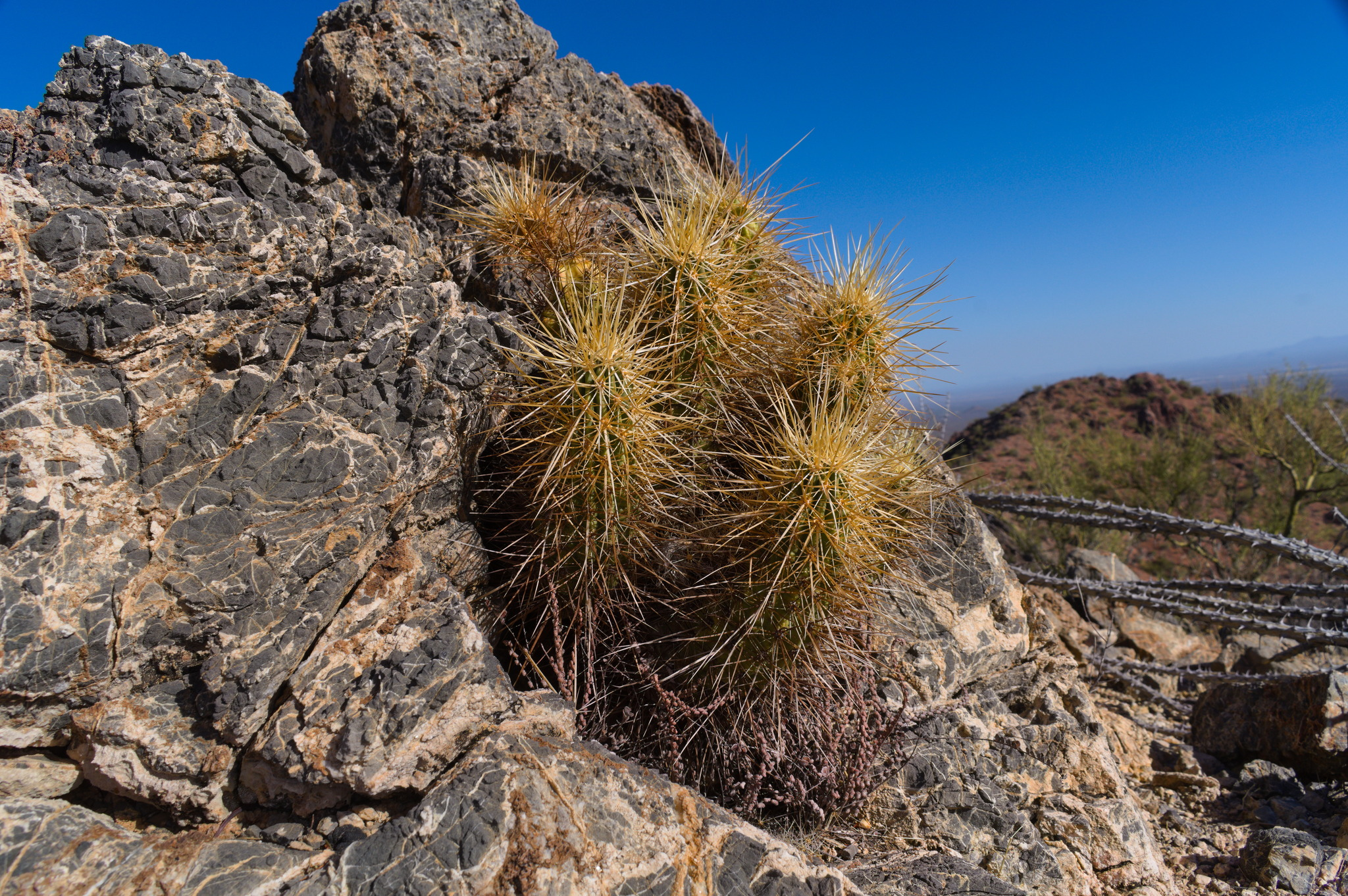
Plant growing in Avra Valley, Arizona

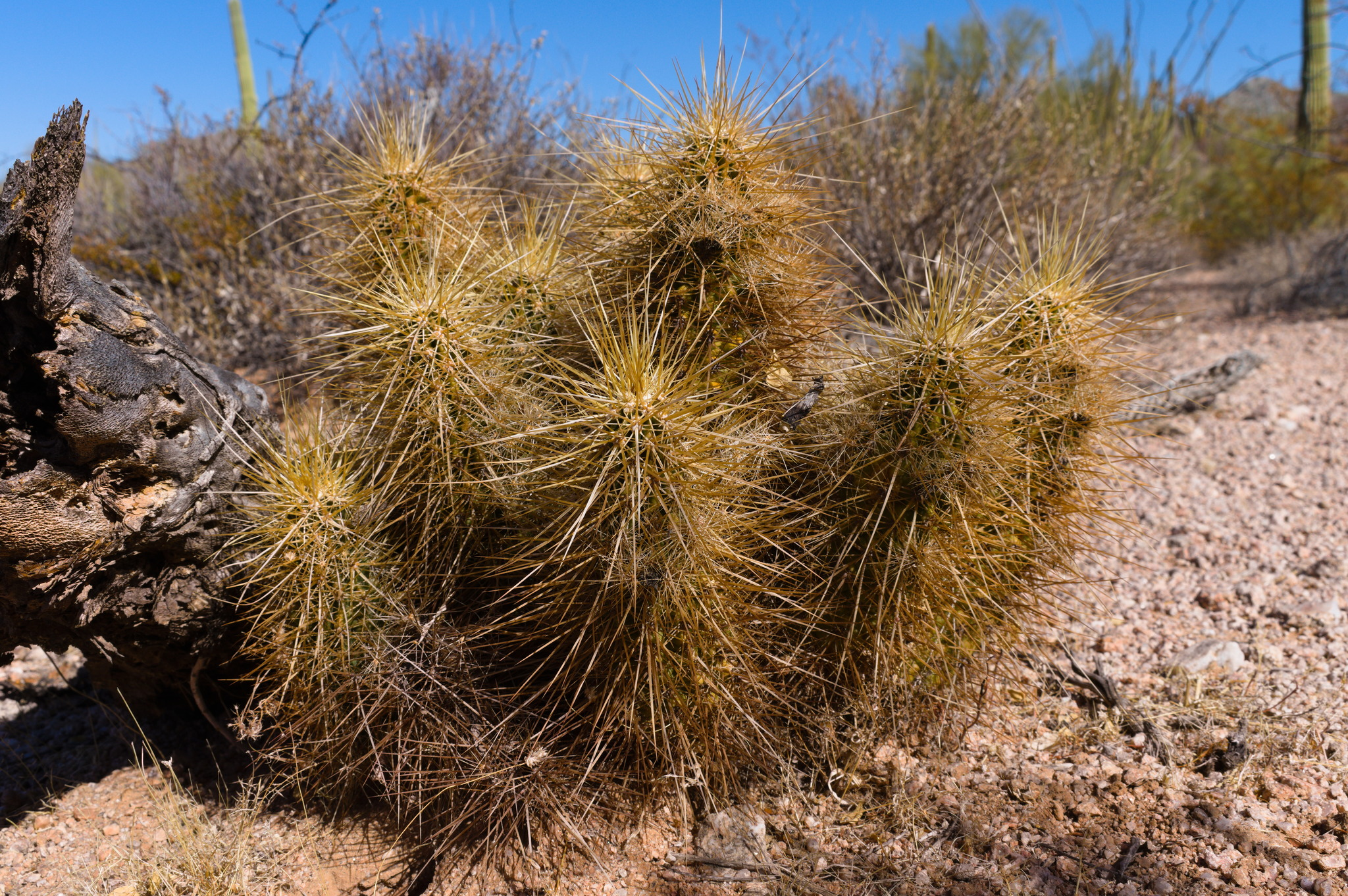
Plant growing near Lukeville, Arizona

== Taxonomy ==
Originally described as Echinocereus engelmannii var. nicholii by Lyman David Benson in 1944, the specific epithet honors American biologist Andrew Alexander Nichol. Bruce Dale Parfitt reclassified it as a distinct species in the genus Echinocereus in 1987.
