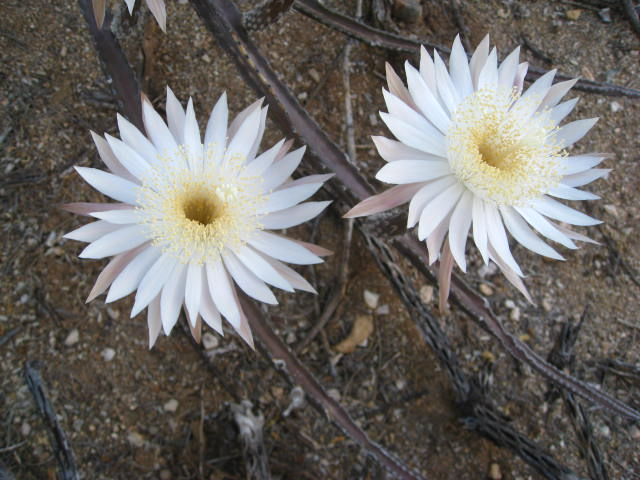

Conservation status
- Least Concern (IUCN 3.1)

Scientific classification
- Kingdom: Plantae
- Clade: Tracheophytes
- Clade: Angiosperms
- Clade: Eudicots
- Order: Caryophyllales
- Family: Cactaceae
- Subfamily: Cactoideae
- Genus: Peniocereus
- Species: P. greggii

Binomial name
- Peniocereus greggii (Engelm.) Britton & Rose

Synonyms
- Cereus greggii Engelm. 1848

= Peniocereus greggii =

Species of plant

Peniocereus greggii is a cactus species native to southern United States and Mexico.

== Description ==
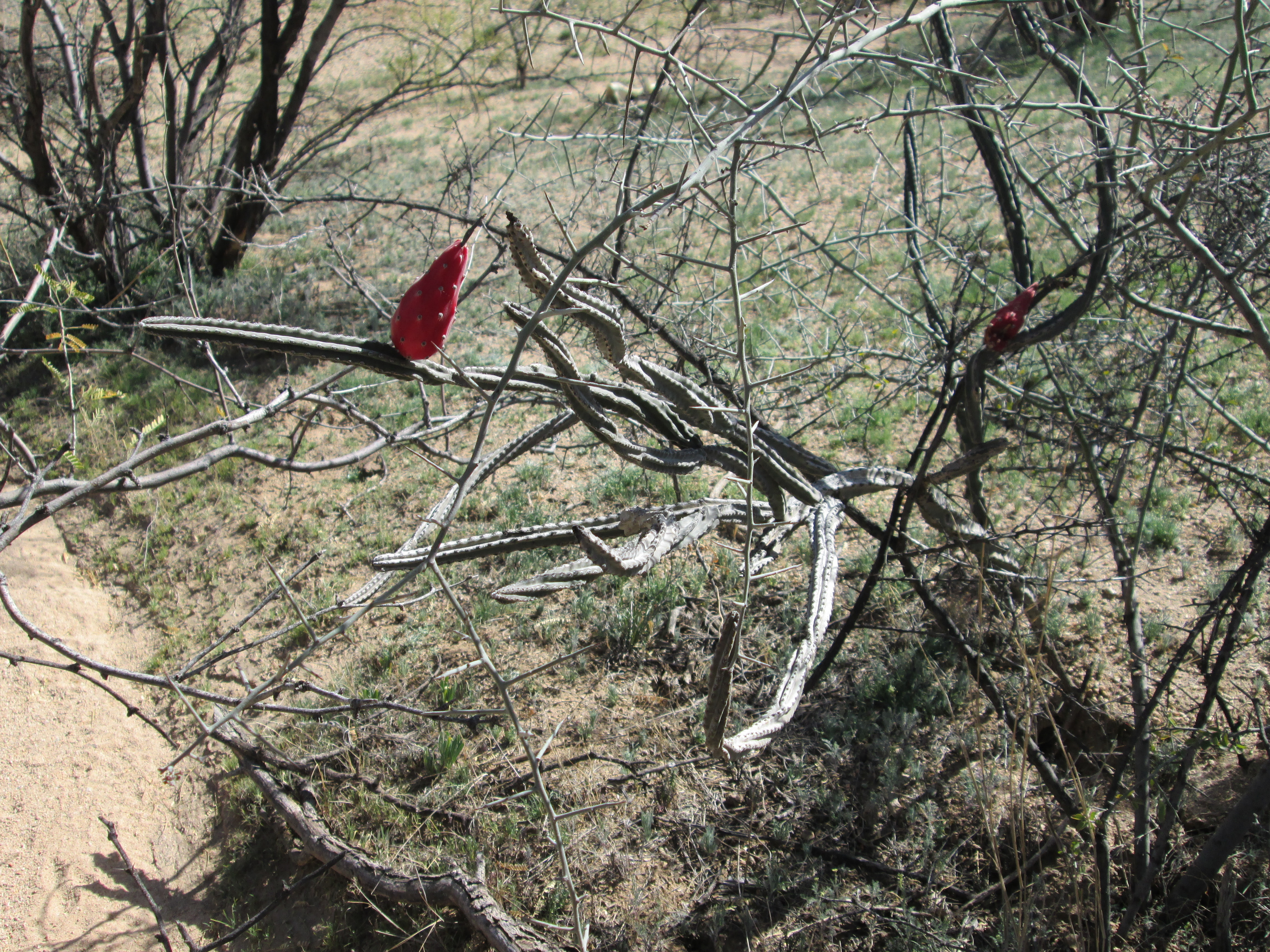
Peniocereus greggii with fruit in Sahuarita, Arizona.

This cactus grows as a shrub with branching stems. It has gray green stems about 1.2 centimeters wide and around 3 meters long with 6–9 edges or wings. The areoles have a central 2 millimeters long white spine and 9 dark radial spines that are shorter than 1 millimeter. Its flowers are white, up to 15-30 centimeters long and 5 to 7.5 centimeters in diameter with a scent redolent of vanilla. The floral tube is covered with small spines. The flowers open after sundown, closing and wasting after a few hours. By 9 am the next day they are gone. They usually bloom one night a year in June or July. In any given area, they all bloom at the same time. The fruit is oval and 5 to 7.5 centimeters long. They have a large tuber that tastes a bit like a potato. This tuber can be up to 60 cm (24 in) in length and weigh up to 57 kg (126 lb). Chromosome count is 2n = 22.

Tohono Chul in Tucson, Arizona has the largest private collection of Sonoran Desert native Night-blooming Cereus – Peniocereus greggii. Each summer this botanical garden/museum hosts "Bloom Night", the one night each summer it is predicted the greatest number of cereus flowers will be in bloom, opening from 6pm until midnight to allow guests to stroll the grounds and view the flowers.

=== Subspecies ===
There are two recognized subspecies:

Image	Scientific name	Description	Distribution
	Peniocereus greggii subsp. greggii	Eliptical areoles (4-5 × 2 mm), flowers 15-17 × 5-6 cm	Arizona, New Mexico, Texas and N. Mexico (Chihuahua, Coahuila, Durango, Sonora, Zacatecas)
	Peniocereus greggii subsp. transmontanus (Engelm.) U.Guzmán	Smaller circular areoles (1.5-2 mm), longer spines on ovary and fruit, and larger flower 22-25 × 7-8 cm.	Arizona to Mexico (Sonora).

== Distribution ==
Plants are found in Arizona, New Mexico (Dona Ana, Grant, Hidalgo, and Luna County), Texas (Big Bend Region), USA; and Chihuahua, Coahuila, Durango, Sonora, and Zacatecas (Mexico) at elevations of 300 to 1500 meters. They tend to be ubiquitous throughout the higher Sonoran Desert area around Tucson. Plants grow in silty soil with desert scrub and plants such as Larrea divaricata and Neltuma glandulosa.

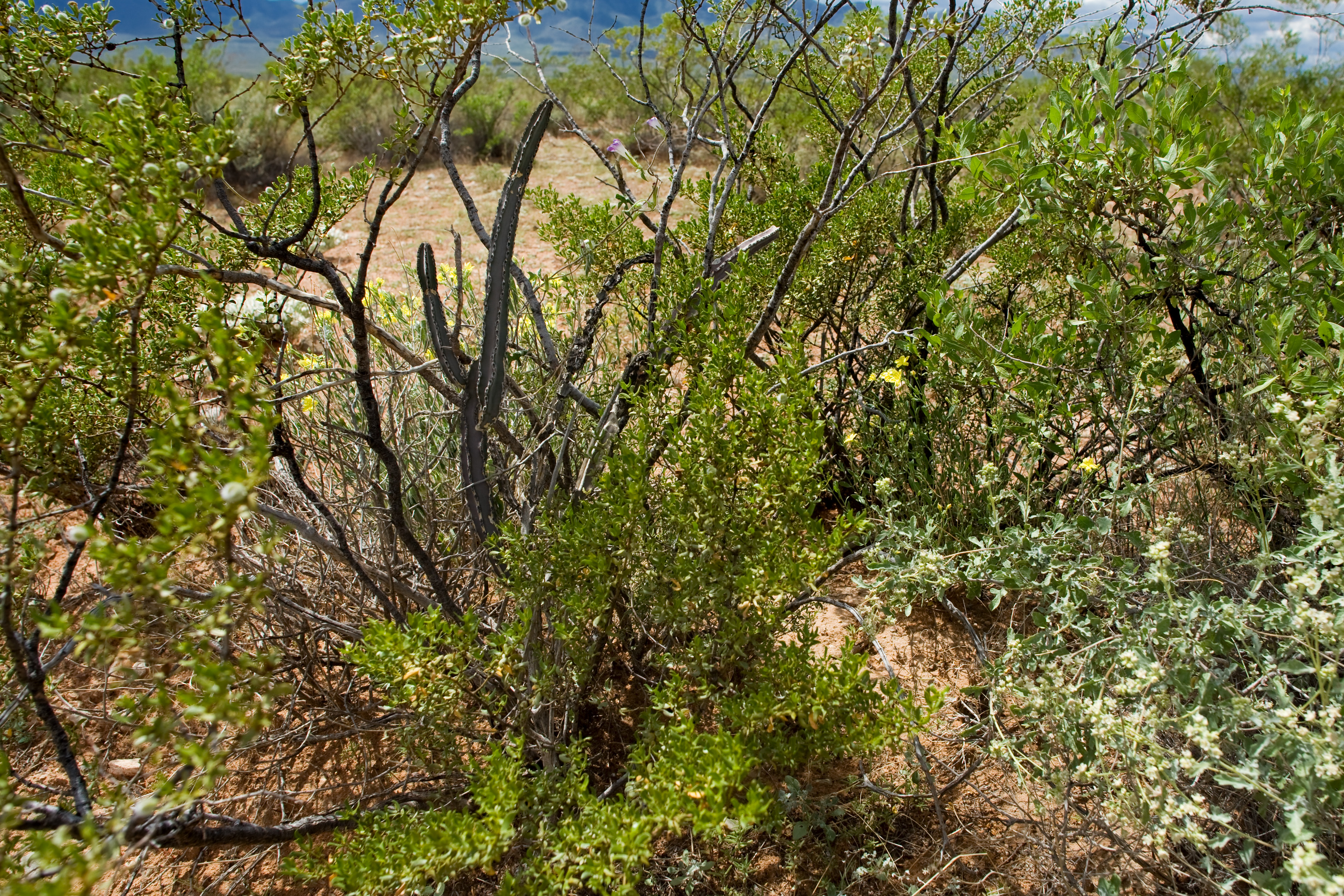
Peniocereus greggii, Hachita Valley south of Hachita, Hidalgo County, New Mexico

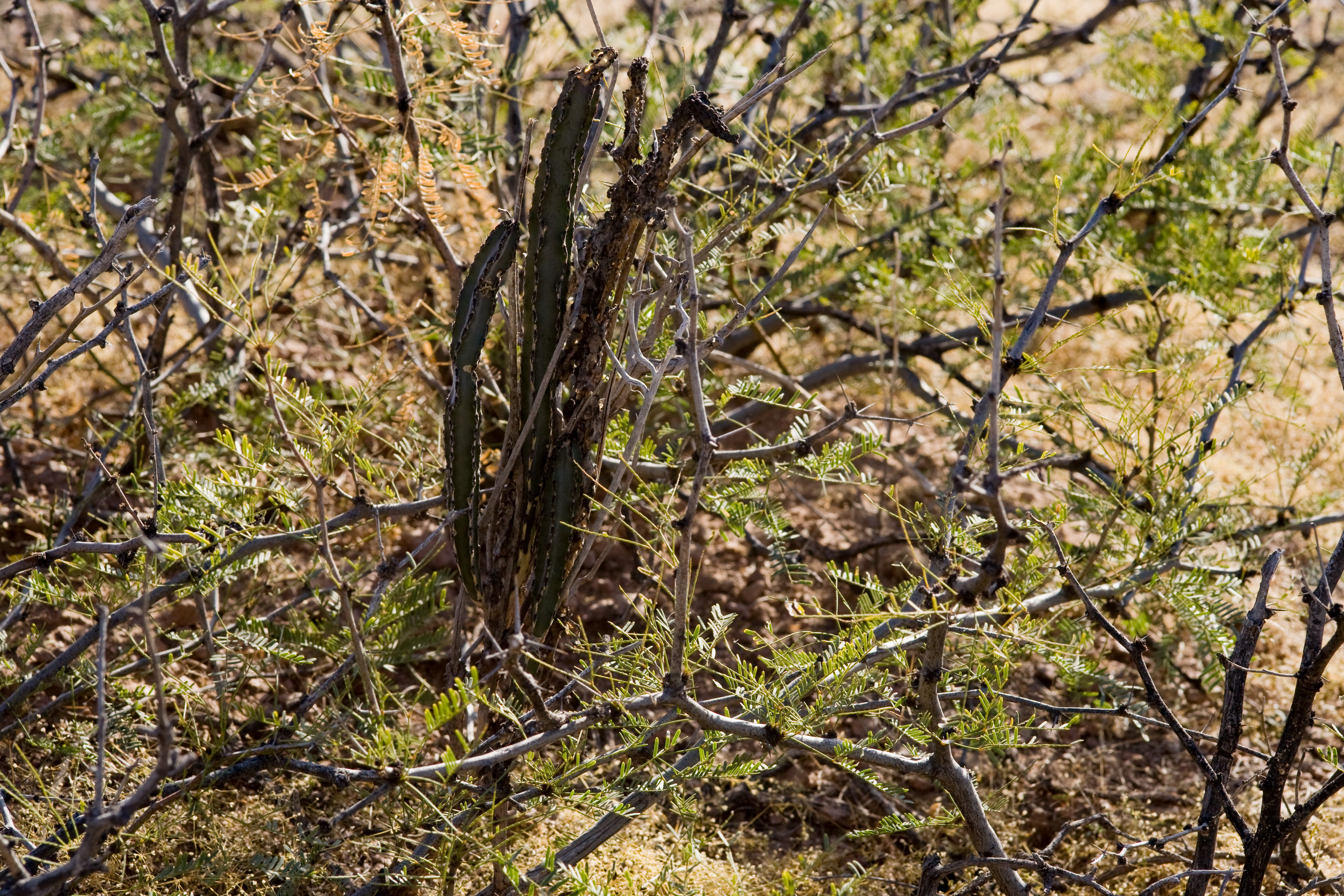
Peniocereus greggii near Rodeo on the west bajada of the Peloncillo Mountains, Hidalgo County, New Mexico

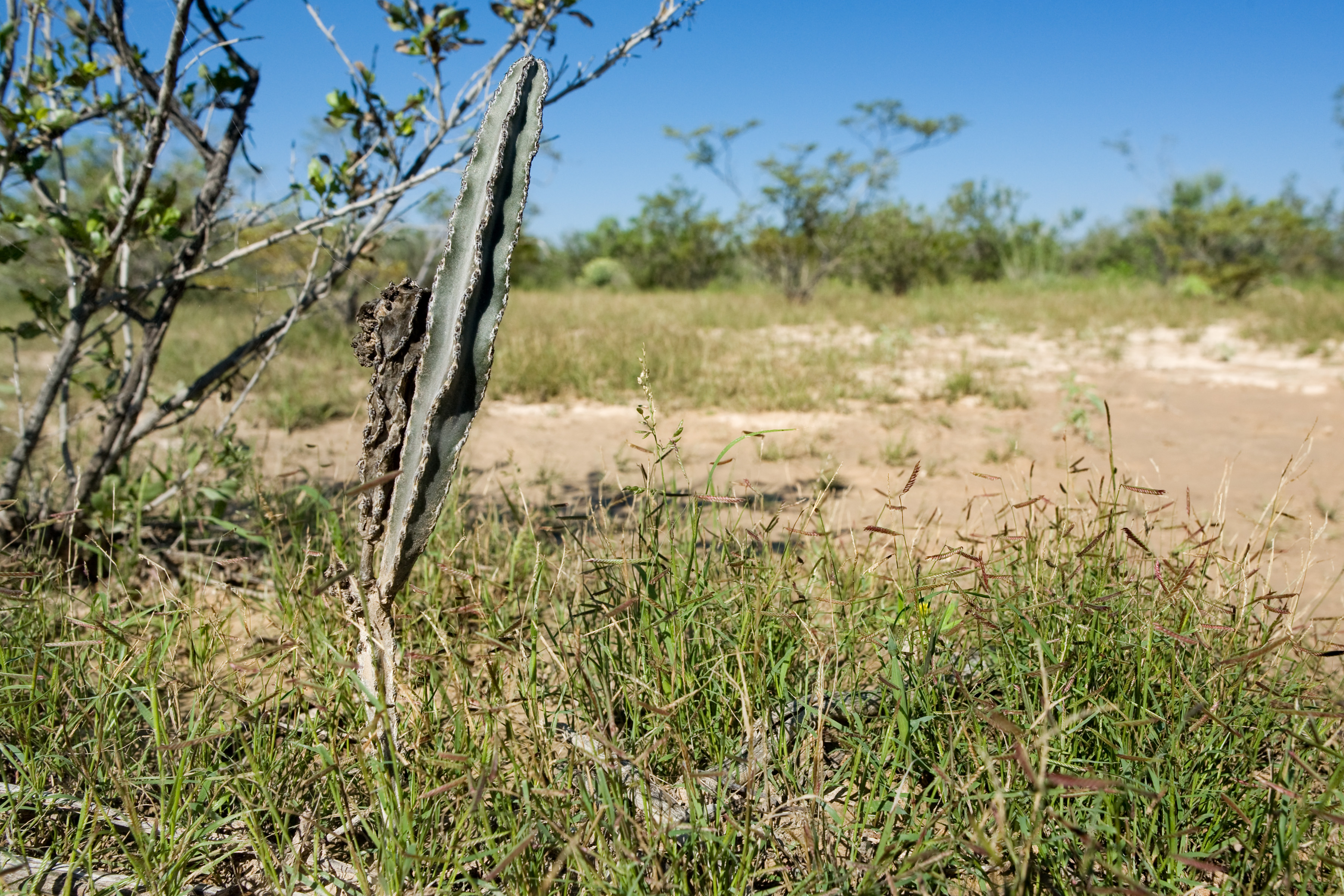
Peniocereus greggii, south of the Cedar Mountains near Wamels Draw, south side of NM Hwy. 9, Luna County, New Mexico

== Taxonomy ==
The plant was first described as Cereus greggii in 1848 by George Engelmann. Nathaniel Lord Britton and Joseph Nelson Rose placed the species in the genus Peniocereus in 1909. Common names include Arizona queen of the night, nightblooming cereus and Reina de la noche. The species name greggii honors Josiah Gregg (1806–1850), a merchant, explorer, naturalist, and author of the American Southwest and Northern Mexico.

== See also ==
- Nightblooming cereus – for others, and especially Selenicereus grandiflorus
- List of edible cacti
