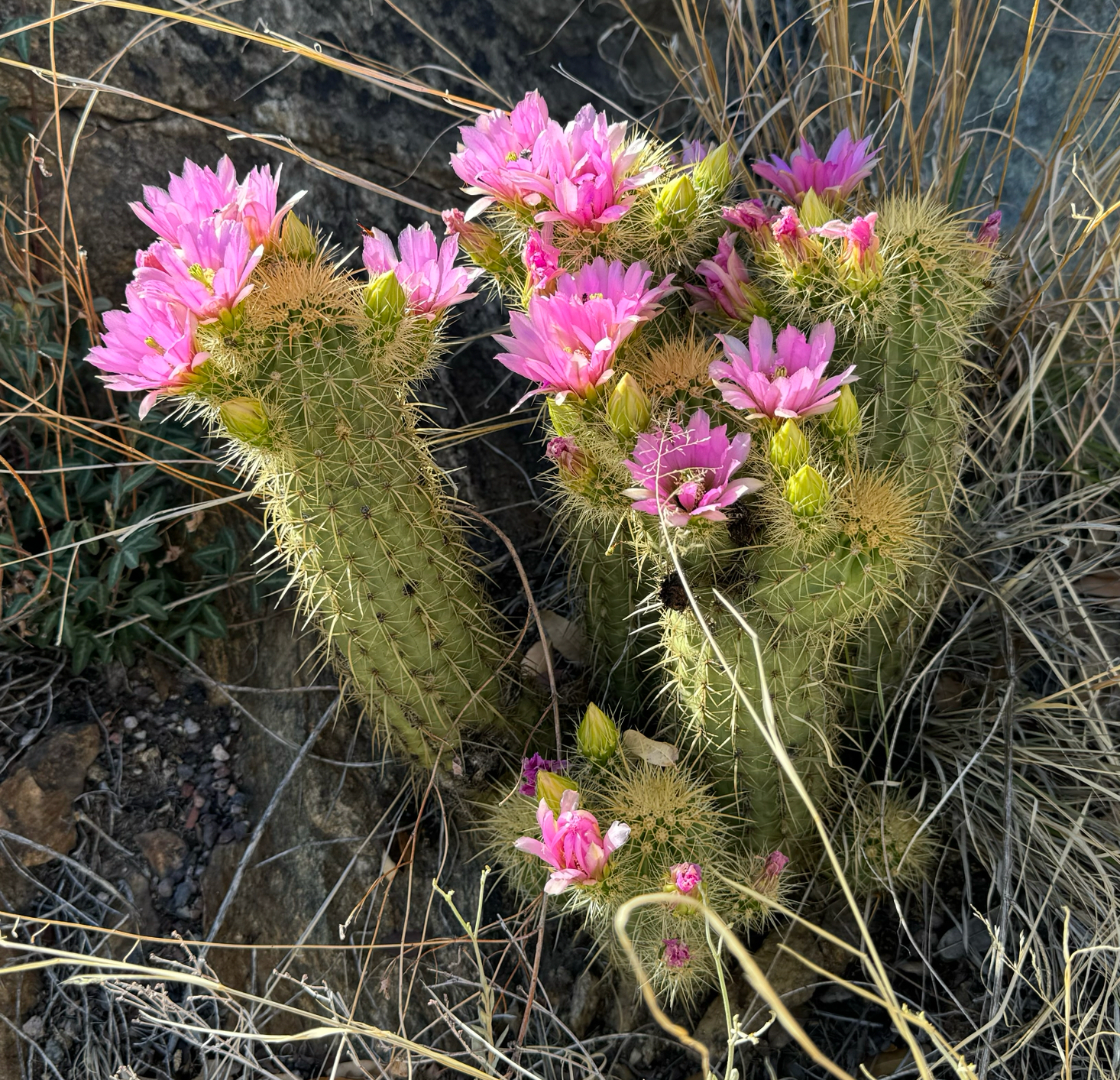

Conservation status
- Least Concern (IUCN 3.1)

Scientific classification
- Kingdom: Plantae
- Clade: Tracheophytes
- Clade: Angiosperms
- Clade: Eudicots
- Order: Caryophyllales
- Family: Cactaceae
- Subfamily: Cactoideae
- Genus: Echinocereus
- Species: E. ledingii

Binomial name
- Echinocereus ledingii Peebles, 1936

Synonyms
- Echinocereus fendleri var. ledingii (Peebles) N.P.Taylor 1985

= Echinocereus ledingii =

Species of cactus

Echinocereus ledingii is a species of cactus native to Arizona.

== Description ==
Echinocereus ledingii forms clusters of four to ten shoots. These green, egg-shaped to cylindrical shoots are 25 to 50 cm (9.8 to 19.7 in) long and 6 to 8 cm (2.4 to 3.1 in) in diameter, often hidden by thorns. The shoots feature twelve to fourteen (rarely up to sixteen) non-tuberculated ribs. They have one to four strong, round, yellowish central spines that darken to black and measure 2 to 2.5 cm (0.79 to 0.98 in) long, with the strongest spine curving downward. Additionally, there are nine to eleven spread-out, yellowish marginal spines, each 1.2 to 1.5 cm (0.47 to 0.59 in) long.

The broadly funnel-shaped flowers are magenta to pink-purple and appear near the tips or sides of the shoots. They are 5 to 6 cm (2.0 to 2.4 in) long and wide. The spherical fruits start green and turn red as they mature; they are fleshy and edible.

== Distribution ==
Echinocereus ledingii is native to southeastern Arizona in the United States growing in chaparral and oak woodlands at elevations of 1,200 to 2,000 m (3,900 to 6,600 ft).

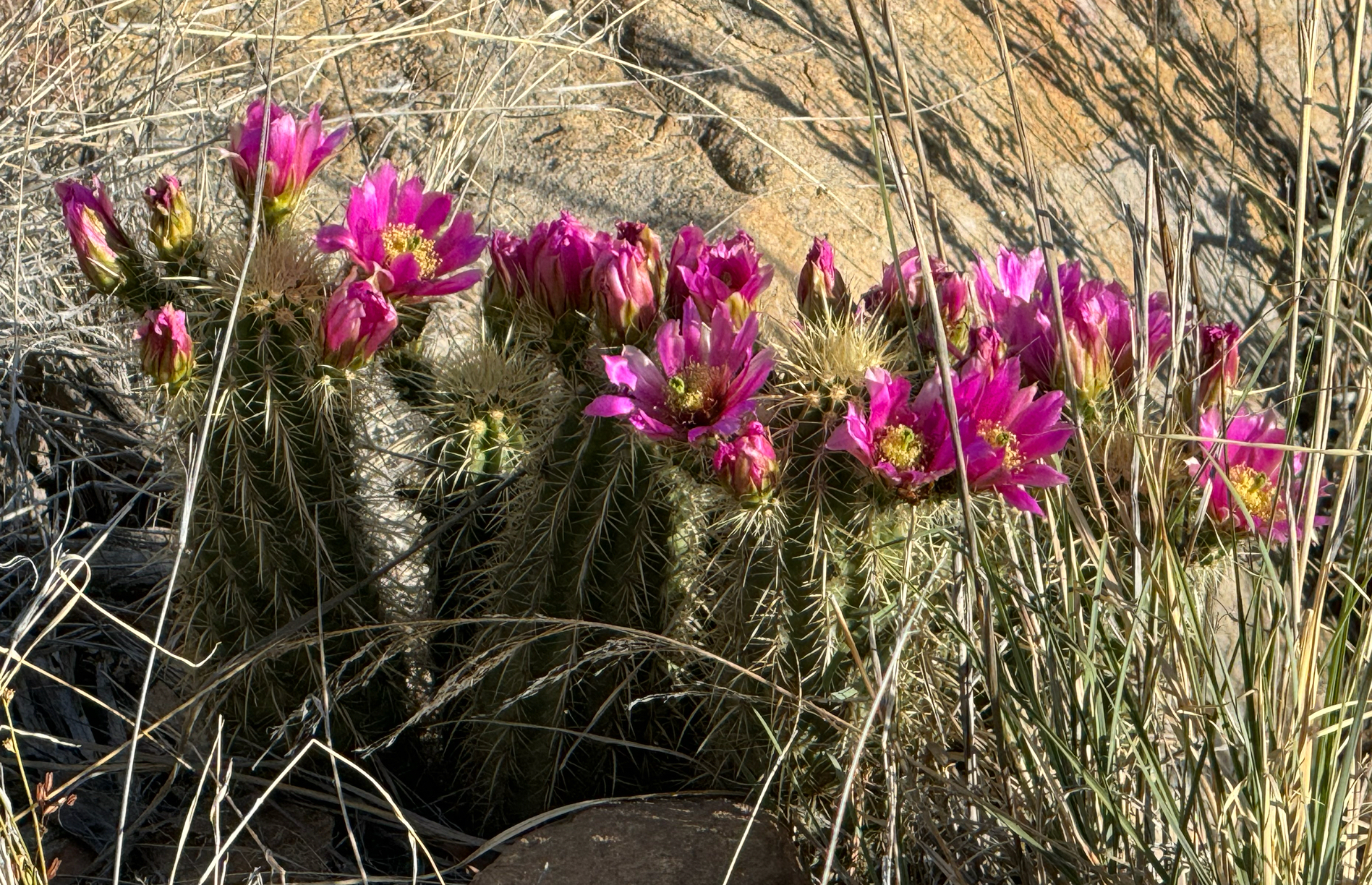
Habitat in Swift Trail Junction, Arizona

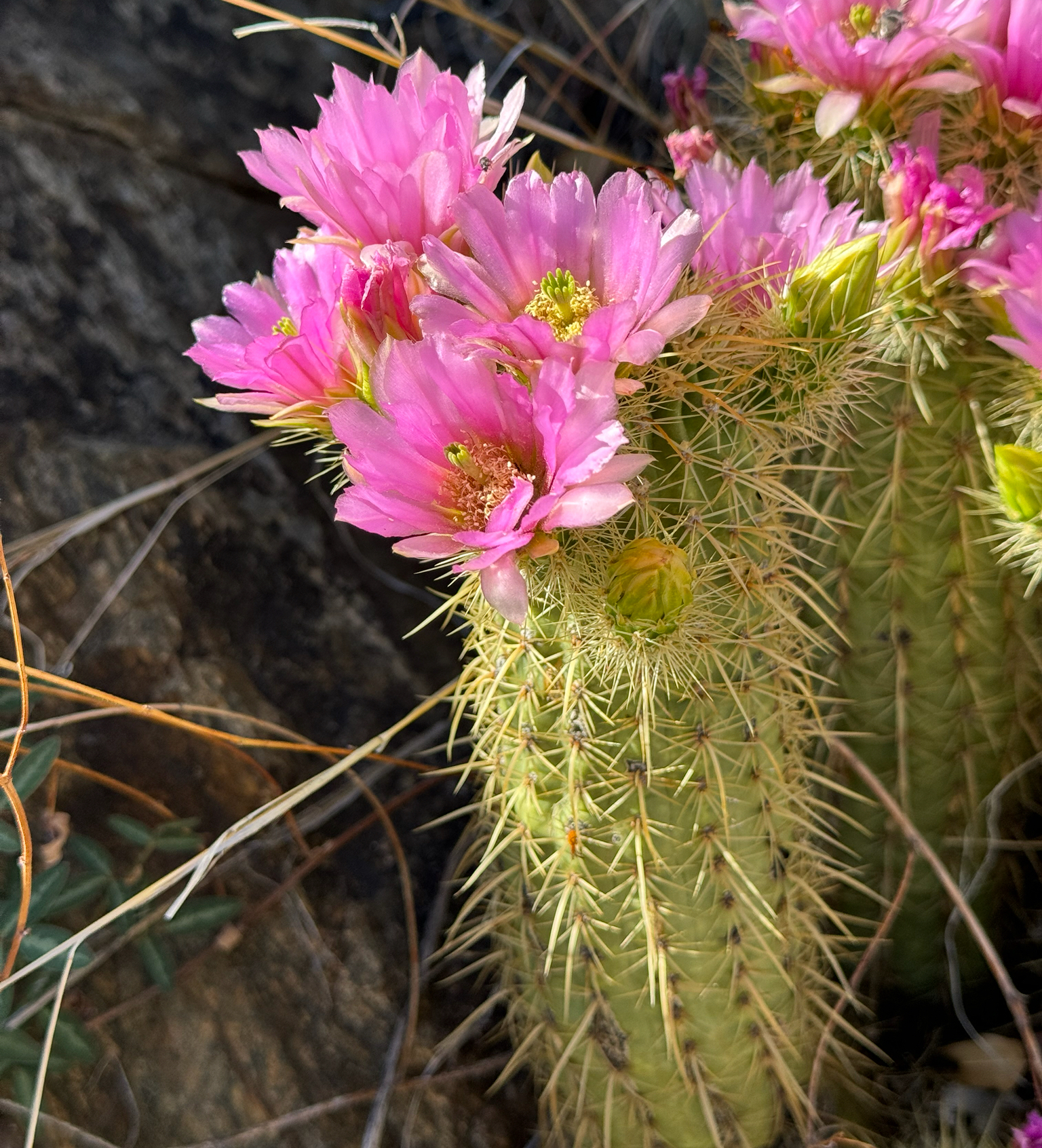
Blooming plant in Swift Trail Junction, Arizona

== Taxonomy ==
Robert Hibbs Peebles first described the species in 1936. The specific epithet ledingii honors A. M. Leding, an American cactus enthusiast from New Mexico.
