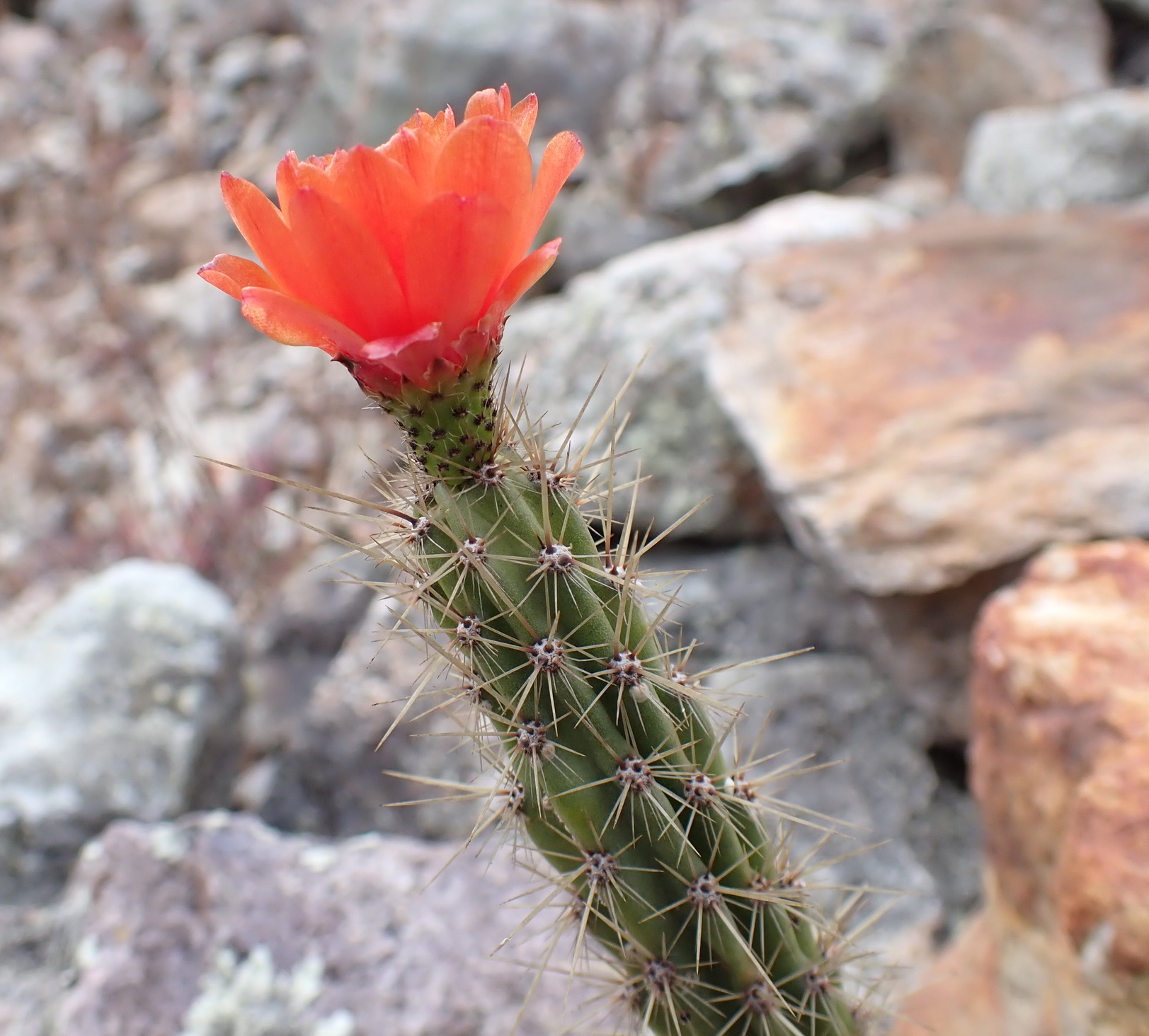

Conservation status
- Vulnerable (IUCN 2.3)

Scientific classification
- Kingdom: Plantae
- Clade: Tracheophytes
- Clade: Angiosperms
- Clade: Eudicots
- Order: Caryophyllales
- Family: Cactaceae
- Subfamily: Cactoideae
- Genus: Corryocactus
- Species: C. erectus

Binomial name
- Corryocactus erectus (Backeb.) F. Ritter 1931

Synonyms
- Erdisia erecta Backeb. 1942; Bolivicereus pisacensis Kníže 1969; Bolivicereus soukupii Kníže i1969; Borzicactus pisacensis (Kníže) G.D.Rowley 1974 publ. 1976; Borzicactus soukupii (Kníže) G.D.Rowley 1974 publ. 1976; Erdisia aureispina Backeb. & H.Jacobsen 1956 publ. 1957; Erdisia ruthae H.Johnson 1962

= Corryocactus erectus =

Species of cactus

Corryocactus erectus or is a species of columnar cactus found in Peru.

== Description ==
Corryocactus erectus grows semi-prostrate to upright, is only slightly branched and reaches heights of up to 1 meter. The slender, cylindrical shoots have a diameter of up to 3 centimeters. There are five to nine narrow, not very prominent ribs. The eight to 18 bright, unequally long thorns that radiate in all directions have a darker base and cannot be differentiated into central and peripheral thorns. They are up to 1 centimeter long.

The light red to vermilion flowers are 2.5 to 4 centimeters long. The bright red fruits reach a diameter of up to 2 centimeters.

== Distribution ==
Corryocactus erectus is found in Cusco, Peru growiung primarily in desert or dry scrub biomes, on cliffs located between 3000 and 3500 meters.

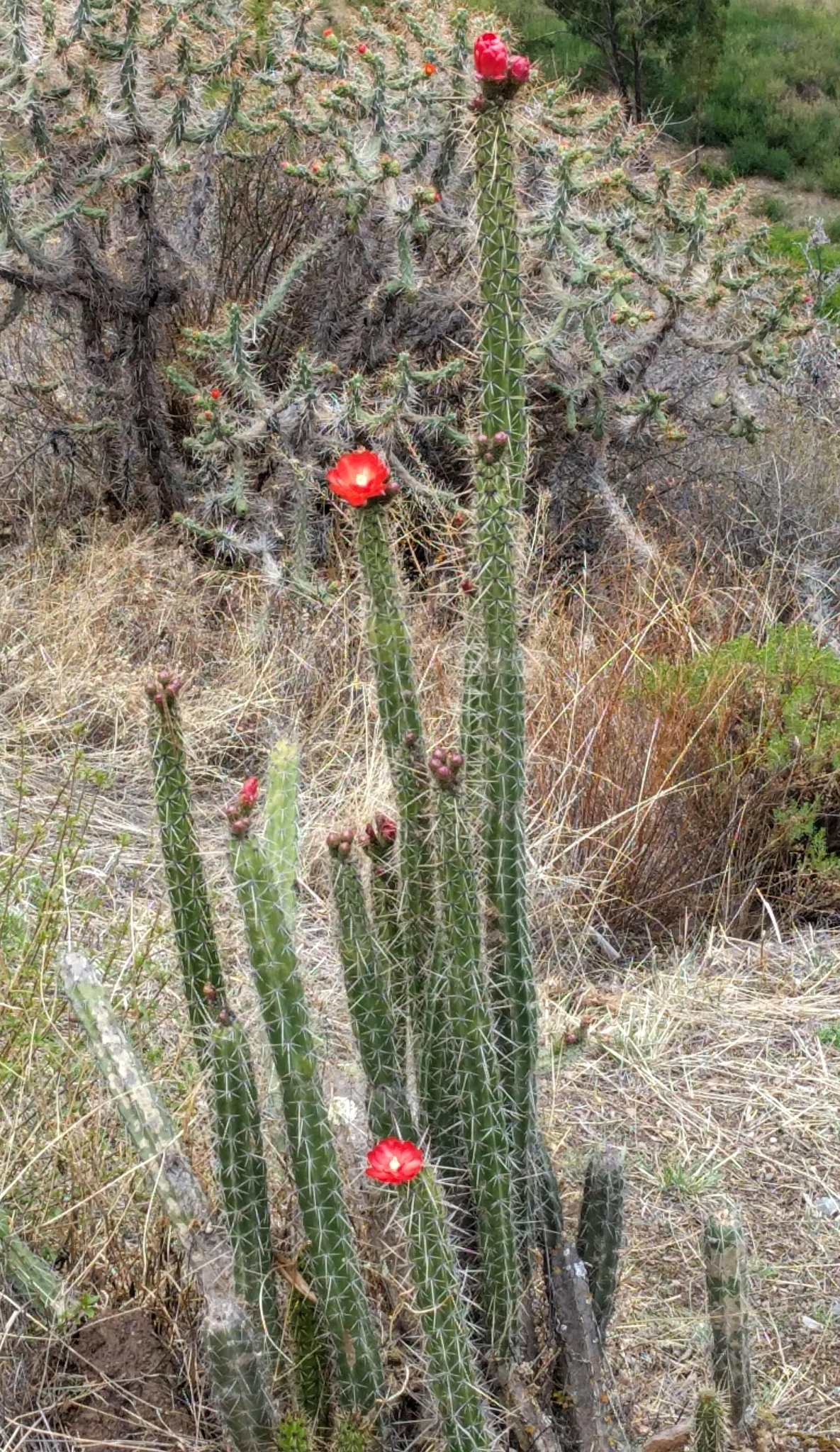
Plant growing in Saylla, Peru

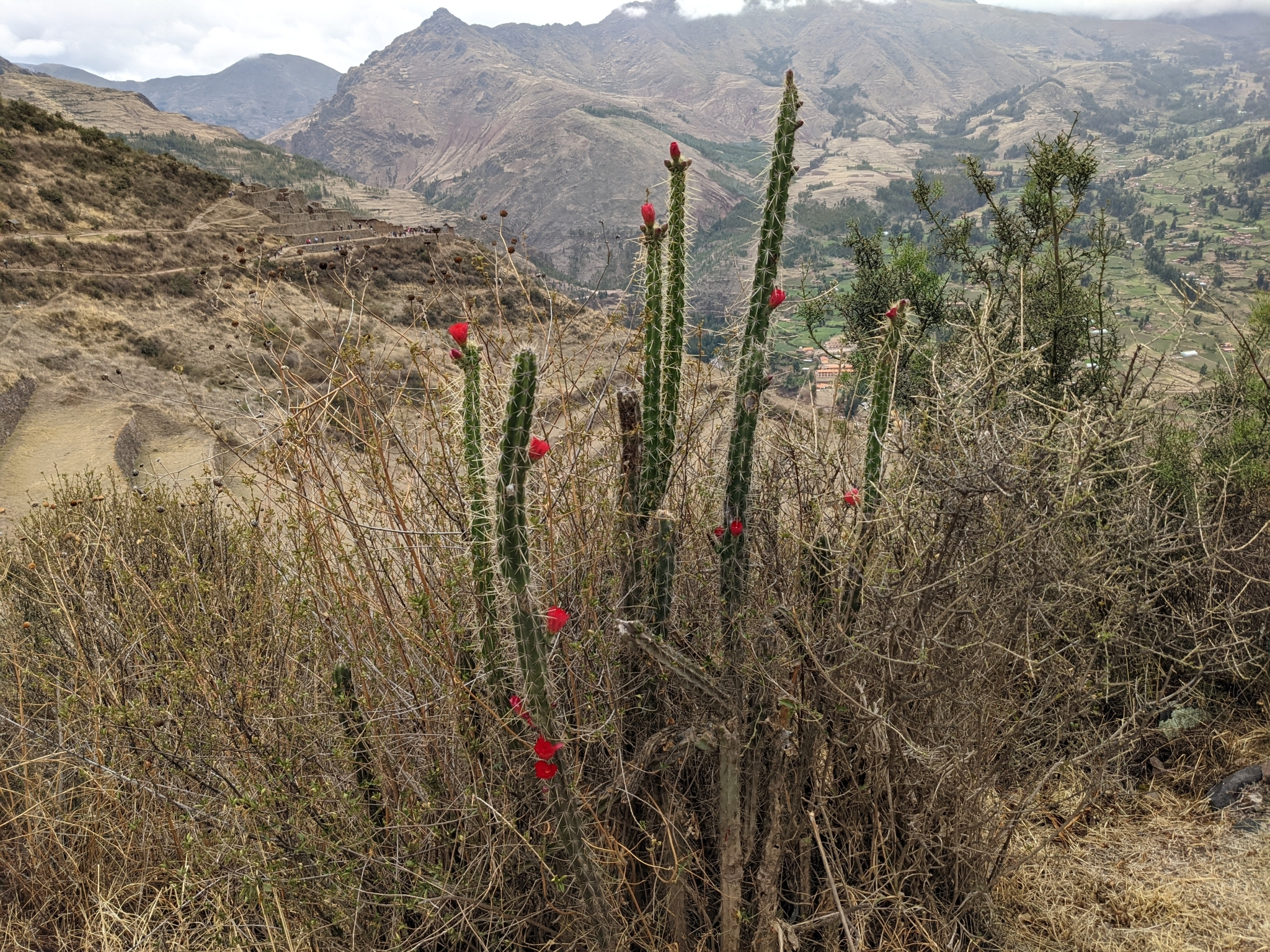
Habitat in Laje dos Negros, Campo Formoso - State of Bahia, Brazil

== Taxonomy ==
The first description as Erdisia erecta was made in 1942 by Curt Backeberg. The specific epithet erectus comes from Latin, means 'upright' and refers to the upright shoots. Friedrich Ritter placed the species in the genus Corryocactus in 1981
