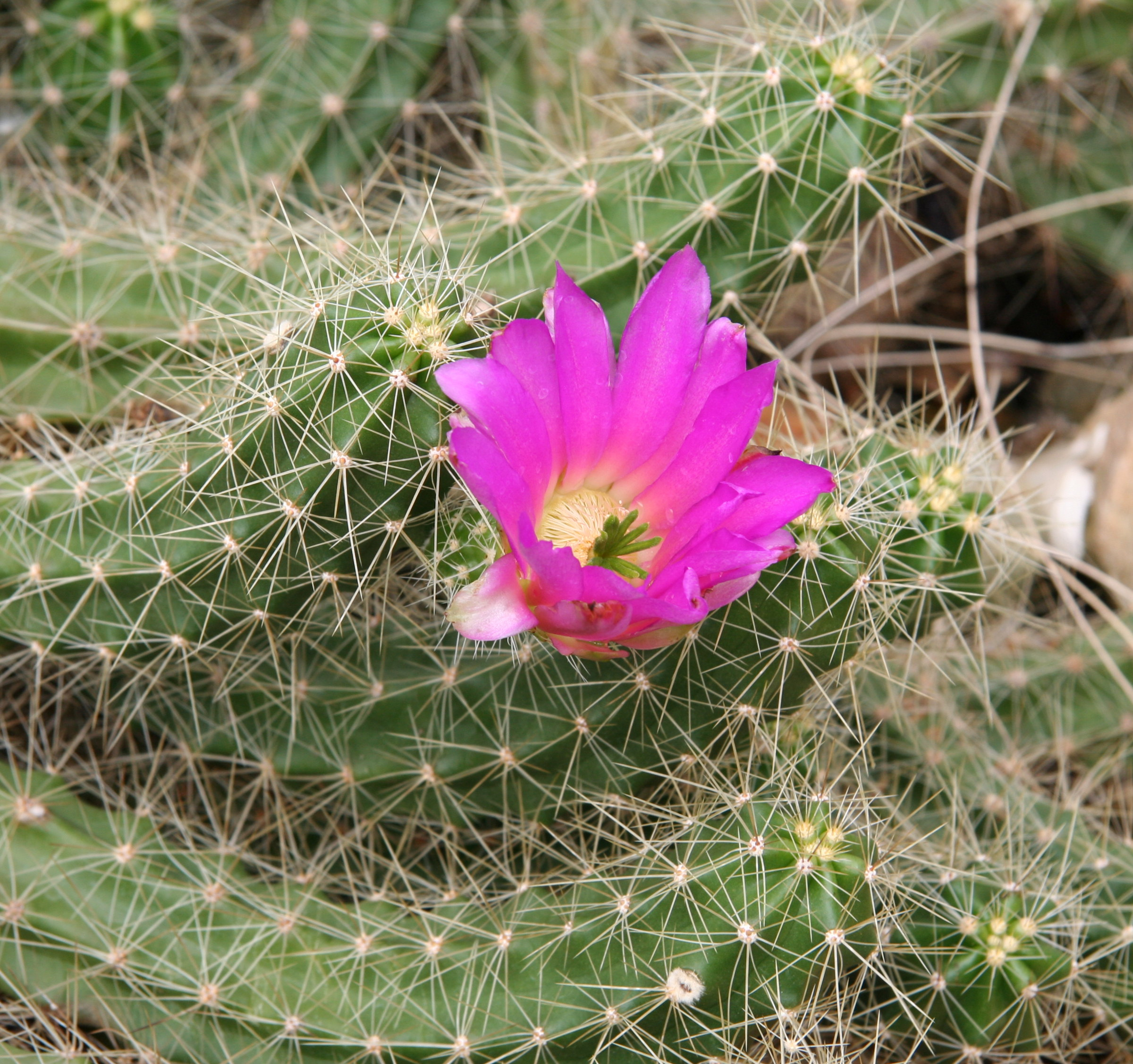

Conservation status
- Least Concern (IUCN 3.1)

Scientific classification
- Kingdom: Plantae
- Clade: Tracheophytes
- Clade: Angiosperms
- Clade: Eudicots
- Order: Caryophyllales
- Family: Cactaceae
- Subfamily: Cactoideae
- Genus: Echinocereus
- Species: E. cinerascens

Binomial name
- Echinocereus cinerascens (DC.) Lem.

Synonyms
- Cereus cinerascens DC. 1828

= Echinocereus cinerascens =

Species of cactus

Echinocereus cinerascens is a species of cactus native from Texas to Mexico.

== Description ==
Echinocereus cinerascens grows with many shoots and usually forms cushions of prostrate to upright shoots. The bright green, cylindrical shoots are up to 30 cm (12 in) long and have a diameter of 1.5 to 12 cm (0.59 to 4.72 in). There are five to twelve ribs, which usually have well-developed cusps, but are occasionally almost uncusped. The one to six protruding to spreading, sometimes criss-crossing central spines are slightly pink or orange and turn brown or even white. They are up to 4.5 cm (1.8 in) long. The six to ten round, yellowish to whitish marginal spines are 1 to 3.5 cm (0.39 to 1.38 in) long.

The broadly funnel-shaped flowers are slightly pink-magenta in color and have a white or very light throat. They appear well below the shoot tips, are 7 to 10 cm (2.8 to 3.9 in) long and reach a diameter of 6 to 12 cm (2.4 to 4.7 in). The green and thorny fruits smell and taste like strawberries.

=== Subspecies ===
Accepted subspecies:

| Image | Scientific name | Distribution |
|---|---|---|
| | Echinocereus cinerascens subsp. cinerascens | Central Mexico |
| | Echinocereus cinerascens subsp. septentrionalis (N.P.Taylor) N.P.Taylor | Mexico (Zacatecas, San Luis Potosí) |
| | Echinocereus cinerascens subsp. tulensis (Bravo) N.P.Taylor | Mexico (Tamaulipas, San Luis Potosí) |

== Distribution ==
Echinocereus cinerascens is distributed in Mexico in the Federal District and the states of México, Hidalgo, Tamaulipas, Querétaro, Guanajuato, Zacatecas and San Luis Potosí.

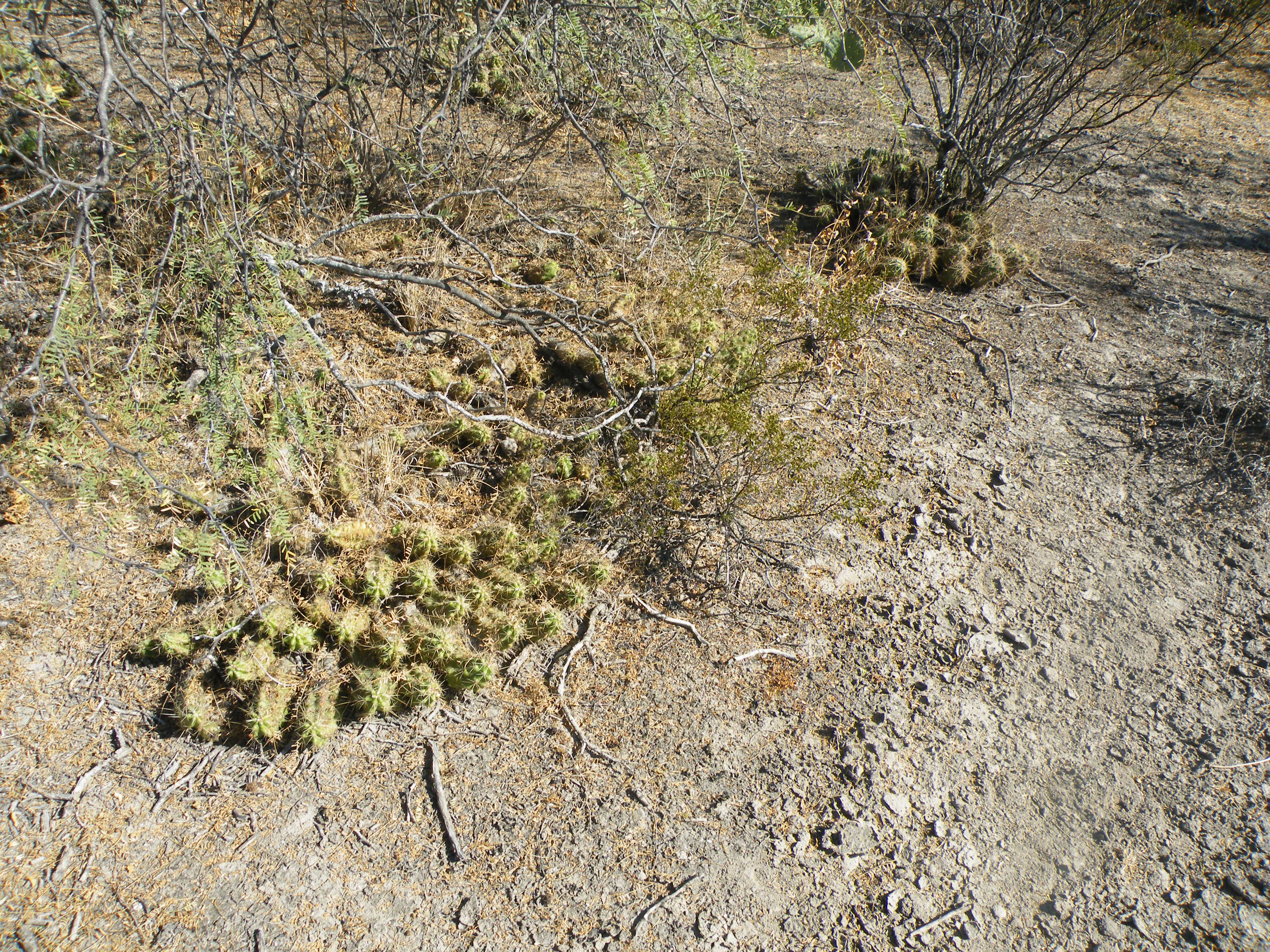
Echinocereus cinerascens ssp. tulensis in habitat in San Luis Potosí

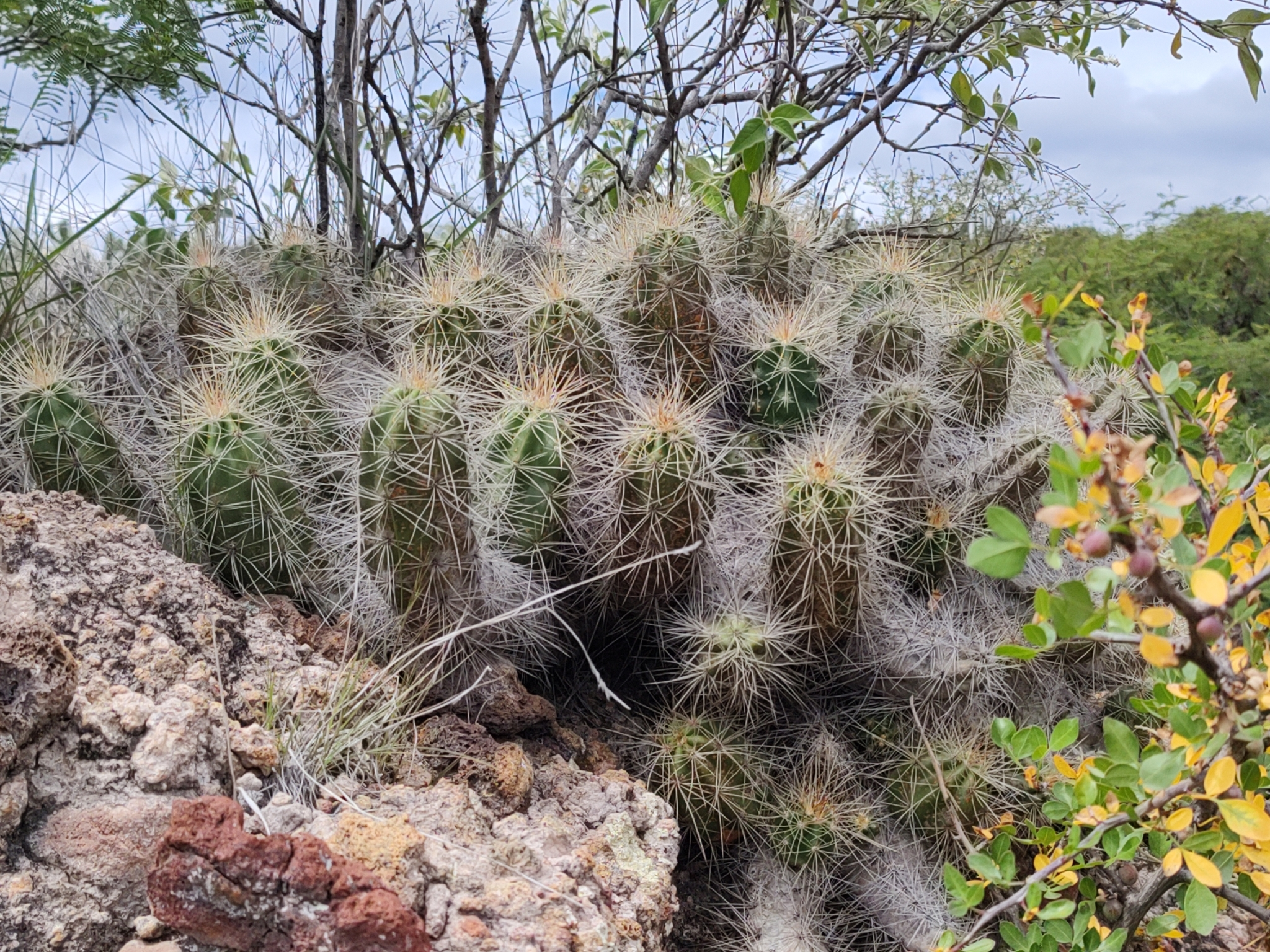
Echinocereus cinerascens ssp. cinerascens in Las Rosas, Querétaro, Mexico

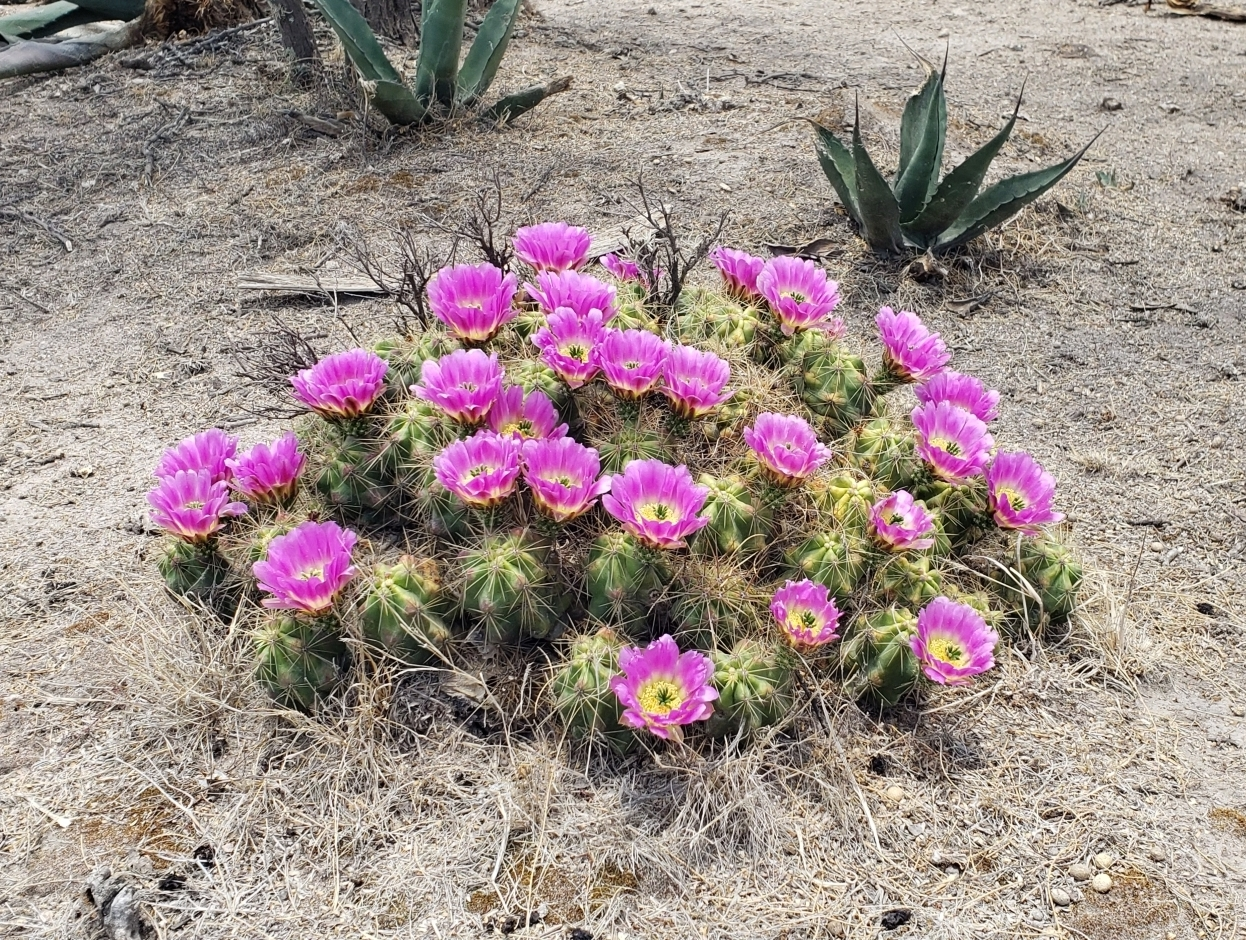
Echinocereus cinerascens ssp. septentrionalis in El Mezquital, San Luis Potosi, Mexico

== Taxonomy ==
The first description as Cereus cinerascens by Augustin-Pyrame de Candolle was published in 1828. The specific epithet cinerascens comes from Latin, means 'turning ashen' and refers to the thorns of the species. Charles Lemaire placed the species in the genus Echinocereus in 1868.
