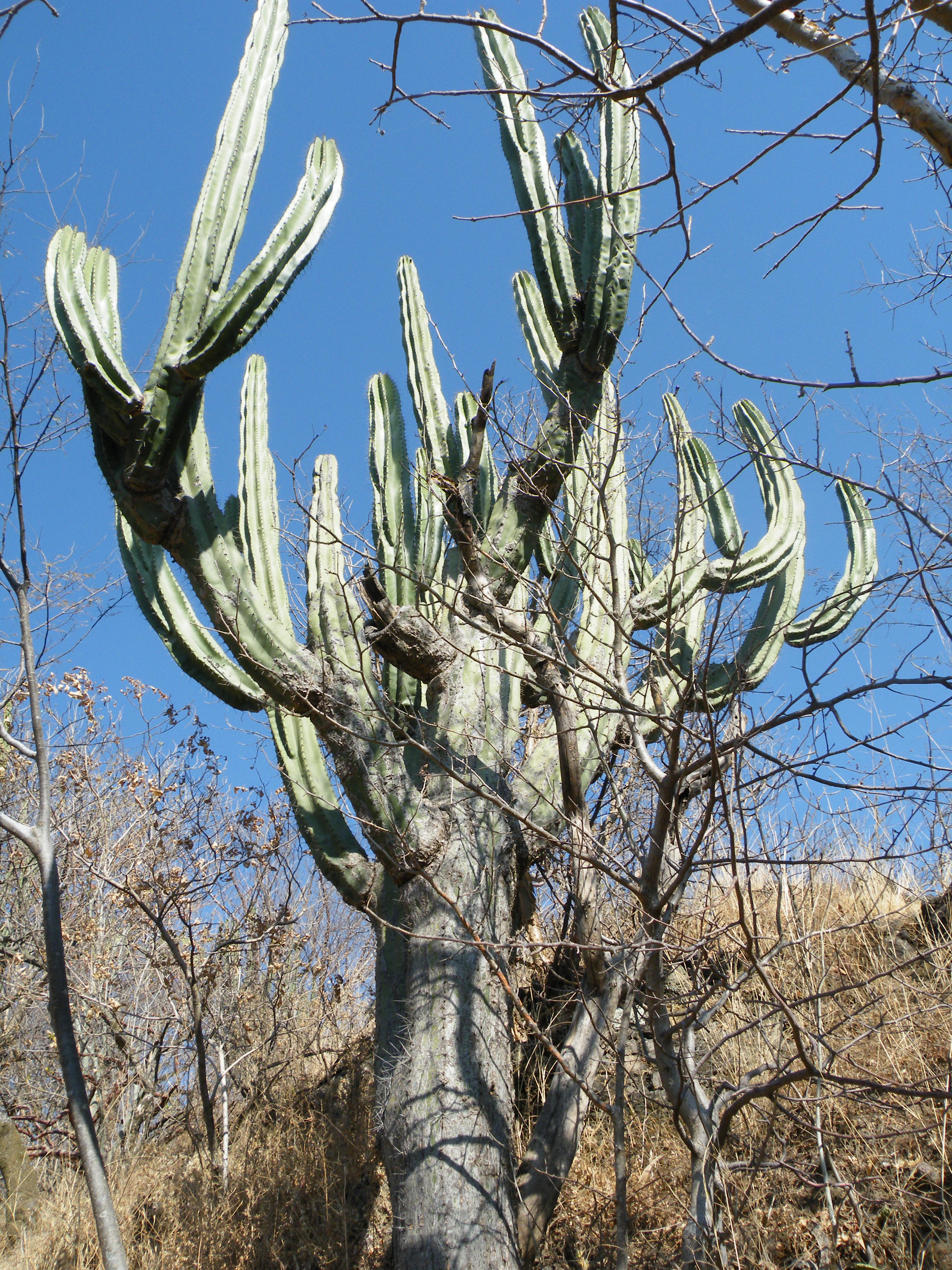

Conservation status
- Least Concern (IUCN 3.1)

Scientific classification
- Kingdom: Plantae
- Clade: Tracheophytes
- Clade: Angiosperms
- Clade: Eudicots
- Order: Caryophyllales
- Family: Cactaceae
- Subfamily: Cactoideae
- Genus: Stenocereus
- Species: S. queretaroensis

Binomial name
- Stenocereus queretaroensis (F.A.C. Weber) Buxbaum 1961

Synonyms
- Cereus quertaroensis F.A.C.Weber ex Mathsson 1961; Pachycereus queretaroensis (F.A.C.Weber ex Mathsson) Britton & Rose 1909; Ritterocereus queretaroensis (F.A.C.Weber ex Mathsson) Backeb. 1951; Glandulicereus quevedonis (J.G.Ortega) Guiggi 2012; Lemaireocereus quevedonis J.G.Ortega 1928; Rathbunia quevedonis (J.G.Ortega) P.V.Heath 1992

= Stenocereus queretaroensis =

Species of cactus

Stenocereus queretaroensis is a species of cactus from Mexico, including the state of Querétaro. It is cultivated for its fruit.

== Description ==
Plants are tree-like growing with multiple candelabra-shaped branches, up to 5–7 m (16–23 ft), with a central trunk followed by many upturned branches, producing a candelabra-like shape. The reddish to green stems are around 15 cm (6 in) across and have six to nine very distinct blunt and slightly rounded ribs. The areoles covered with brown to black, velvety hairs and produce five to nine whitish radial spines, up to 2 cm (0.8 in) long, and one to four somewhat grayer central spines, of which the lower are longer, up to 4 cm (1.6 in). The scented white funnel-shaped flowers are borne from the sides of the ends of the stems and are 7.8–12 cm (3.1–4.7 in) long and have a diameter of 4.5 to 6.7 centimeters. They opening at night and remaining open until the following morning. The flower tube is slightly bulging near the nectar chamber, and both the flower tube and pericarpel are hairless. The fruits, which can be spherical and range in color from green to red or purple, have a diameter of 5 to 6 centimeters and are covered in thorns and hairs. The flesh of the fruit can be white or red to purple.

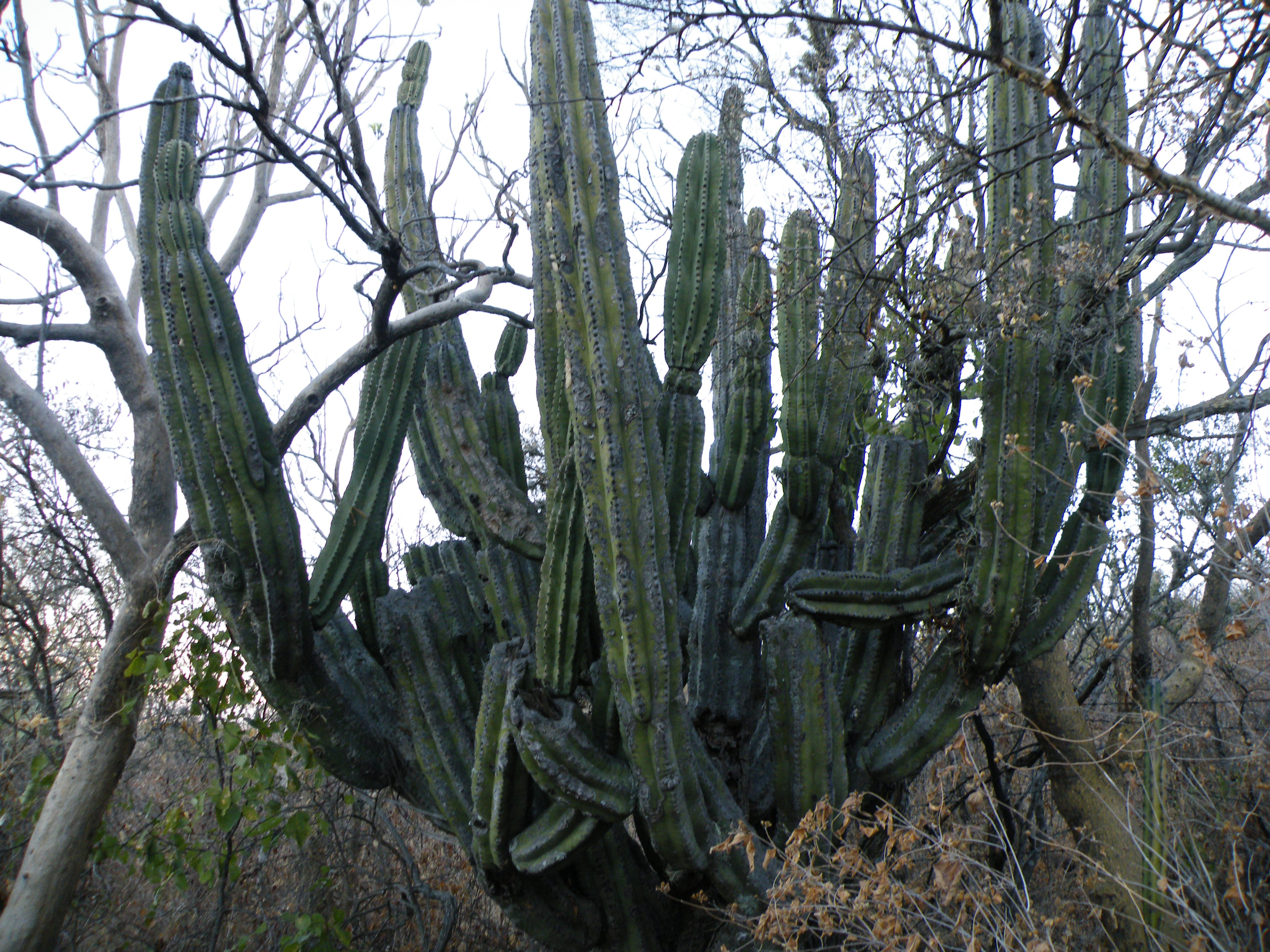
Branching plant

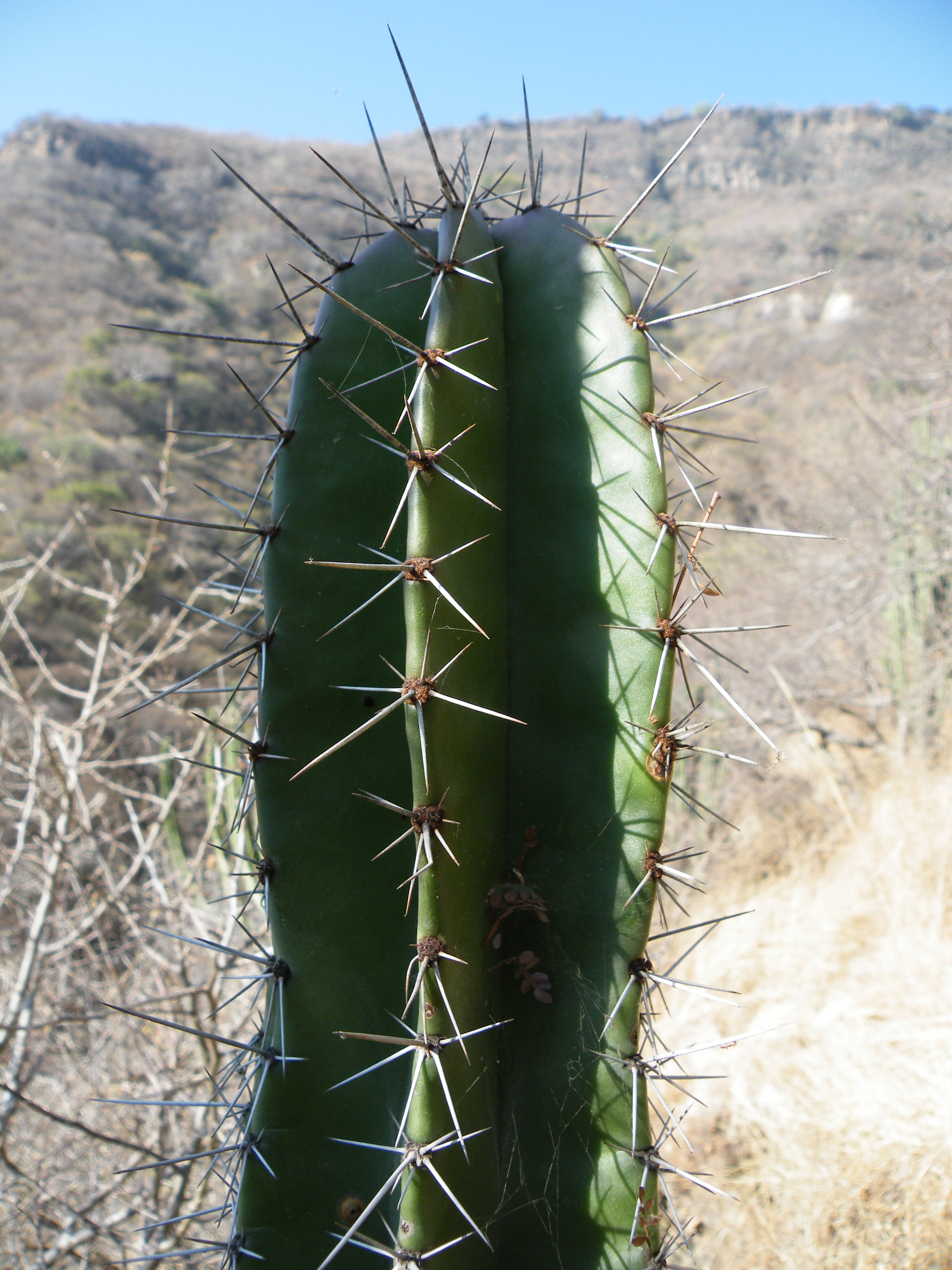
Stem

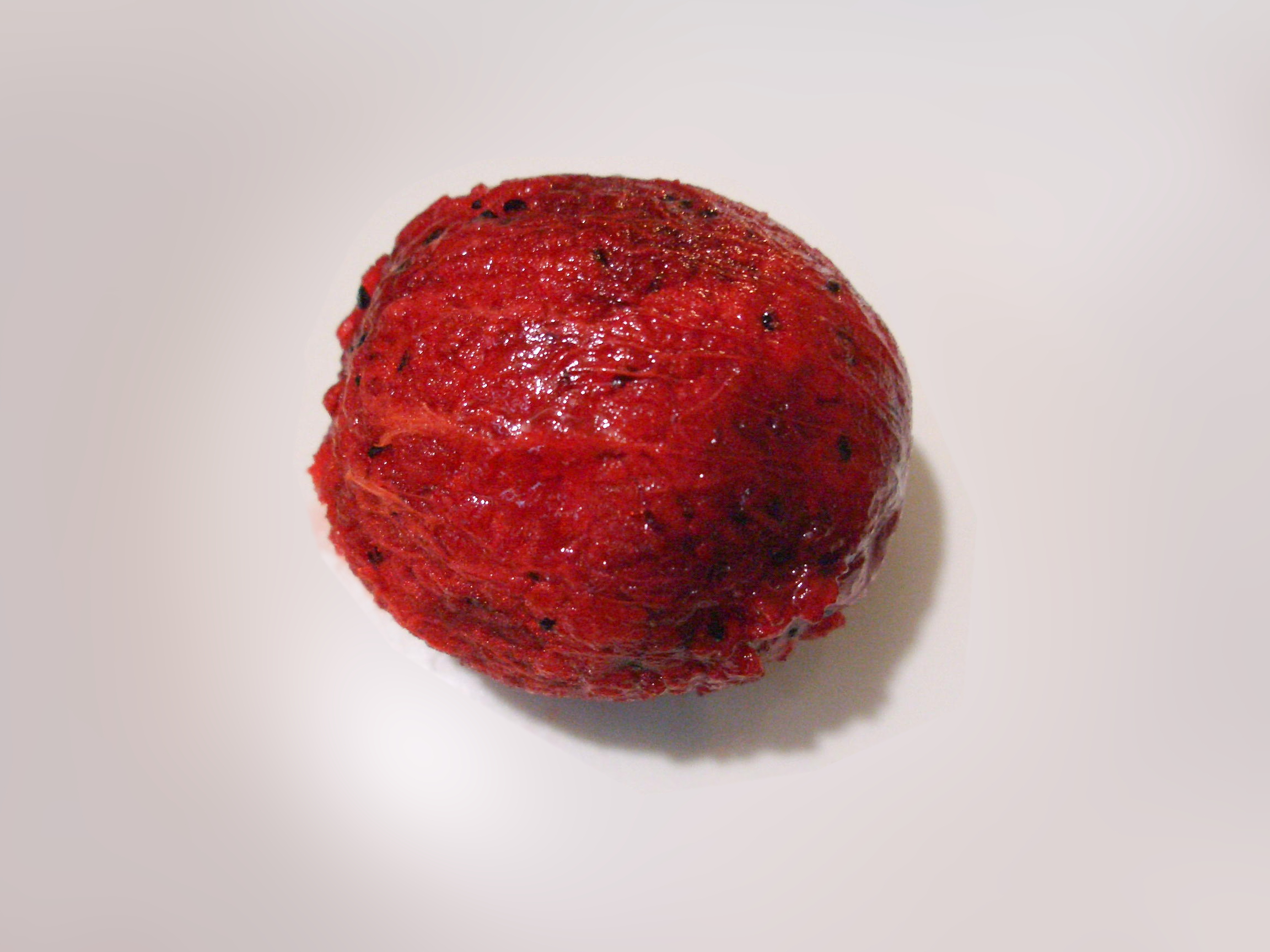
A peeled fruit

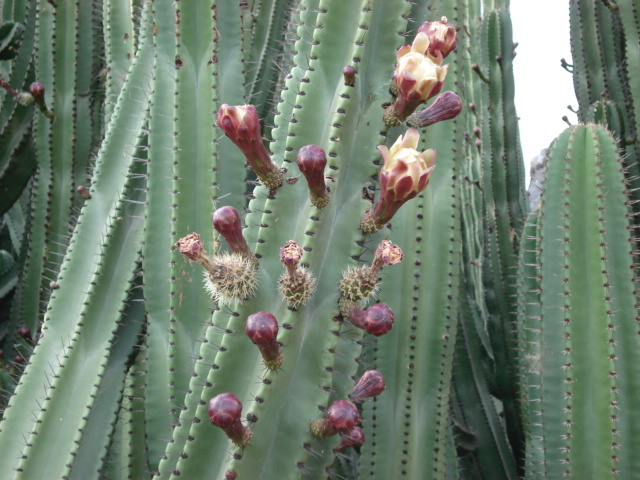
Flowers

== Distribution ==
Stenocereus queretaroensis is commonly found in the Mexican states of Aguascalientes, Colima, Edomex, Guanajuato, Jalisco, Michoacán, Nayarit, Querétaro, and Zacatecas, growing in deciduous forests and dry shrublands at altitudes of 0 to 1800 meters. Plants are found growing along with Ceiba aesculifolia, Neltuma laevigata, Parkinsonia praecox, Celtis pallida, Lophocereus marginatus, Myrtillocactus geometrizans, Pachycereus pecten-aboriginum, and Isolatocereus dumortieri.

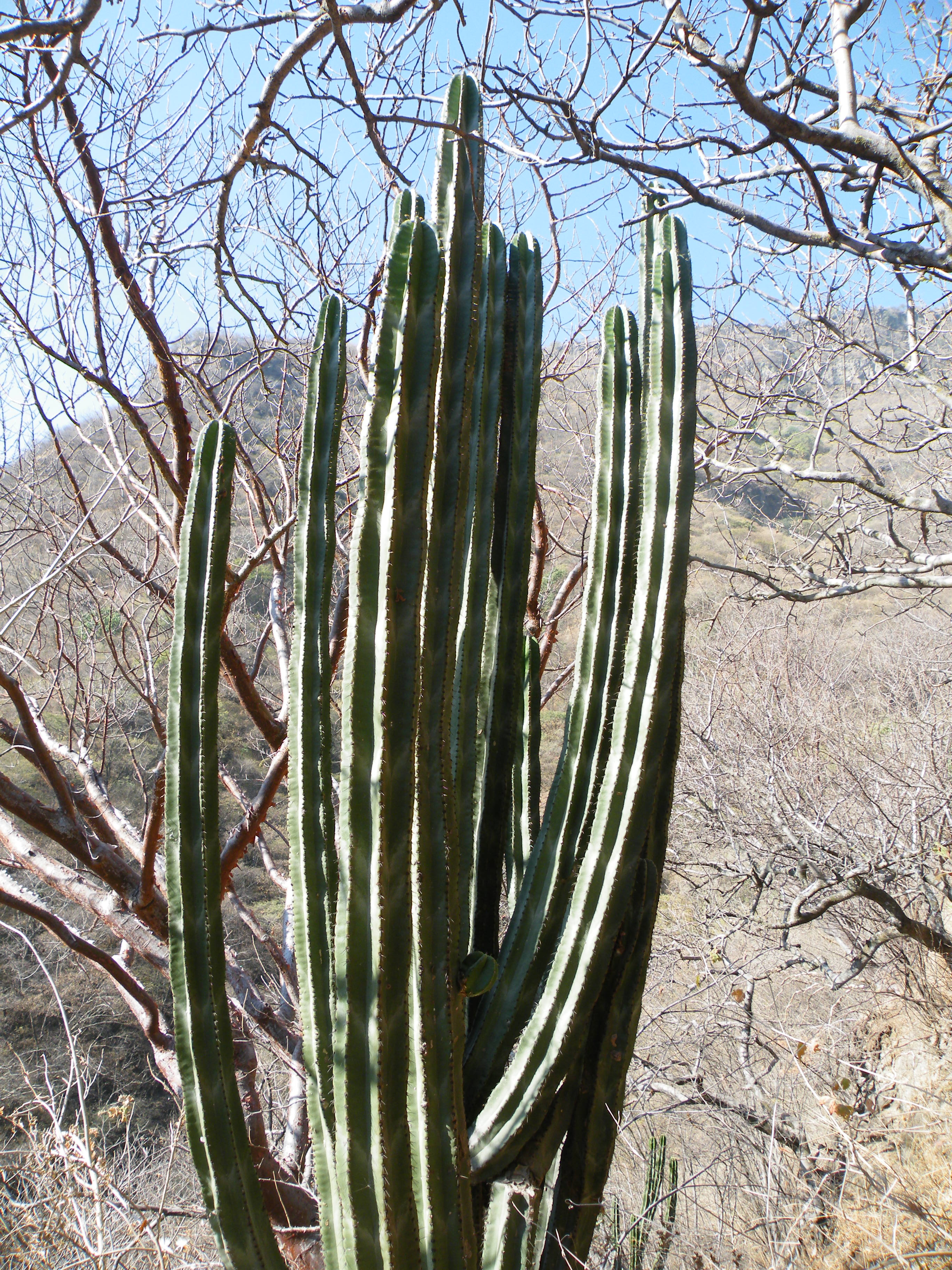
Habitat in Baranca de los Oblatos, Guadajara

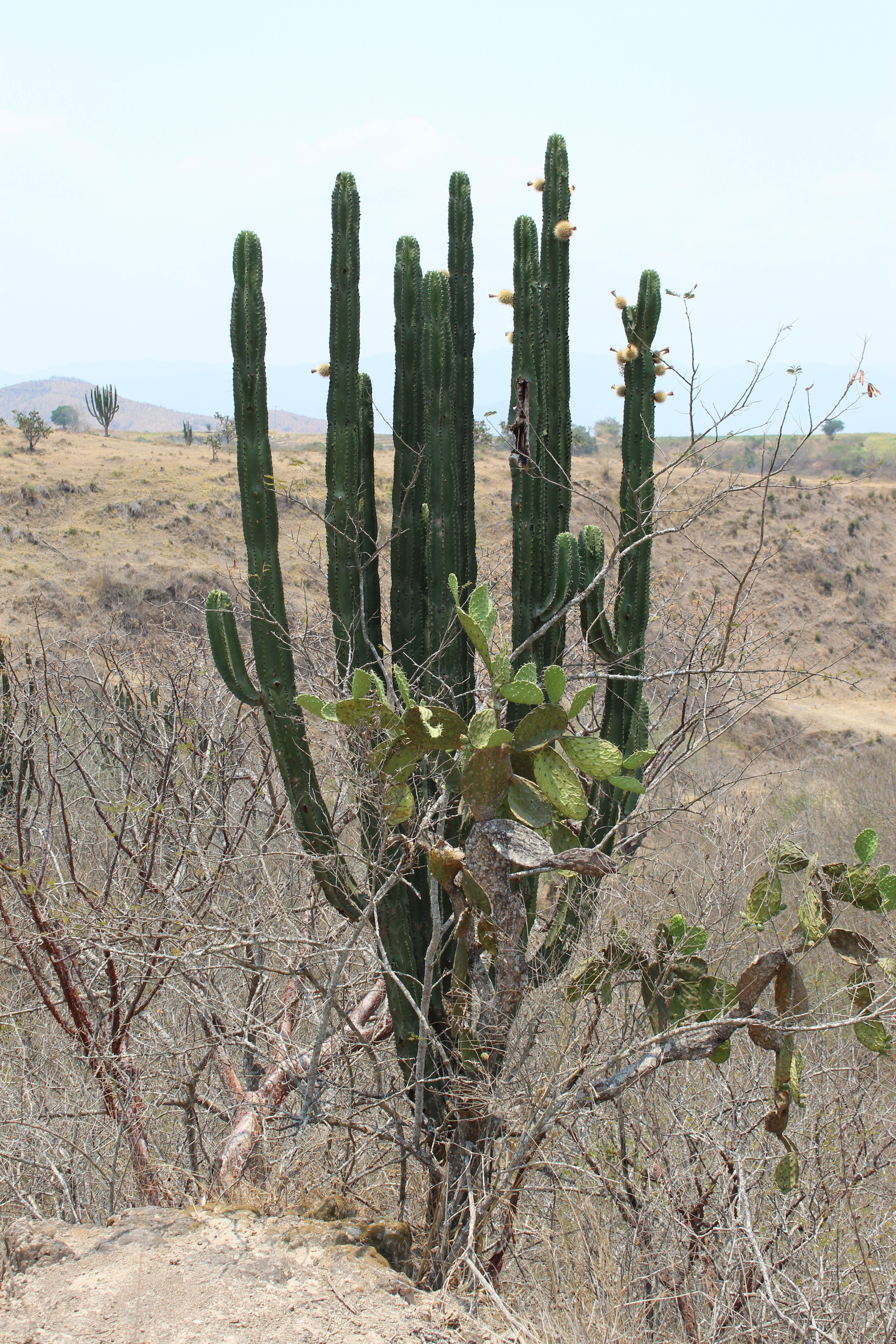
Plant growing in Pitayo en Amacueca, Jalisco

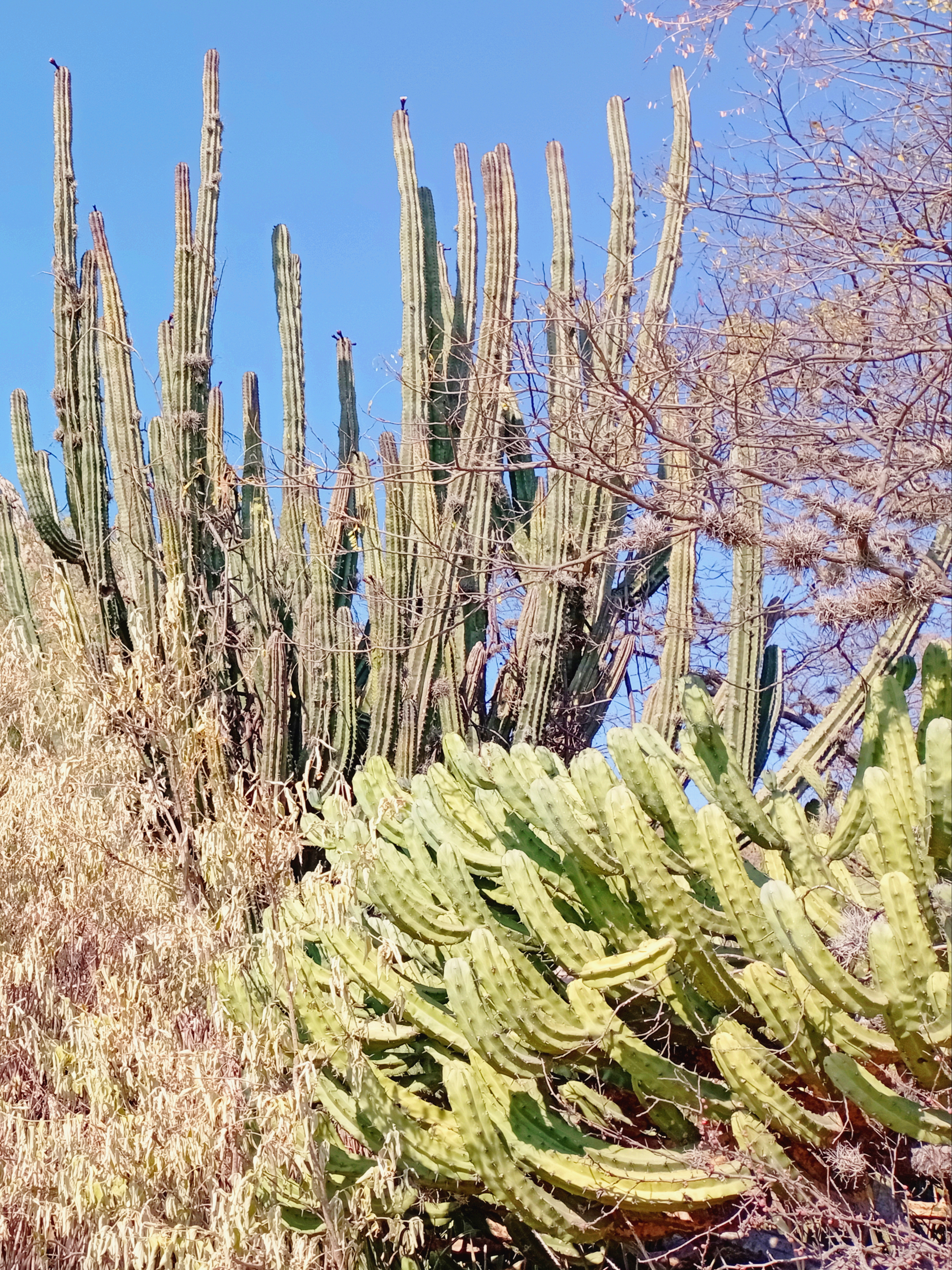
Plant growing with Myrtillocactus geometrizans in Ezequiel Montes, Querétaro, México.

== Taxonomy ==
This species was first described as Cereus queretaroensis by Albert Mathsson in 1891, with the name referencing its native region in Querétaro, Mexico. In 1961, Franz Buxbaum reclassified it under the genus Stenocereus.
