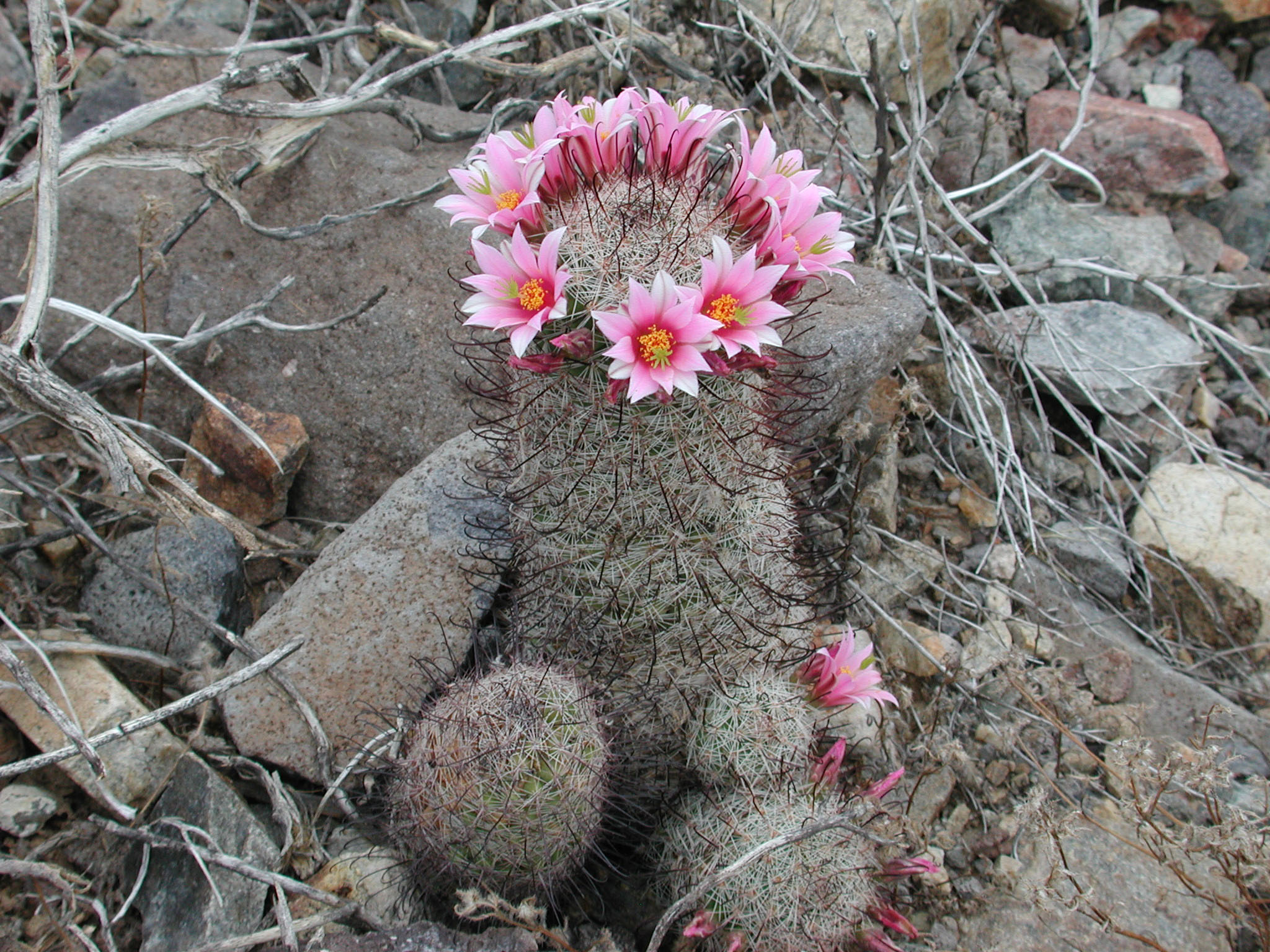

Conservation status
- Least Concern (IUCN 3.1)

Scientific classification
- Kingdom: Plantae
- Clade: Tracheophytes
- Clade: Angiosperms
- Clade: Eudicots
- Order: Caryophyllales
- Family: Cactaceae
- Subfamily: Cactoideae
- Genus: Cochemiea
- Species: C. grahamii

Binomial name
- Cochemiea grahamii (Engelm.) Doweld
- Cochemiea grahamii range map, estimated with the iNaturalist Geomodel, 2025

Synonyms
- Cactus grahamii (Engelm.) Kuntze; Chilita grahamii (Engelm.) Orcutt; Coryphantha grahamii (Engelm.) Rydb.; Mammillaria grahamii Engelm.; Mammillaria microcarpa subsp. grahamii (Engelm.) Mottram; Mammillaria milleri var. grahamii (Engelm.) Neutel.

= Cochemiea grahamii =

Species of cactus

Cochemiea grahamii is a species of cactus also known by the names Arizona fishhook cactus and Graham's nipple cactus.

== Description ==
Cochemiea grahamii grows either solitary or branching from the base, with thickened roots and hooked stems. Its spherical to short cylindrical light green shoots reach heights of 7 to 20 cm (2.8 to 7.9 in), sometimes more, and have diameters of 7.5 to 11 cm (3.0 to 4.3 in). The plant has cylindrical to egg-shaped, often square, warts that lack milky juice, with naked axillae. It has 1 to 4 central spines that are yellowish-brown to dark brown, measuring 1.2 to 2.5 cm (0.47 to 0.98 in) long, with the longest usually being hooked. There are also 20 to 35 straight, needle-like marginal spines, white to light brown or reddish, 0.6 to 1.2 cm (0.24 to 0.47 in) long.

This cactus has flowers pink or lavender in April and May. The flowers range from lavender-pink to reddish purple, sometimes white, and are 2 to 4.5 cm (0.79 to 1.77 in) in diameter. The almost spherical, red fruits are 1.2 to 2.5 cm (0.47 to 0.98 in) long and contain black seeds.

== Distribution ==
Cochemiea grahamii is found in Arizona, California, New Mexico, and Texas in the United States, and in Sonora, Sinaloa, and Chihuahua in Mexico at elevations of 200 to 1800 meters growing in dry habitat of gravel or grassland, desert mountains, sandy or rocky canyons, washes and plains on igneous or limestone substrate. Plants are found growing among Larrea tridentata or in grasslands.

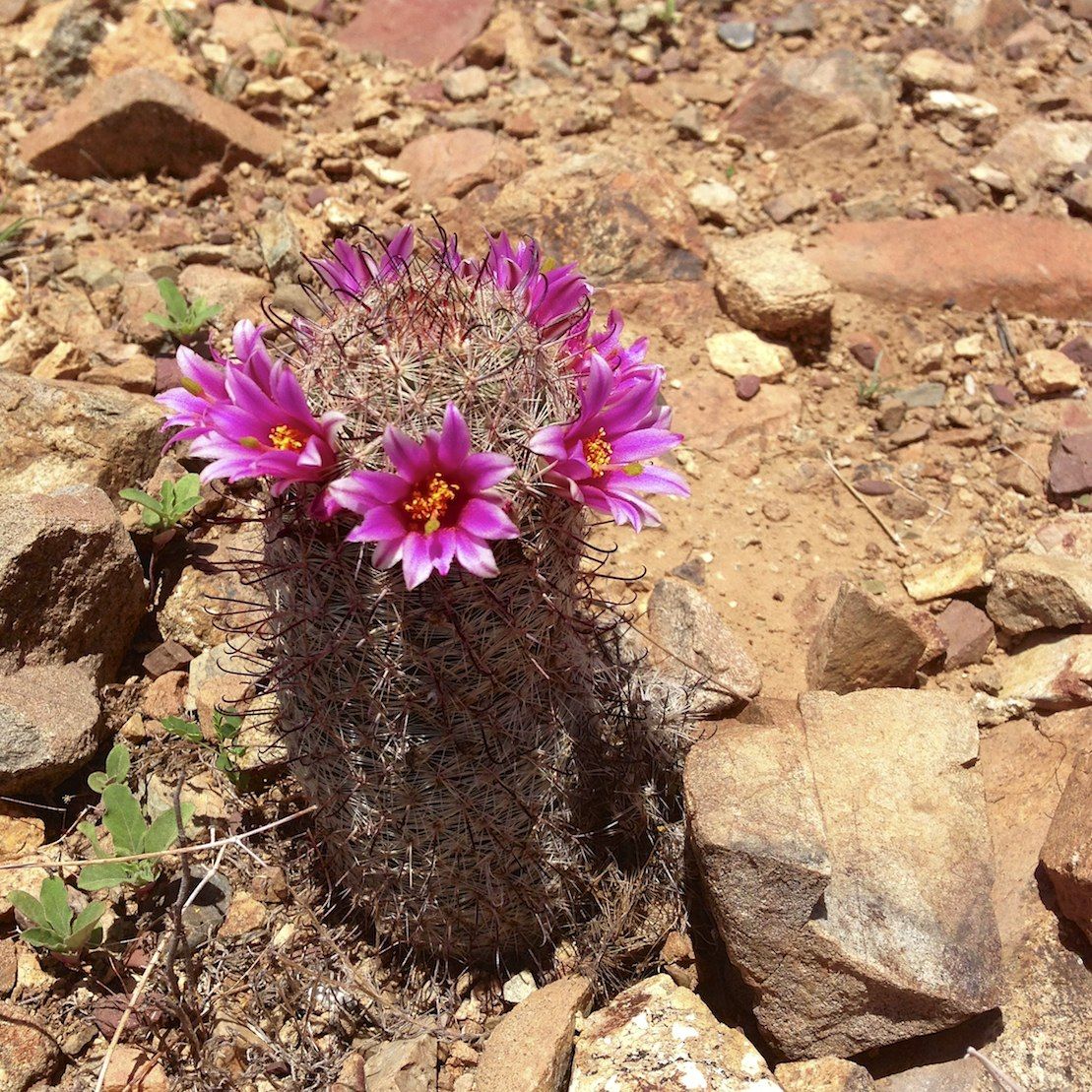
Plant growing near Saguaro National Park

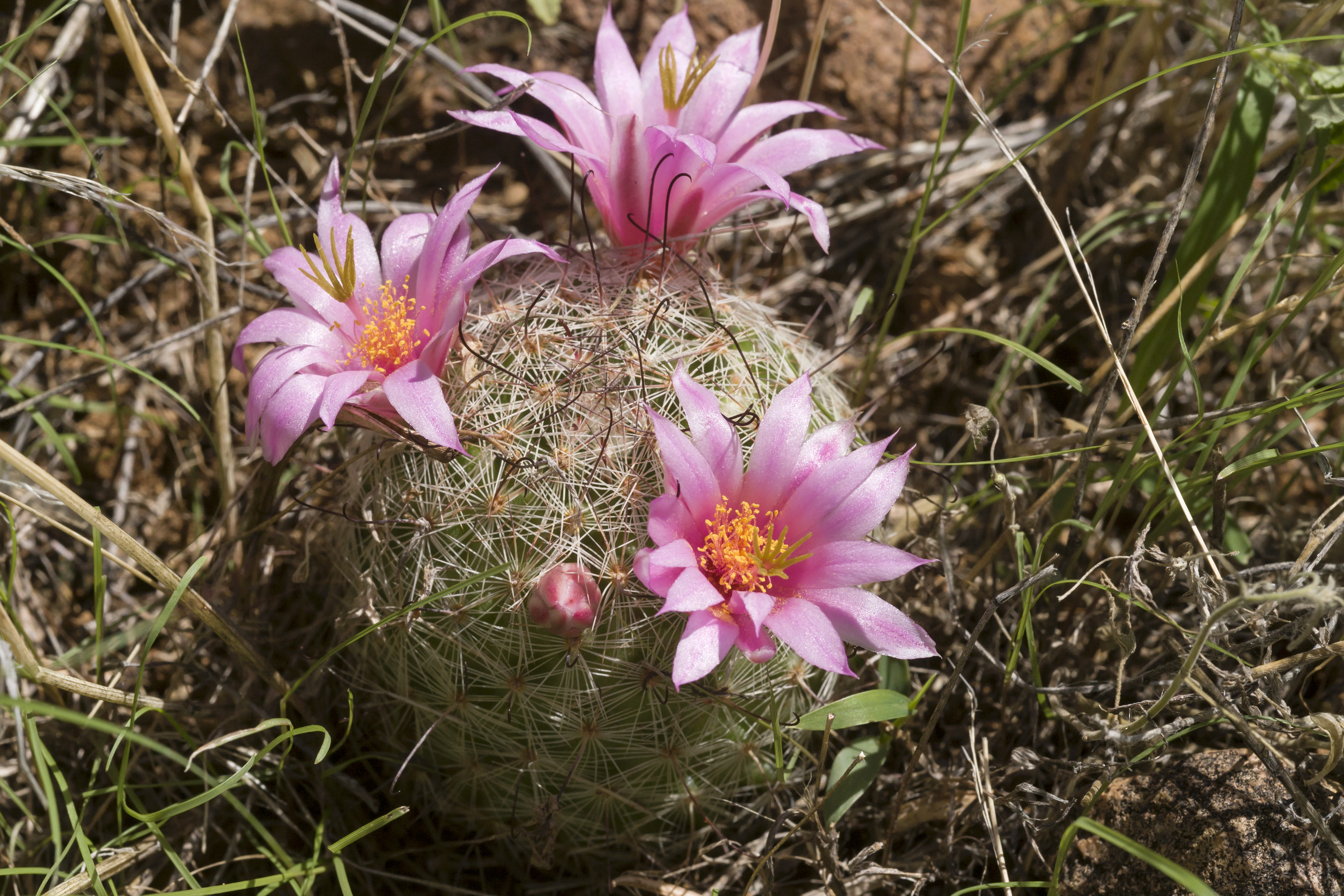
Plant growing in Luna County, New Mexico

== Taxonomy ==
Originally described as Mammillaria grahamii by George Engelmann in 1856, the specific epithet honors American topographer Colonel James Duncan Graham (1799–1865), who led the scientific corps surveying the US-Mexico border. Alexander Borissovitch Doweld reclassified the species to the genus Cochemiea in 2000.
