= Hylocereus =

Genus of cacti

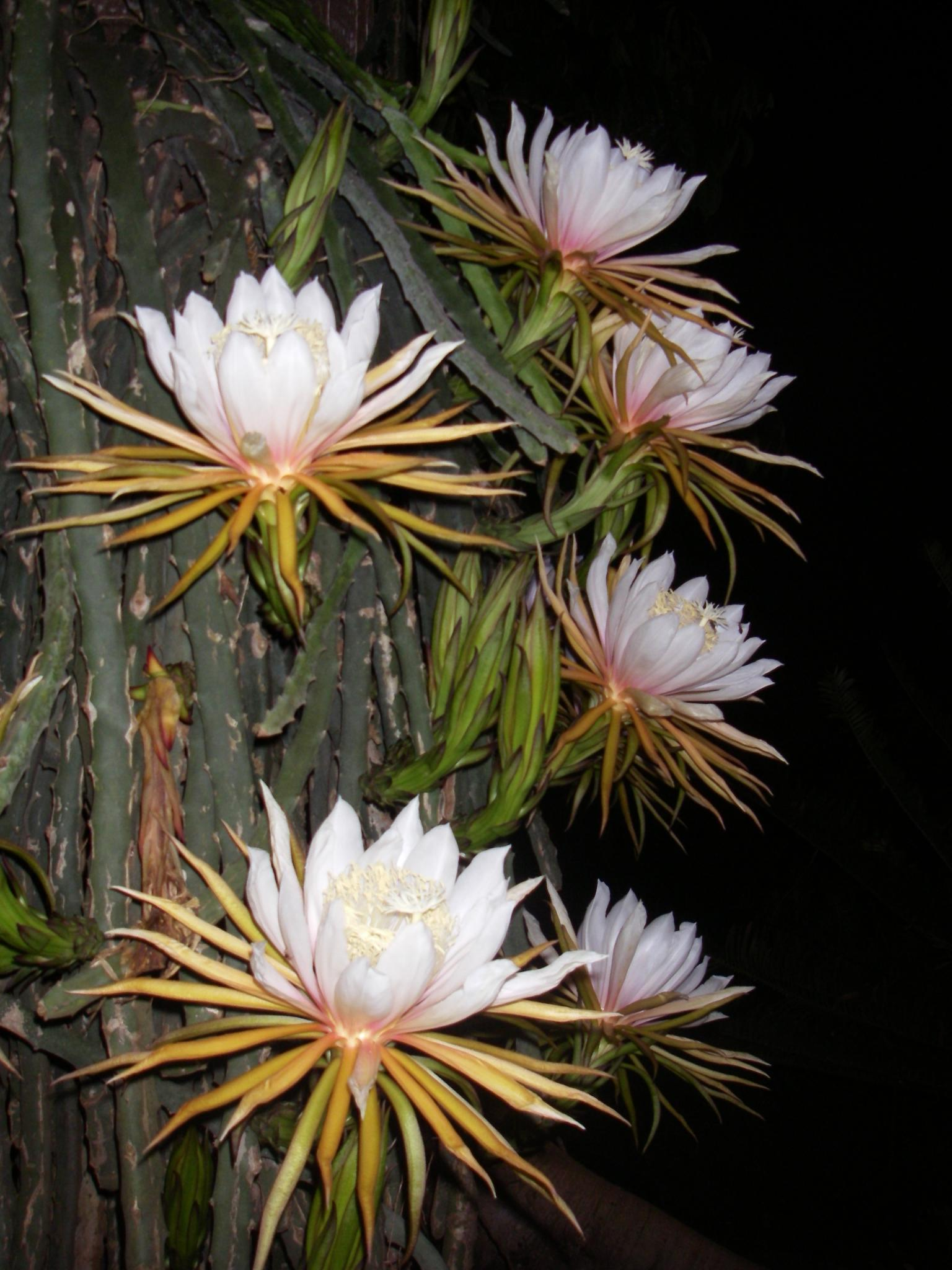
Selenicereus monacanthus, formerly Hylocereus monacanthus

Hylocereus is a former genus of epiphytic cacti, often referred to as night-blooming cactus (though the term is also used for many other cacti). Several species previously placed in the genus have large edible fruits, which are known as pitayas, pitahayas or dragonfruits. In 2017, a molecular phylogenetic study confirmed an earlier finding that the genus Hylocereus was nested within Selenicereus, so all the species of Hylocereus were transferred to Selenicereus.

== Description ==
The species previously placed in the genus Hylocereus grow hanging, climbing or epiphytic. They are freely branched, shrubby plants that form aerial roots and become very large with a height of 10 m or more. The green, often glaucous shoots are usually terete or triangular.

== Taxonomy ==
In the 1994 classification of the International Cactaceae Systematics Group of the International Organization for Succulent Plant Study, the genus Hylocereus was one of the six genera of the tribe Hylocereeae. A 2011 study of the molecular phylogeny of the Cactaceae concluded that neither the tribe nor the genus was monophyletic (i.e. neither comprised all the descendants of a common ancestor). Two species of Hylocereus formed a clade with two species of Selenicereus, suggesting that the genera were not distinct. This result was confirmed in a larger study in 2017, and all the species of Hylocereus were transferred to Selenicereus.

== Species ==
Species that were placed in the genus in 2012 that are now placed in Selenicereus include the following.

- Hylocereus calcaratus (F.A.C. Weber) Britton & Rose → Selenicereus calcaratus
- Hylocereus costaricensis (F.A.C. Weber) Britton & Rose → Selenicereus costaricensis
- Hylocereus escuintlensis Kimnach → Selenicereus escuintlensis
- Hylocereus megalanthus (K. Schum. ex Vaupel) Ralf Bauer → Selenicereus megalanthus
- Hylocereus monacanthus (Lem.) Britton & Rose → Selenicereus monacanthus
- Hylocereus minutiflorus Britton & Rose → Selenicereus minutiflorus
- Hylocereus ocamponis (Salm-Dyck) Britton & Rose → Selenicereus ocamponis
- Hylocereus setaceus (Salm-Dyck ex DC.) Ralf Bauer → Selenicereus setaceus
- Hylocereus stenopterus (F.A.C. Weber) Britton & Rose → Selenicereus stenopterus
- Hylocereus triangularis (L.) Britton & Rose → Selenicereus triangularis
- Hylocereus trigonus (Haw.) Saff. → Selenicereus trigonus
- Hylocereus undatus (Haw.) Britton & Rose → Selenicereus undatus

== See also ==
- Epiphyllum – another cactus genus yielding edible fruits
