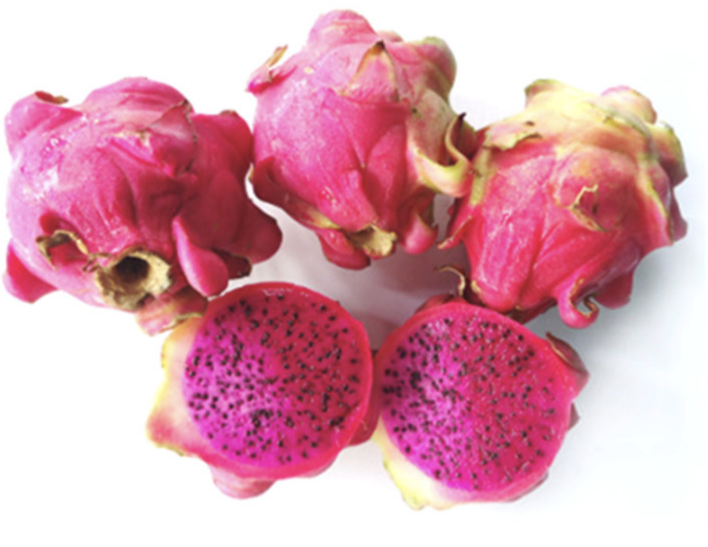
- Fruit

Scientific classification
- Kingdom: Plantae
- Clade: Tracheophytes
- Clade: Angiosperms
- Clade: Eudicots
- Order: Caryophyllales
- Family: Cactaceae
- Subfamily: Cactoideae
- Genus: Selenicereus
- Species: S. purpusii

Binomial name
- Selenicereus purpusii (Weing.) S.Arias & N.Korotkova, 2018

Synonyms
- Cereus purpusii Weing., 1909; Hylocereus purpusii (Weing.) Britton & Rose, 1920

= Selenicereus purpusii =

Species of cactus

Selenicereus purpusii is a climbing cactus in the family Cactaceae native to Mexico; its edible fruit is a type of red‑fleshed dragon fruit.

== Distribution ==
This species is endemic to Mexico, occurring in the central, northeastern and southwestern parts of the country. The type locality is near Tuxpan in the state of Veracruz. It grows in seasonally dry tropical forests.

== Morphology ==
Stems bluish, climbing, elongate, epiphytic; ribs 3 or 4, with horny margins only slightly undulate; areoles small; spines 3 to 6, short; flowers large, 25 cm. long and nearly as broad when fully expanded; outer perianth-segments narrow, purplish; middle perianth-segments golden; inner perianth-segments broad, white except at the golden tips. The fruit is 10–15 cm long and weighs 150–400 g; its skin is light or dark red and the flesh is red.

== Reproductive ecology ==
The flowers open in the evening and close the following morning, remaining open for about 12 hours. The species is self‑incompatible and cannot set fruit without cross‑pollination between genetically different individuals. Effective pollinators include bees, bats and hawkmoths, with bees being the most efficient. Flowering occurs from April to September, with three to four peaks per season.

Crosses between Selenicereus purpusii and the closely related Selenicereus ocamponis are highly compatible; the fruit set in interspecific crosses (95%) is much higher than in intraspecific crosses (47.5%), and the hybrids are fertile. In Mexican plantations, the co‑flowering Stenocereus queretaroensis is more abundant and competes for the same bat pollinators, further reducing the fruit set of S. purpusii.

== Conservation status ==
The species is considered endangered due to habitat loss, strict dependence on cross‑pollination, and declining pollinator populations. Agricultural expansion (especially avocado orchards) has reduced native forests, and the use of insecticides directly threatens pollinating insects such as bees and bats. Moreover, the widespread cultivation of the concurrently flowering Stenocereus queretaroensis in the same areas competes for pollination services, further reducing the reproductive success of S. purpusii.

To address this crisis, ex situ conservation has been initiated in Mexico, with cultivated populations established in places like Jalisco. In vitro propagation techniques have been successfully developed for germplasm preservation and multiplication of this species. Researchers recommend reducing pesticide use within its natural range, protecting pollinator habitats, and prioritising the cultivation of plants near wild populations to maintain gene flow and natural regeneration.
