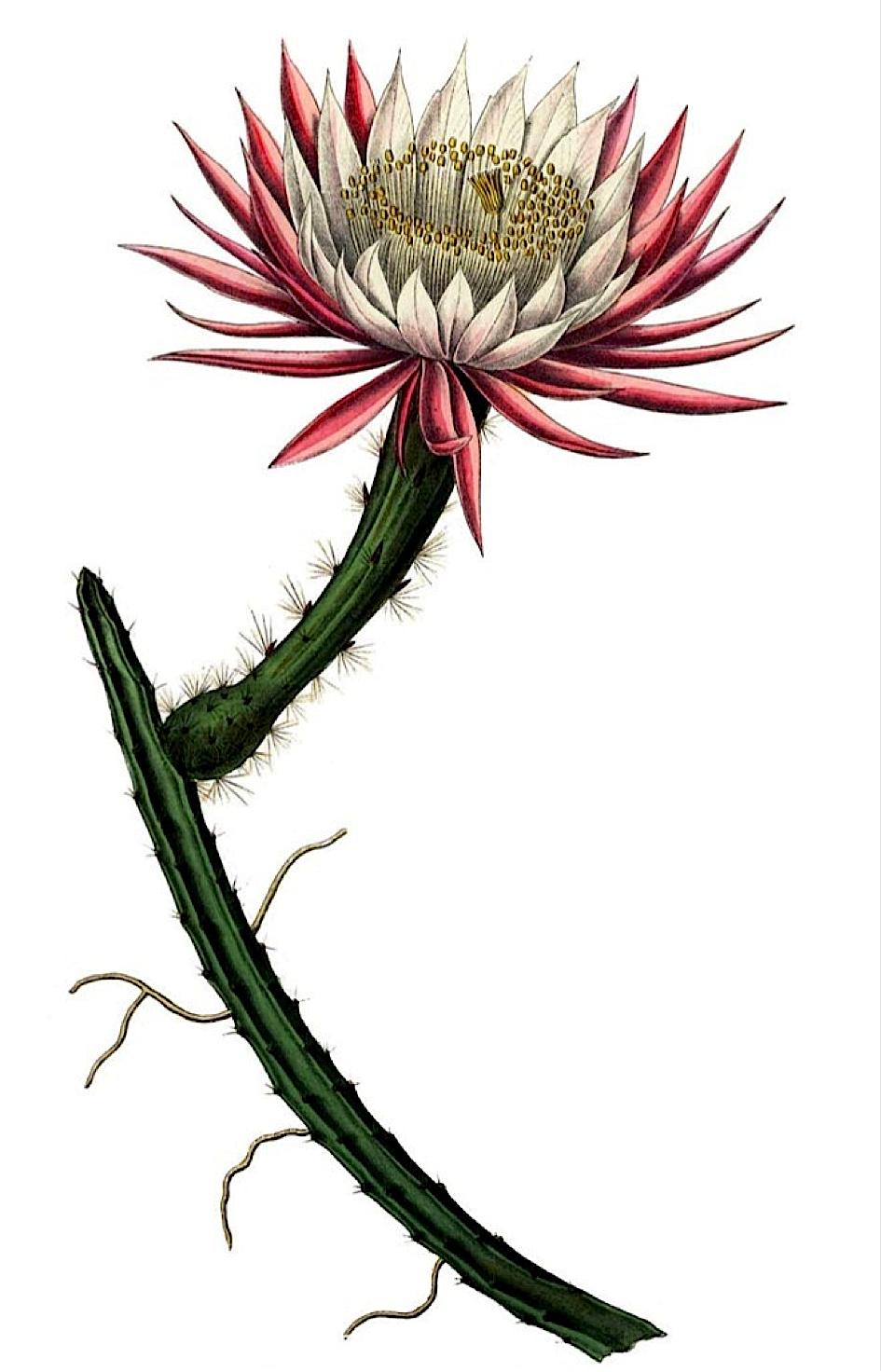

Conservation status
- Least Concern (IUCN 3.1)

Scientific classification
- Kingdom: Plantae
- Clade: Tracheophytes
- Clade: Angiosperms
- Clade: Eudicots
- Order: Caryophyllales
- Family: Cactaceae
- Subfamily: Cactoideae
- Genus: Selenicereus
- Species: S. spinulosus

Binomial name
- Selenicereus spinulosus (DC.) Britton & Rose

Synonyms
- Cereus spinulosus DC. Selenicereus pseudospinulosus Weingart; Selenicereus viridicarpus

= Selenicereus spinulosus =

Species of cactus

Selenicereus spinulosus is a cactus species native to eastern Mexico and, possibly, the lower Rio Grande Valley of Texas in the United States. Common names include vine-like moonlight cactus and spiny moon cereus. Its specific name, spinulosus, means "with small spines" in Latin.

== History ==
This was the third species of Selenicereus to be discovered. It was originally collected by Thomas Coulter in 1827, in Mexico, but no locality is known. Pyramus de Candolle received the plant in Paris and described it without knowing its flowers. He later sent cuttings to Berlin where it flowered the first time in 1842.

== Range and habitat ==
This species is found in eastern Mexico from Tamaulipas to Chiapas. Other sources claim that this species can be found in the states of Texas, Coahuila, Nuevo León and Tamaulipas. Plants were collected from the lower Rio Grande Valley of Texas in the United States, but this population may have been extirpated as it has not been seen outside of cultivation in some time. The specimen is commonly found growing on top of sun-exposed limestone outcrops as well as climbing on other plants in the sierra madre oriental hillsides and submontane matorral (scrub).

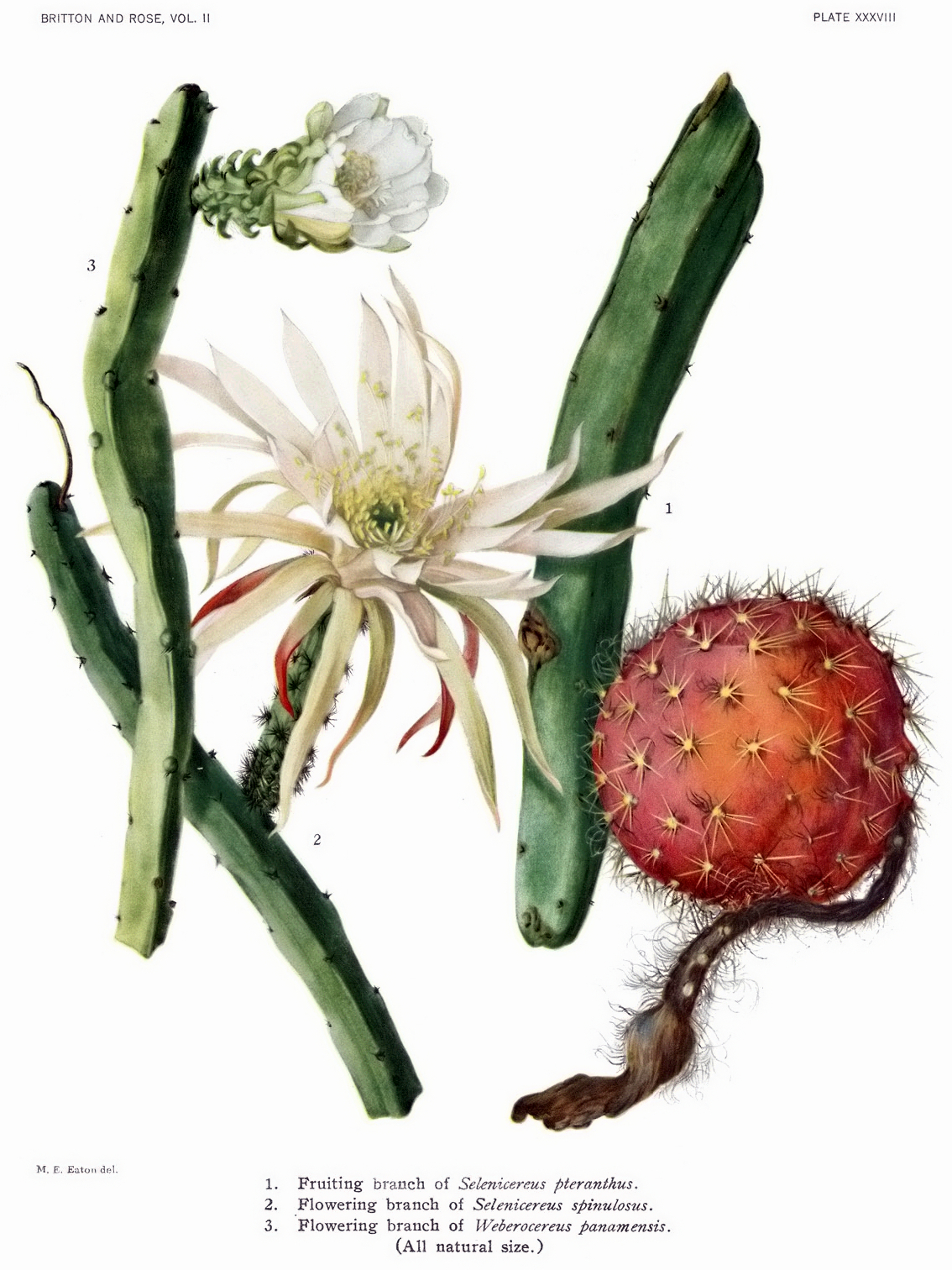

== Systematics ==
Selenicereus spinulosus is a very variable species, especially in flower size, which vary from 7–15 cm long. It is most closely related to Selenicereus atropilosus and Selenicereus vagans.

== Description ==
Stems scandent, clambering or sprawling, branching, producing aerial roots, stiff, to 1-2(-5) m long, 2–3 cm thick; ribs 4–6 or more, later terete, acute; areoles 1,5–2 mm on Ø, reddish brown at first, later greyish brown, internodes 1,5-2,5 cm; spines 6–8, 1 mm long, acicular, white or yellowish, later blackish, radial spines 5–6 central spines 1–2, basally 0,25 mm in Ø above the swollen bases, apically attenuate-conical, circular in cross section, the bulbous bases 0,5 mm in Ø, hairlike spines none; epidermis light green, somewhat shining. Flowers produced from areoles near tip, 8–14 cm long, 7–8,5 cm in Ø, nocturnal but stays open for 2 2–3 days (John Ellis, UK), tepals rotate; pericarpel covered with spines, but no hairs, bracteoles small, triangular, reddish; receptacle ca 5 cm long, green, with clusters of 7–12 spines, 4–5 mm long, brownish, but no hairs; outer tepals 5,5–6 cm, narrowly oblong, acute, brownish; inner tepals 7,5 cm, 11 mm wide, narrowly oblong, acute, white, sometimes with pink base or pinkish throughout; stamens white, much shorter than inner tepals; style yellow, stigma lobes 9–11. Fruit globular, yellow, covered densely with yellowish spines.

== Cultivation ==
Plants ca 1 m long are capable of flowering. Give half-shade or full sun, and grow in a compost containing plenty of peat. During the growing period this plant needs ample water and regular doses of fertilizer. Fast growing and free flowering. Can be kept at 5 °C (41 °F) during winter, if kept dry. It is the easiest species to bring to flower in cultivation.

== Hybrids ==
- 'Pimiento' (Raised by Sherman E. Beahm in 1955) (S. spinulosus × Disocactus 'Tulip') Wide open flower of Capsicum red darkening towards the edges. Medium.
- 'Sacred Ox' (Dr. Robert Poindexter 1943) (S. spinulosus × 'Scarlet Giant') Tepals white with pink and yellow outer tepals.
- 'Twinkle' (Dr. Robert Poindexter) (S. spinulosus × 'Scarlet Giant') Open wide bloom of salmon orange. Very similar to 'Gloria'.
- 'Tululosa' (Beamh 1947) (S. spinulosus × Disocactus 'Tulip'). Straw-orange edged in lavender. Nocturnal.
