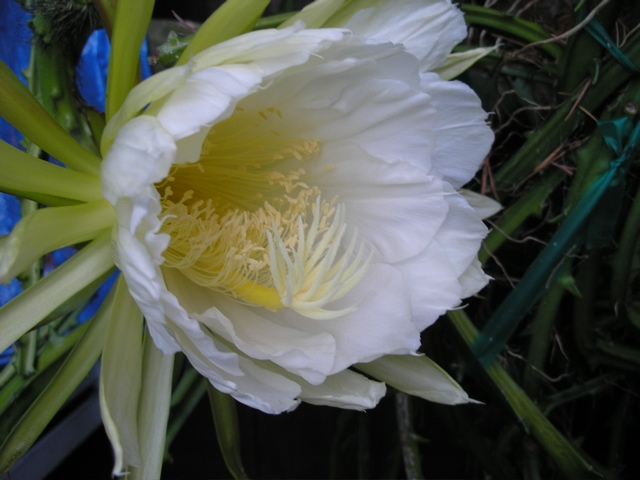
- Photo: Mary Crowell

Scientific classification
- Kingdom: Plantae
- Clade: Tracheophytes
- Clade: Angiosperms
- Clade: Eudicots
- Order: Caryophyllales
- Family: Cactaceae
- Subfamily: Cactoideae
- Genus: Selenicereus
- Species: S. hamatus

Binomial name
- Selenicereus hamatus (Scheidweiler) Britton & Rose

Synonyms
- Cereus hamatus Scheidweiler (1837) Allg. gartenz. 5:371; Cereus rostratus Lemaire (1838) Cact Nov. 29; Selenicereus hamatus (Scheidweiler) Britton & Rose (1909) Contr. U. S. Nat. Herb. 12:430

= Selenicereus hamatus =

Species of cactus

Selenicereus hamatus is a species of Cactaceae and produces one of the largest flowers in the family. It is a cultivated ornamental vine. The species is native to Mexico.

== Etymology ==
Hamatus (Latin) means "hooked", and refers to the curiously hooked stems.

== History ==
Scheidweiler thought that this species originally came from Mexico, which is probably correct. Still, no evidently wild plant has been found. Although it is a quite common species, not much is known about its history.

== Origin and habitat ==
The plant's origin in south and east Mexico. It is only known in cultivation.

== Systematics ==
S. hamatus is a distinct species, distantly related to the grandiflorus-complex. Selenicereus radicans (DC.) A. Berger seems to belong here, but it is impossible to know for sure as the original description is brief and no type seems to exist. The publication of Cereus radicans predates C. hamatus.

== Cultivation ==
This is an easily cultivated, fast growing plant. It needs a compost containing plenty of humus and sufficient moisture in summer. Should not be kept under 10 °C (50 °F) in winter. It can be grown in semi-shade or in full sun. Extra light in the early spring will stimulate budding. Only mature plants produce flowers. It makes an excellent pendent plant.

== Description ==
Stems scandent, clambering or sprawling, branching, producing few aerial roots, very vigorous, to 5–12 m long or more, often growing 2 m or more in a season, 16–22 mm thick; ribs 4 or rarely 3-5, strong, later terete, acute; areoles small, brownish or black, remote, on the upper edges of knubby projections, these often forming obtuse, deflexed spurs about 1 cm long, internodes 4–5 cm; spines 5-6, ca 5 mm long, whitish, bristle like, 1-3 lower or central spines usually brown or black; epidermis glossy grass or light green. Flowers produced one by one over a longer period than most other species, born sparingly near tips of mature stems, 30–40 cm long, 20–30 cm in Ø, nocturnal and strongly scented with an aromatic fragrance, tepals rotate, inner ones forming a broad cup; pericarpel oval, knobby, ca 4 cm thick, covered with white spines and brown or black hairs, bracteoles green with white tips.; receptacle ca 10–14 cm long, green, purplish towards the apex, ca 22 mm in Ø, its areoles with short, retuse, 1–12 mm long bracteoles, long black hairs and spines, upper bracteoles longer, the uppermost tipped purple; outer tepals 15 cm long, in 4 series, the outermost more narrow, reddish purple outside, chrome yellow inside, innermost broader, to 2 cm, acute to acuminate, greenish yellow outside, chrome yellow inside; inner tepals 12 cm, in 3 series, very broad, retuse, mucronate, white; stamens creamy white, anthers yellow; style thick, longer than the stamens, yellowish, lobes 15-18. Fruit oval, 10x8 cm, green or yellow, covered densely with yellowish spines, 2,5 cm long.
