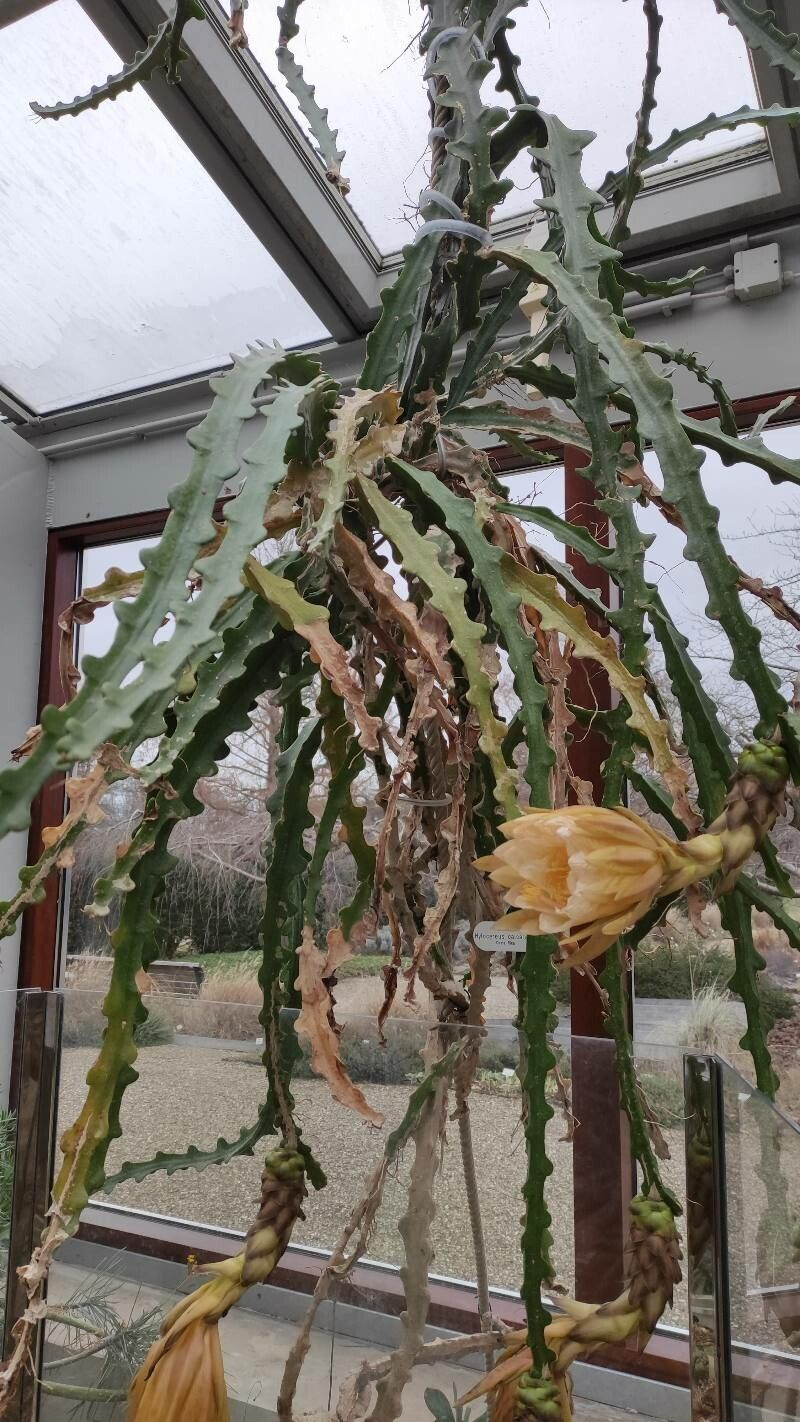

Conservation status
- Endangered (IUCN 3.1)

Scientific classification
- Kingdom: Plantae
- Clade: Tracheophytes
- Clade: Angiosperms
- Clade: Eudicots
- Order: Caryophyllales
- Family: Cactaceae
- Subfamily: Cactoideae
- Genus: Selenicereus
- Species: S. calcaratus

Binomial name
- Selenicereus calcaratus (F.A.C.Weber) D.R.Hunt

Synonyms
- Cereus calcaratus F.A.C.Weber; Hylocereus calcaratus (F.A.C.Weber) Britton & Rose

= Selenicereus calcaratus =

Species of flowering plant

Selenicereus calcaratus is a species of plant in the genus Selenicereus, native to Costa Rica. The species was first described in 1902, and its taxonomic placement has been revised several times, ultimately being placed in the genus Selenicereus in 2017.

== Distribution ==
This species is endemic to Costa Rica. Its range is very restricted, occurring on both slopes of the central Cordillera near the continental divide, in cloud forests at elevations around 1,700 m (5,600 ft) above sea level. An early record from the lowland port of Limón is considered doubtful by modern authors, as all reliably known collections are from high altitudes.

== Morphology ==
The plant is a climbing vine, with stems possessing three thin, prominent wings approximately 4 to 6 cm (1.6 to 2.4 in) wide. The margins of the stems are deeply divided into numerous prominent, undulate lobes. Mature stems are green, while young growth may be slightly glaucous.

The areoles are small and borne on the upper angles of the marginal lobes. The species is notable for having spineless areoles, bearing only 2 to 4 small, white bristles. Britton and Rose noted that this species is "very unlike the other species of Hylocereus, having very peculiar stems and no spines," and suggested that "it may not be of this genus." A complete description of the flower and fruit is still lacking. In The Cactaceae, the authors explicitly stated that neither flowers nor fruits had been observed at the time of writing. Subsequent field records remain scarce, and the floral characteristics await further study.

== Conservation status ==
In the 2013 IUCN Red List assessment, Selenicereus calcaratus was classified as Endangered (EN) under criteria B1ab(iii)+2ab(iii). Its habitat is subject to ongoing decline and degradation due to deforestation, ecotourism development, and occasional landslides during hurricane seasons, contributing to its endangered status. The species is known to occur within at least one protected area, La Amistad National Park, and is maintained in international horticultural collections.
