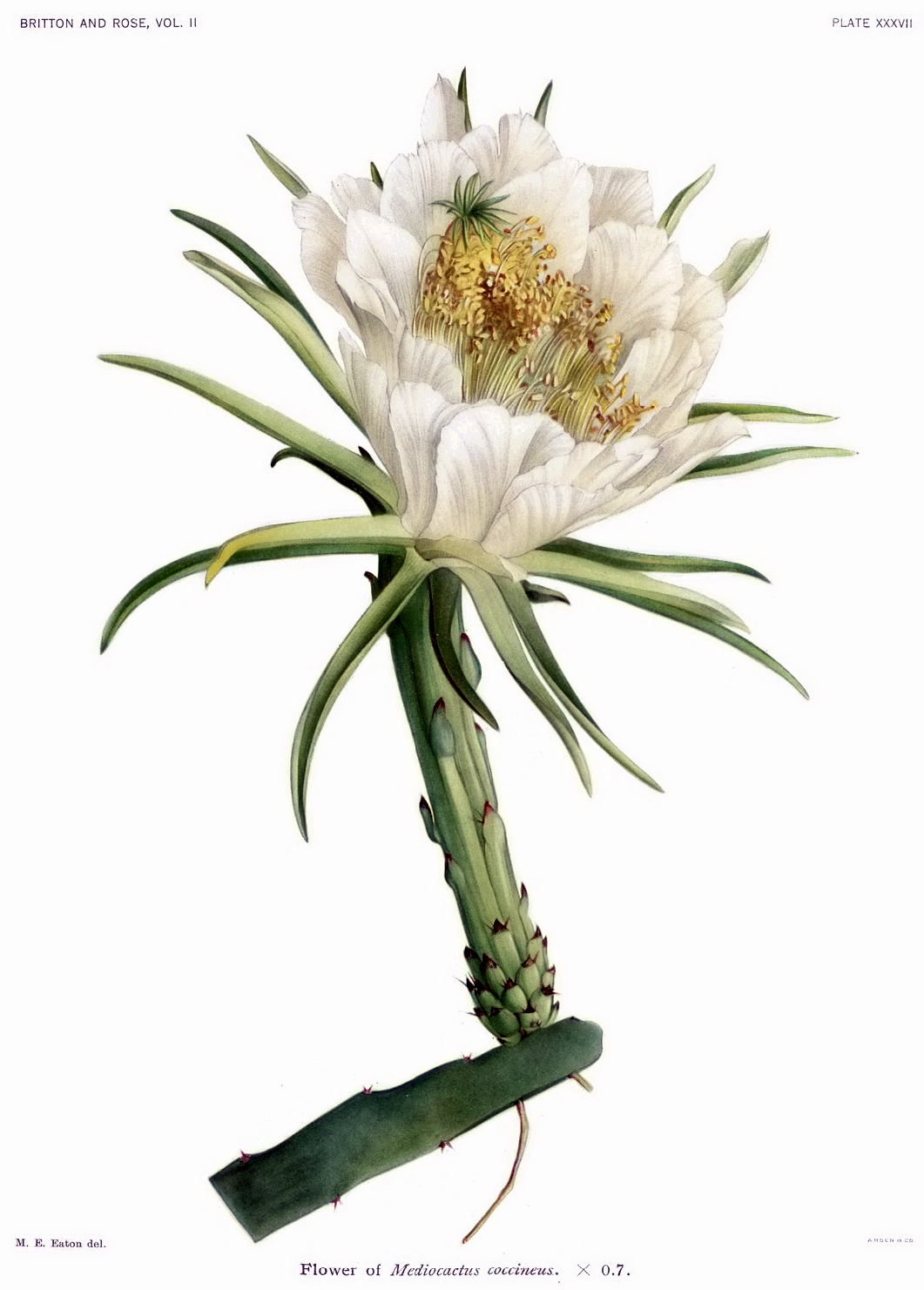

Conservation status
- Least Concern (IUCN 3.1)

Scientific classification
- Kingdom: Plantae
- Clade: Tracheophytes
- Clade: Angiosperms
- Clade: Eudicots
- Order: Caryophyllales
- Family: Cactaceae
- Subfamily: Cactoideae
- Genus: Selenicereus
- Species: S. setaceus

Binomial name
- Selenicereus setaceus (Salm-Dyck ex DC.) A.Berger ex Werderm.

Synonyms
- Cereus bifrons Haw.; Cereus hassleri K.Schum.; Cereus setaceus Salm-Dyck ex DC.; Hylocereus setaceus (Salm-Dyck ex DC.) Ralf Bauer; Mediocactus hassleri (K.Schum.) Backeb.; Mediocactus lindmanii (F.A.C.Weber ex K.Schum.) Backeb.; Mediocactus setaceus (Salm-Dyck ex DC.) Borg; Selenicereus rizzinii Scheinvar

= Selenicereus setaceus =

Species of cactus

Selenicereus setaceus, synonym Hylocereus setaceus, is a species of plant in the family Cactaceae. It is found in Argentina, Bolivia, Brazil, and Paraguay. Its natural habitats are subtropical or tropical dry forests, subtropical or tropical moist lowland forests, rocky shores, and sandy shores. It is not considered threatened by the IUCN.
