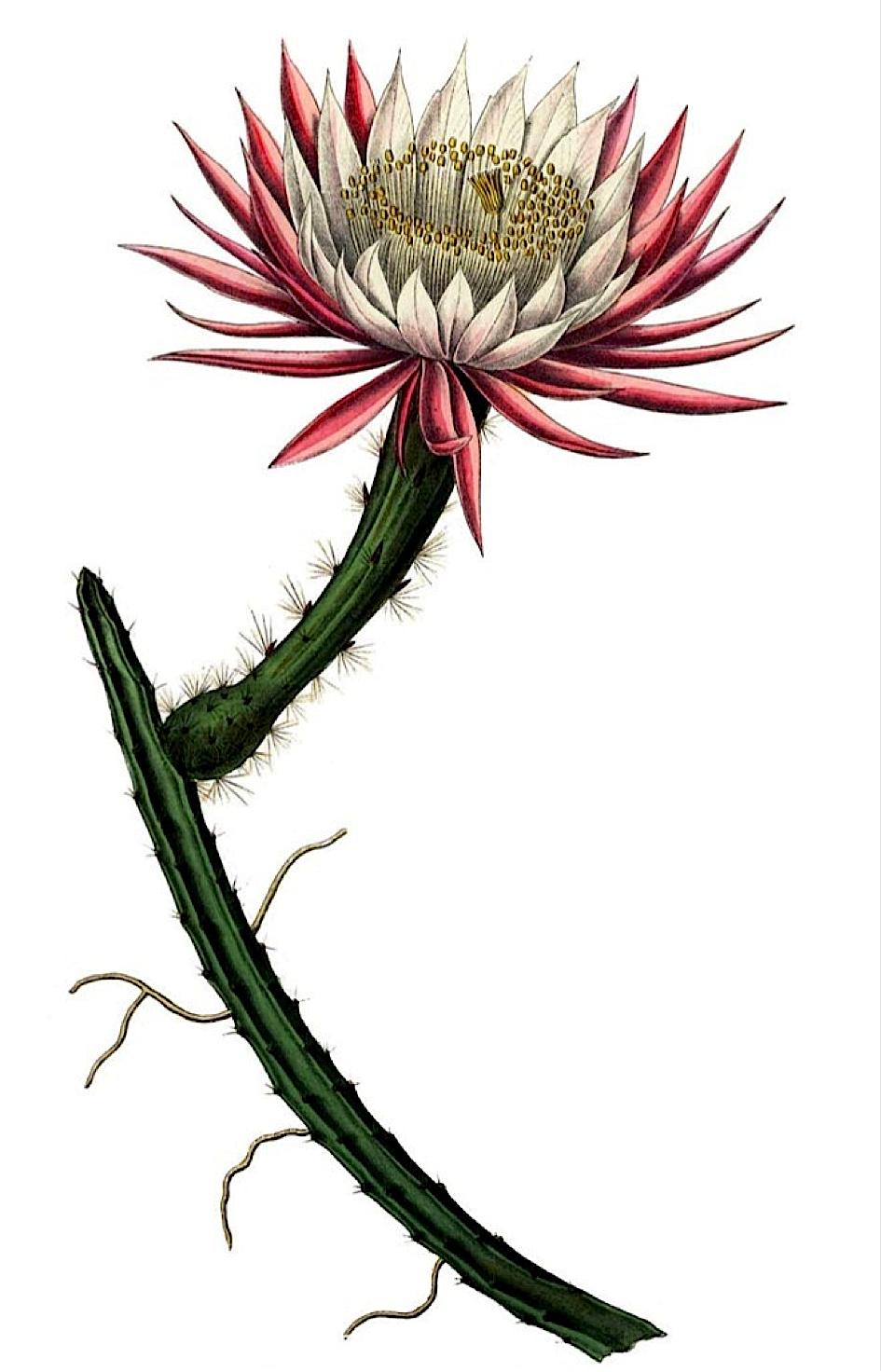
- Selenicereus spinulosus

Scientific classification
- Kingdom: Plantae
- Clade: Tracheophytes
- Clade: Angiosperms
- Clade: Eudicots
- Order: Caryophyllales
- Family: Cactaceae
- Subfamily: Cactoideae
- Tribe: Hylocereeae
- Genus: Selenicereus (A.Berger) Britton & Rose

Species
- See text.

Synonyms
- Chiapasophyllum Doweld; Cryptocereus Alexander; Hylocereus Britton & Rose; Werckleocereus Britton & Rose; Wilmattea Britton & Rose

= Selenicereus =

Genus of cacti

Selenicereus, from Ancient Greek σελήνη (selḗnē), meaning "moon", and Latin cēreus, meaning "candle", sometimes known as moonlight cactus, is a genus of epiphytic, lithophytic, and terrestrial cacti, found in Mexico, Central America, the Caribbean and northern South America. The term night-blooming cereus is also sometimes used, but this is also used for many night-blooming cacti, including Epiphyllum and Peniocereus. In 2017, the genus Hylocereus was brought into synonymy with Selenicereus. A number of species of Selenicereus produce fruit that is eaten. The fruit, known as pitaya or pitahaya in Spanish or as dragon fruit, may be collected from the wild or the plants may be cultivated.

== Description ==
Clambering plants with flat to angled stems, producing aerial roots. Areoles may be with or without spines. Flowers are large and nocturnal, and may be pollinated by moths and bats. The receptacle bears small bracts, hairs and usually spines. Fruits bear numerous spines. Flowers are generally produced in abundance with mature plants and are typically white and are very fragrant and only last a single night in most species.

== Taxonomy ==
The taxon was first described as a section, Cereus sect. Selinicereus, by Alwin Berger in 1905. It was raised to a genus by Britton and Rose in 1909. The name is derived from Σελήνη (Selene), the Greek moon goddess, referring to the nocturnal flowers, and cereus, meaning "candle" in Latin, a name used for upright cacti. A molecular phylogenetic study of the tribe Hylocereeae in 2017 showed that the genus Hylocereus was nested within Selenicereus, so all the species of Hylocereus were transferred to Selenicereus. As of March 2021, the transfer was accepted by Plants of the World Online. The authors of the 2017 study also placed some species of Weberocereus within Selenicereus, which was not accepted by Plants of the World Online as of March 2021.

=== Phylogeny ===
The cladogram below shows the relationships found in the 2017 study of the tribe Hylocereeae.

- Hylocereeae
  - Acanthocereus
  - Aporocactus
  - - hylocereoid clade
      - Selenicereus (including Hylocereus and 3 former Weberocereus species)
      - Weberocereus (remaining species)
    - phyllocactoid clade
      - Pseudorhipsalis
      - - Kimnachia
        - Epiphyllum
        - Disocactus

Selenicereus belongs to the hylocereoid clade, along with Weberocereus. Members of the clade are mostly climbing or epiphytic, and have spiny ribbed stems, contrasting with members of the phyllocactoid clade, which are mainly epiphytic, and have spineless flattened leaf-like stems.

=== Species ===
Species placed in the genus by Korotkova et al. in 2017 are listed below. The list includes three species formerly placed in Weberocereus, whose transfer was not accepted by Plants of the World Online as of May 2025.

Species	Description	Distribution	Flower	Fruit
Selenicereus anthonyanus (Alexander) D.R.Hunt	Stems like those of Epiphyllum anguliger but more vining and with short spines. Flowers ca. 12 cm long, 10–15 cm wide, the outer inner tepals purplish, the inner cream.	Mexico.		
Selenicereus atropilosus Kimnach	Flowers 12 cm long, receptacle with black hairs. The species is close to some species in the genus Weberocereus.	Mexico.		
Selenicereus calcaratus (F.A.C.Weber) D.R.Hunt		Costa Rica		
Selenicereus costaricensis (F.A.C.Weber) S. Arias & Korotkova	Stems waxy-white without horny margins. Flowers ca. 30 cm long with large bracts, usually with purple margins. Fruit red with purple pulp.	Costa Rica, Nicaragua and Panama.		
Selenicereus dorschianus Ralf Bauer		Mexico		
Selenicereus escuintlensis (Kimnach) D.R.Hunt	Stems green not glaucous, brown-margined. Flowers 28–31 cm long, 24–36 cm wide.	Guatemala, Mexico and Nicaragua		
Selenicereus extensus (Salm-Dyck ex DC.) Leuenb.		French Guiana, Guyana and Suriname		
Selenicereus grandiflorus (L.) Britton & Rose	Stems many-ribbed. Flowers 18 cm long, receptacle densely woolly. Three subspecies are recognized: ssp. grandiflorus; ssp. donkelaarii - Mexico. Stems 1 cm thick, low-ribbed, spines short, appressed to stem. Flowers 18 cm long.; ssp. hondurensis- Honduras? Stem ribs tubercled. Flowers 30–34 cm long.	The Bahamas, the Cayman Islands, Cuba, the Dominican Republic, Guatemala, Haiti, Jamaica, Mexico and Nicaragua.		
Selenicereus guatemalensis (Eichlam ex Weing.) D.R.Hunt		Guatemala		
Selenicereus hamatus (Scheidw.) Britton & Rose	Stems 3-4-ribbed, with knobby projections, nearly spineless. Flowers 20–25 cm long, receptacle with black hairs.	Mexico.		
Selenicereus inermis (Otto) Britton & Rose	Stems 2-5-ribbed, almost spineless. Flower 15 cm long, spiny, hairless.	Colombia, Costa Rica, Mexico, Panamá and Venezuela.		
Selenicereus megalanthus (K.Schum. ex Vaupel) Moran	Stems green, slender without horny margins. Flowers 30–38 cm long with large flattened tubercles and small bracts. Fruit yellow.	Colombia, Ecuador and Peru		
Selenicereus minutiflorus (Britton & Rose) D.R.Hunt	Stems green. Flowers with rigid spines at base of flower, 5 cm long, 8–9 cm wide, white.	Belize, Guatemala and Honduras		
Selenicereus monacanthus (Lem.) D.R.Hunt (syn. incl. H. lemairei, H. monacanthus)	Stems gray-green without horny margins. Flowers ca 30 cm long, petals white, tinged pinkish near base or entirely pink. Tube with distant bracts. Stigma lobes usually forked. Fruit red with purple pulp.	Colombia, Costa Rica, Ecuador, Nicaragua, Panamá, Peru, Trinidad and Tobago, Venezuela and the Venezuelan Antilles		
Selenicereus murrillii Britton & Rose	Stems only 8 mm thick, nearly spineless. Flowers 15 cm long, spiny, hairless. Closely related to S. spinulous and S. inermis (sensu lat.).	Mexico.		
Selenicereus nelsonii (Weing.) Britton & Rose	Flowers 20 cm long, receptacle hairless, spiny. Possibly conspecific with S. vagans.	Mexico.		
Selenicereus ocamponis (Salm-Dyck) D.R.Hunt(syn. incl. H. guatemalense, H. purpusii, H. ocamponis)	Stems white-waxy, margins horny, spines needle-like, to 12 mm long. Flowers 25–32 cm long with white inner petals. Bracts overlapping, with purple margins.	Mexico		
Selenicereus plumieri (Rol.-Goss.) Hoxey & Gdaniec		Windward Islands		
Selenicereus pteranthus (Link ex A.Dietr.) Britton & Rose	Two forms are recognized: f. macdonaldiae - Honduras? Stem ribs tubercled. Flowers 30–34 cm long.; f. pteranthus - Mexico. Stems thick, 4-5-ribbed, spines very short. Flowers 25–30 cm long.	The Bahamas, Belize, the Cayman Islands, Cuba, the Dominican Republic and Mexico.		
Selenicereus purpusii (Weing.) Arias & Korotkova		Mexico		
Selenicereus setaceus (Salm-Dyck ex DC.) A.Berger ex Werderm.	Stems green without horny margins, rather spiny. Flowers 19–22 cm with small tubercles and bracts. Fruit red.	Argentina, Bolivia, Brazil and Paraguay		
Selenicereus spinulosus (DC.) Britton & Rose		Texas, Mexico. Stems short-spined. Flowers 8–14 cm long, receptacle spiny, hairless.		
Selenicereus stenopterus (F.A.C.Weber) D.R.Hunt	Stems thin, soft, green. Flowers 9–10 cm long, 13–15 cm wide, tube short, tepals purplish red.	Costa Rica		
Selenicereus tonduzii (F.A.C.Weber) S. Arias & Korotkova (syn. Weberocereus tonduzii)		Costa Rica and Panama		
Selenicereus triangularis (L.) D.R.Hunt	Stems green without horny margins, slender. Flowers ca. 20 cm long, base with wide overlapping scales	Cuba, the Dominican Republic, Haiti, the Leeward Islands, Puerto Rico and the Windward Islands		
Selenicereus tricae D.R.Hunt		Belize, Guatemala and Mexico		
Selenicereus undatus (Haw.) D.R.Hunt	Stems green, margins undulate and horny. Flowers 25–30 cm long, white with green outer tepals and bracts. Fruit red with white pulp.	El Salvador, Guatemala, Honduras and Mexico		
Selenicereus vagans (K.Brandegee) Britton & Rose	Flower 15 cm long, receptacle spiny, hairless.	Mexico.		
Selenicereus validus S.Arias & U.Guzmán	Huge nocturnal flowers with bright red fruits.	Mexico (Michoacán).		
Selenicereus wercklei(F.A.C.Weber) Britton & Rose		Costa Rica		

Species formerly recognized include:

- Selenicereus boeckmannii – synonym of Selenicereus pteranthus
- Selenicereus brevispinus – synonym of Selenicereus pteranthus
- Selenicereus chontalensis – synonym of Deamia chontalensis
- Selenicereus coniflorus – synonym of Selenicereus grandiflorus
- Selenicereus hallensis – synonym of Selenicereus grandiflorus
- Selenicereus urbanianus – synonym of Selenicereus grandiflorus
- Selenicereus rubineus – synonym of Selenicereus inermis
- Selenicereus wercklei – synonym of Selenicereus inermis
- Selenicereus wittii – synonym of Strophocactus wittii

== Uses ==
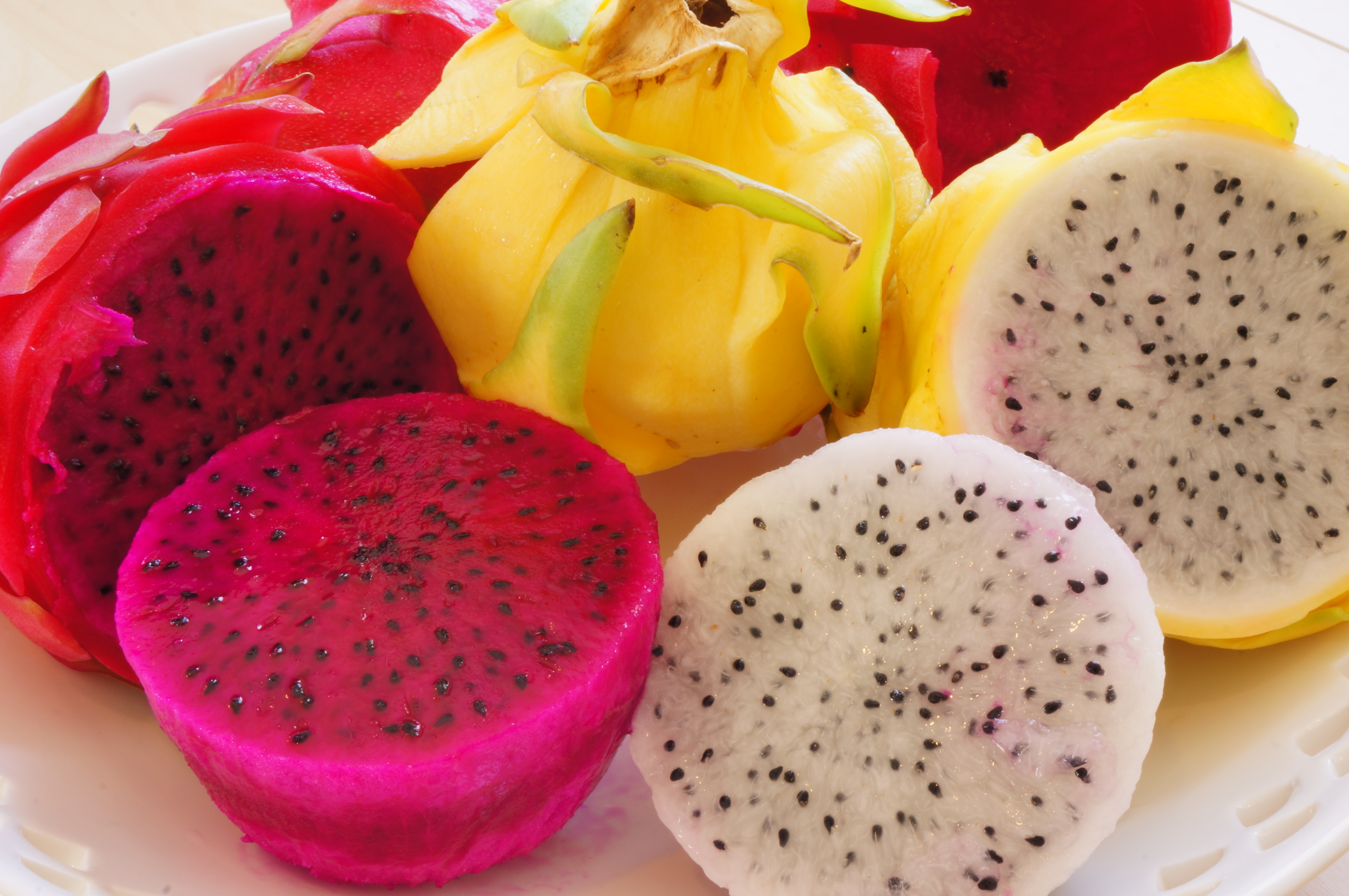
Pitayas of various colours

The fruits of a number of species of Selenicereus (particularly those formerly placed in Hylocereus) are eaten. Selenicereus undatus and Selenicereus triangularis are widely cultivated in the Americas, Europe and Asia for their fruits, known as pitayas or pitahayas in Spanish, and as dragon fruits in Asia. The fruit of Selenicereus setaceus is eaten in South America.
