= Dragon fruit =

Fruit of several cactus species

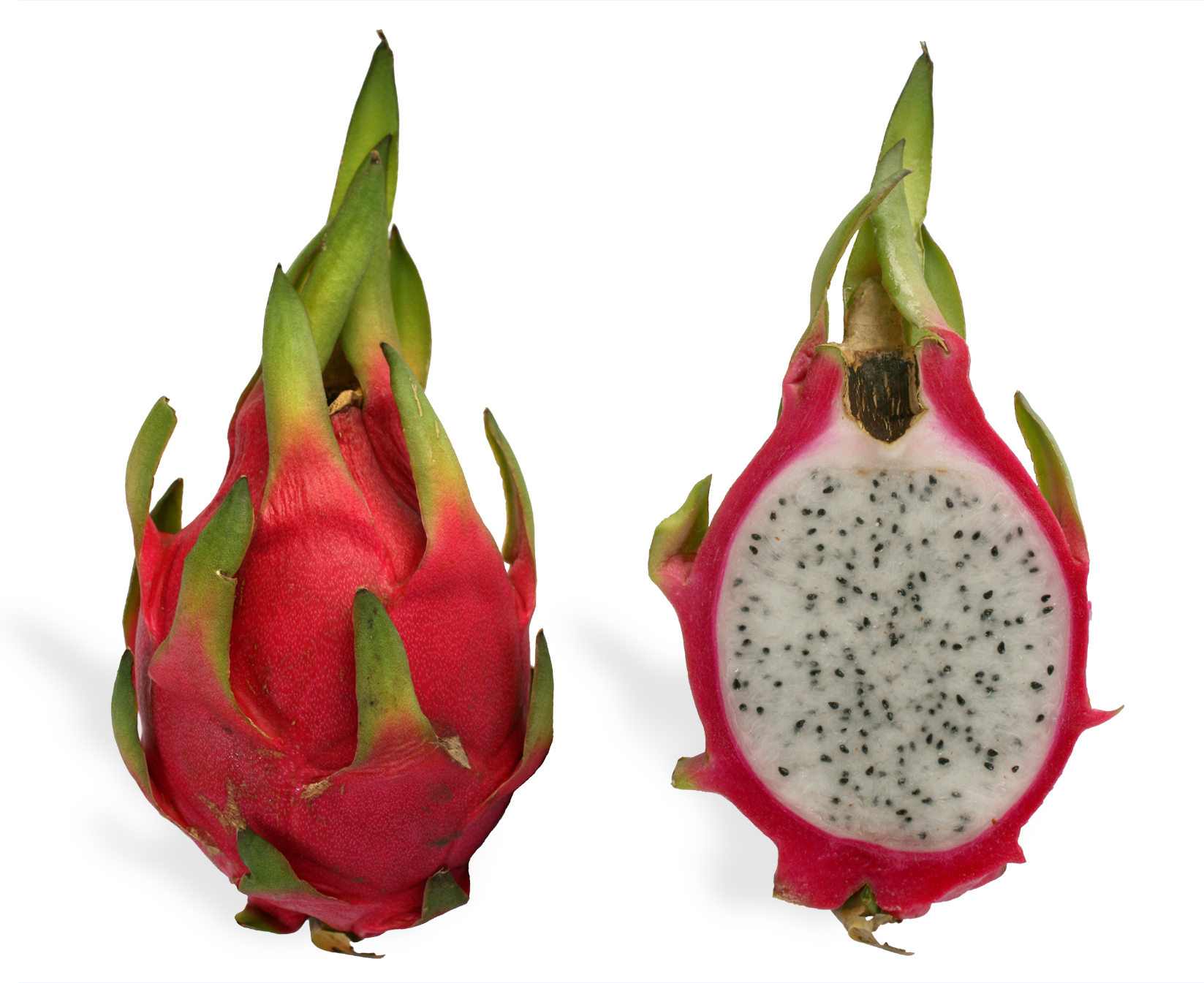
Cross section of a pink dragon fruit.

Dragon fruit, also called pitahaya or pitaya, is the fruit of several species in the cactus genus Selenicereus, particularly Selenicereus undatus, native to the southern regions of Mexico and the Pacific coast of Guatemala, Costa Rica, and El Salvador. By the turn of the 21st century, its cultivation has expanded to other regions including China, Colombia, and most of Southeast Asia.

== Description ==
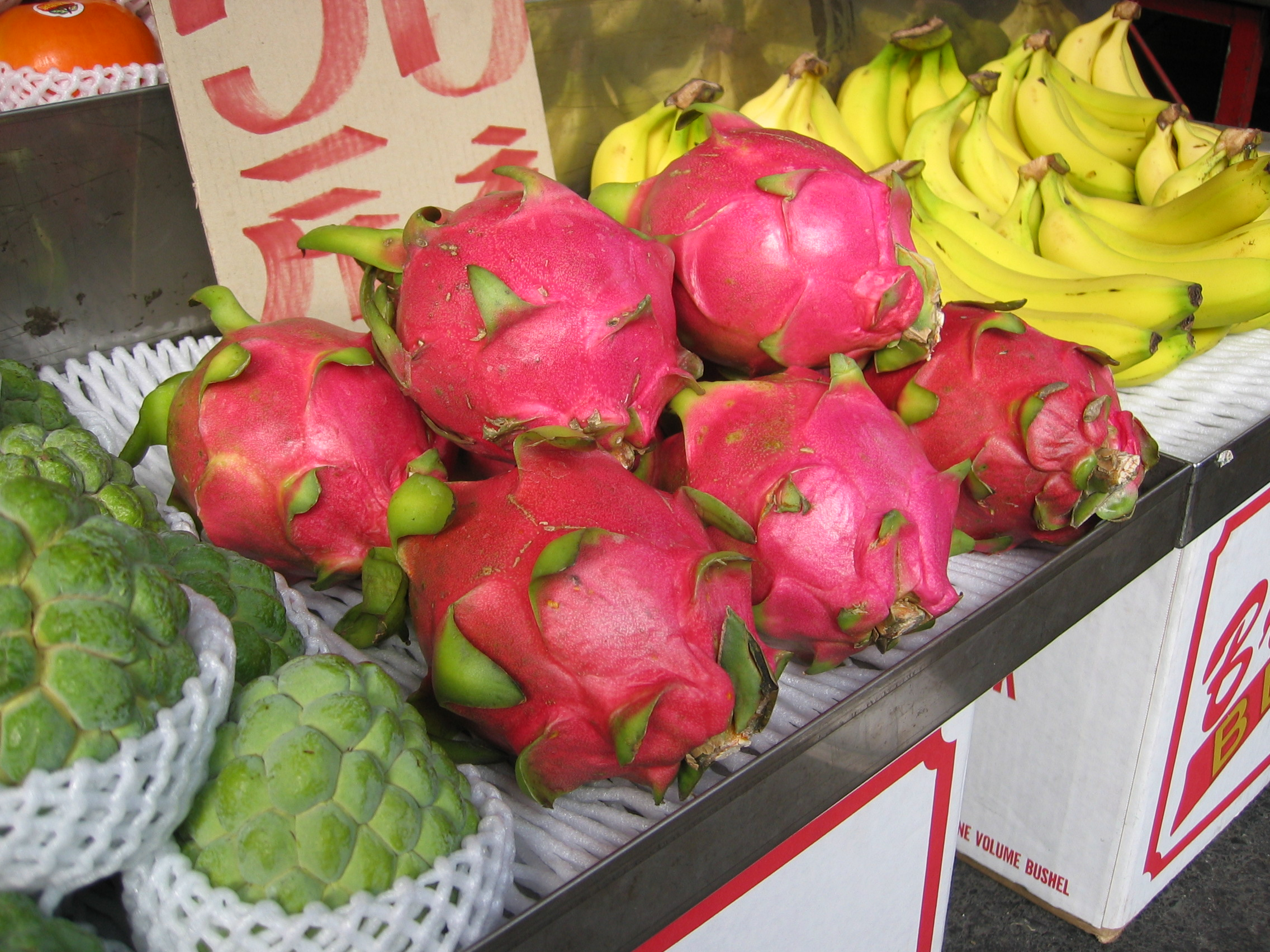
Dragon fruit (Selenicereus undatus) in a Taiwanese market

The dragon fruit is a hardy and succulent cactus, as it is drought resistant, possessing long triangular stems. It often intertwines itself with nearby trees, taking moisture from their bark and climbs 8 to 10 metres (26 to 33 ft) from the ground without penetrating the ground. The flower of the dragon fruit is tubular and bisexual.

It only opens once in the night and its aroma attracts insects. It is self-pollinating, but it can also pollinate with other plants, with bats as a natural pollinator. The formation of the fruit from pollination to harvest takes 4 to 8 weeks depending on the temperatures.

The fruit is oval-shaped, 10 by 6 centimetres (3.9 by 2.4 in). Before ripening, the pulp is green, turning yellow or red depending on the cultivar. The pulp has small black seeds. The skin is coated with bright-red, fleshy or yellow, ovate scales. The red and purple colors of some Selenicereus fruits are due to betacyanins, a family of pigments that includes betanin, the same substance that gives beets, Swiss chard and amaranth their red color.

== Species ==
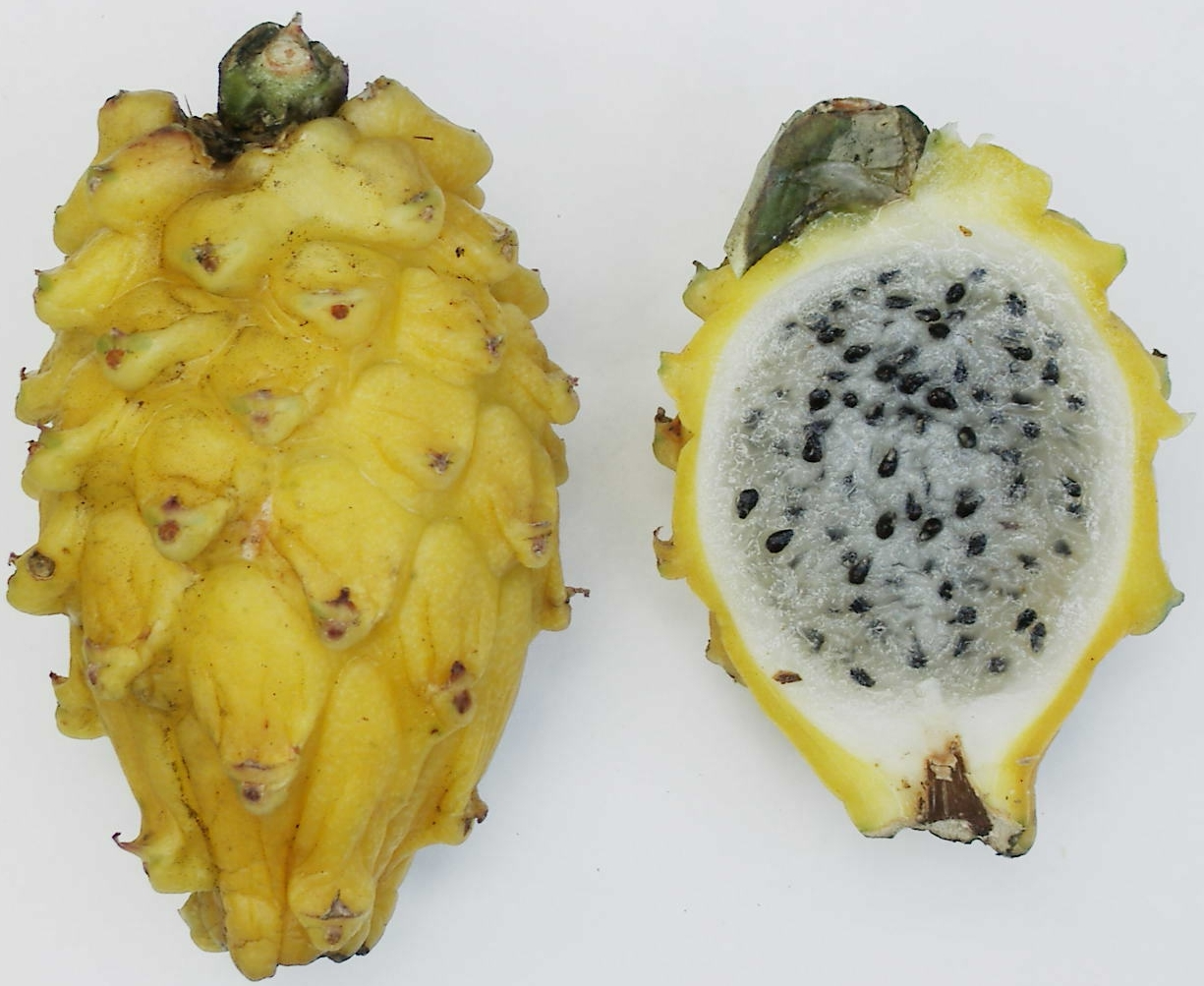
Fruit of Selenicereus megalanthus

Dragon fruits mainly come in three types:

- Selenicereus undatus has pink-skinned fruit with white flesh. This is the most commonly seen "dragon fruit". It is also known as the following: night blooming cereus, strawberry pear, pitahaya roja, reina de la noche (queen of the night), formerly Hylocereus undatus.
- Selenicereus costaricensis has red-skinned fruit with red flesh. It is also known as Costa Rica nightblooming cactus, Costa Rican pitaya, Hylocereus costaricensis and Hylocereus polyrhizus.
- Selenicereus megalanthus has yellow-skinned fruit with white flesh. S. megalanthus is commonly known as "yellow dragon fruit", "yellow pitahaya", "kirin fruit" or "yellow pitaya". It is also formerly known as Hylocereus megalanthus.

The fruit weighs around 150 to 600 grams (5 1/2 to 21 oz); some may reach 1 kg (2 lb 3 oz). Early imports from Colombia to Australia were designated Hylocereus ocampensis (or Cereus repandus, the red fruit) and Cereus triangularis (supposedly, the yellow fruit or the three-sided cross-section of the stem).

== Cultivation ==
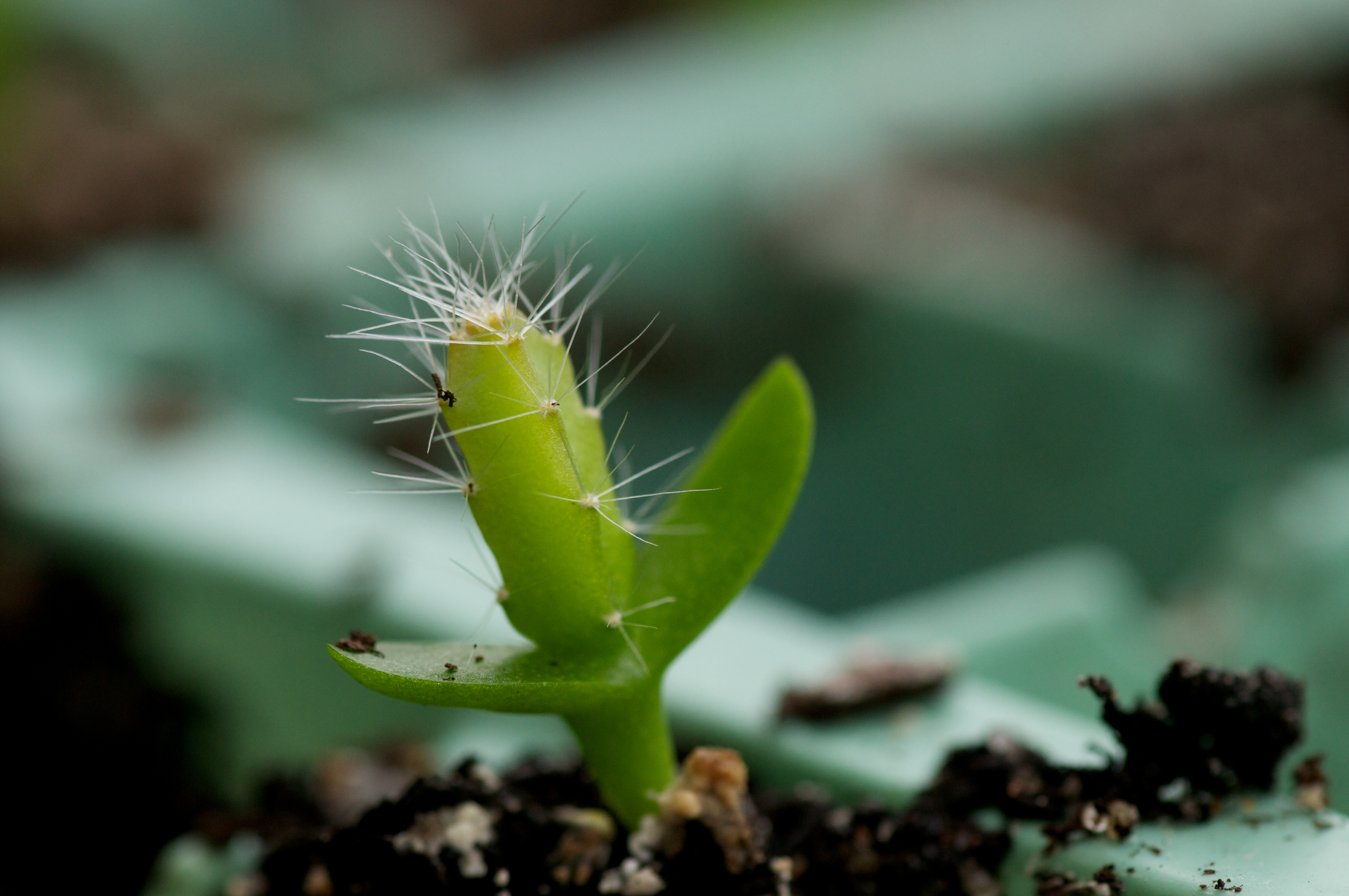
Seedling

After a cleaning of the seeds from the pulp of the dragon fruit, the seeds are stored when dried as the ideal fruit is unblemished and overripe.

The seeds grow in a compost or potting soil mix, including pots indoors. The cacti germinate after between 11 and 14 days after shallow planting. As they grow, the plants will find something to climb on, normally involving aerial roots down from the branches, usually in addition to basal roots. Once the plant reaches 4.5 kilograms (10 pounds) in weight, the plant may flower.

Commercial plantings can be done at a density between 1,100 and 1,350 per hectare (445 and 546/acre). Plants can take up to 60 months (260 weeks) to come into full commercial production, at which stage yields of 20 to 30 metric tons (22 to 33 short tons) can be expected.

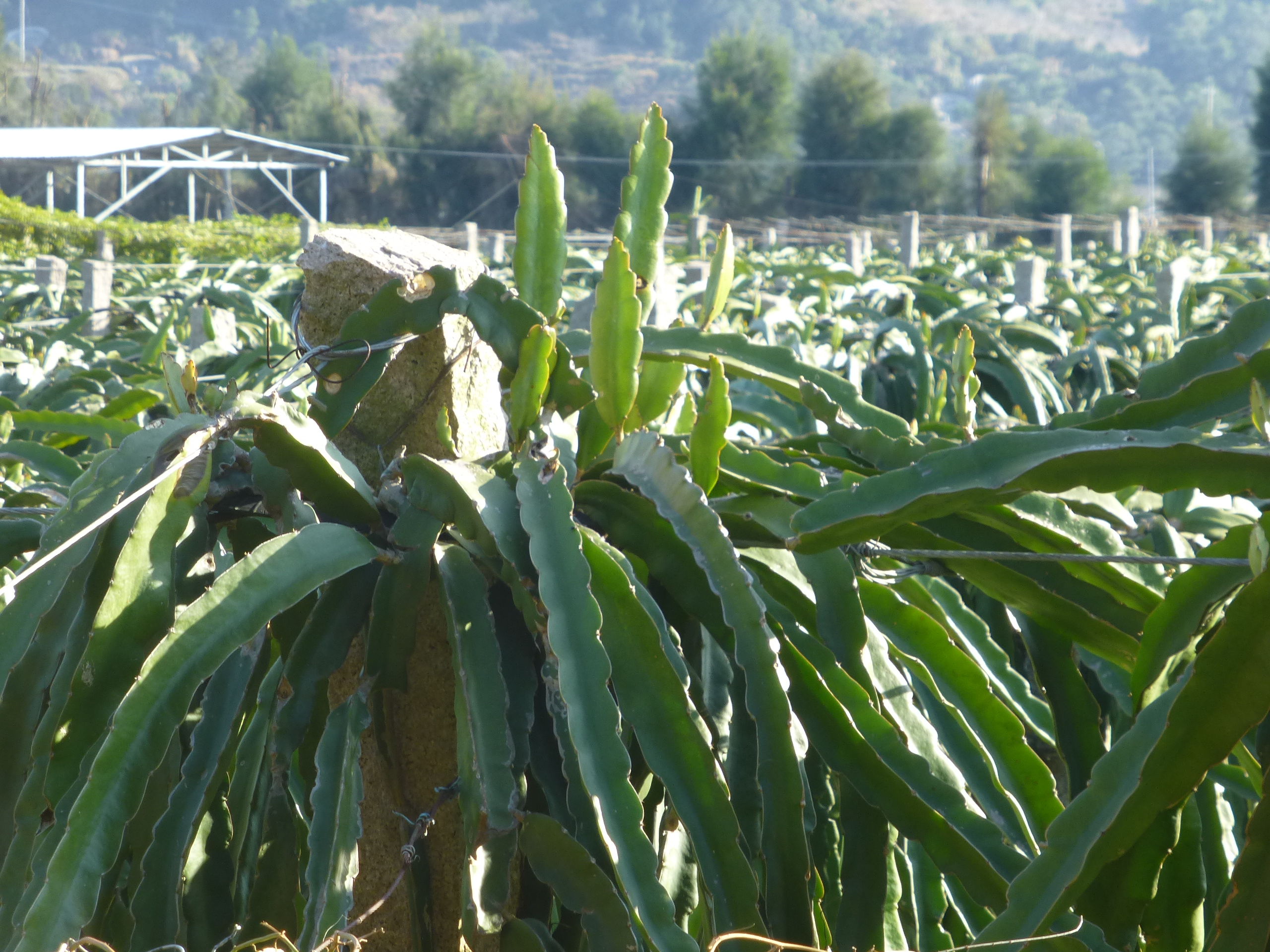
Dragon fruit farm in China

Dragon fruit flowers bloom overnight and usually wilt by the evening. They rely on nocturnal pollinators such as bats or moths for fertilization. Self-fertilization will not produce fruit in some species and while crossbreeding has resulted in several "self-fertile" varieties, cross-pollinating with a second, genetically distinct plant of the same species generally increases fruit set and quality. This limits the capability of home growers to produce the fruit. However, the plants can flower between three and six times per year depending on growing conditions. Like other cacti, if a healthy piece of the stem is broken off, it may take root in the soil and become its own plant.

The plants can endure temperatures up to 40 °C (104 °F) and short periods of frost but will not survive long exposure to freezing temperatures. The cacti thrive most in USDA zones 10–11 but may survive outdoors in zone 9a or 9b.

Selenicereus has adapted to live in dry tropical climates with a moderate amount of rain. In numerous regions, it has escaped cultivation to become a weed and is classified as an invasive weed in some countries.

Substantial dragon fruit culitvation occurs in Vietnam, China, Mexico, Colombia, several countries of Southeastern Asia, and Australia. Nicaragua produces Selenicereus sp. while Colombia grows Selenicereus megalanthus, and Vietnam produces Selenicereus undatus.

=== Pests and diseases ===
Stems and fruits are susceptible to several diseases caused by fungi, bacteria, nematodes and viruses. Overwatering or excessive rainfall can cause the flowers to drop, and fruit to rot, such as the bacterium Xanthomonas campestris that causes the stems to rot. Dothiorella fungi can also cause brown spots on the fruit, and other fungi known to infect the fruit include Botryosphaeria dothidea, Colletotrichum gloeosporioides and Bipolaris cactivora.

Dragon fruit, raw
Nutritional value per 100 g (3.5 oz)
- Energy: 57 kcal (240 kJ)
- Carbohydrates: 15.2 g
- Sugars: 9.75 g
- Dietary fiber: 3.1 g
- Fat: 0.14 g
- Protein: 0.36 g
Vitamins and minerals
Vitamins	Quantity %DV^{†}
Thiamine (B1)	1% 0.012 mg
Riboflavin (B2)	2% 0.026 mg
Niacin (B3)	1% 0.161 mg
Vitamin B6	2% 0.026 mg
Folate (B9)	2% 7 μg
Choline	1% 5.1 mg
Vitamin C	5% 4.3 mg
Vitamin E	1% 0.12 mg
Vitamin K	4% 4.4 μg
Minerals	Quantity %DV^{†}
Calcium	1% 9 mg
Iron	1% 0.18 mg
Magnesium	2% 7 mg
Phosphorus	1% 12 mg
Potassium	4% 116 mg
Sodium	0% 1 mg
Zinc	1% 0.1 mg
- Other constituents: Quantity
- Water: 84 g
- Link to entry in FoodData Central, USDA Database
- ^{†}Percentages estimated using US recommendations for adults, except for potassium, which is estimated based on expert recommendation from the National Academies.

== Nutrition ==
Raw dragon fruit is 84% water, 15% carbohydrates, and contains negligible protein and fat (table). In a reference amount of 100 grams (3.5 oz), dragon fruit provides 57 kilocalories (240 kilojoules) of food energy, with no micronutrients in significant content (table).

== Culinary ==
When halved, a raw dragon fruit can be eaten with a spoon. Its juice can be used to flavor and color beverages, pastries, or candy. The flowers can be eaten as a vegetable or steeped as a tea.

=== Seed oils ===
The fatty acid compositions of the seed oils in Selenicereus costaricensis, syn. Hylocereus costaricensis (red-fleshed pitaya) and Selenicereus undatus, syn. Hylocereus undatus (white-fleshed pitaya) are similar, and include palmitic acid, stearic acid, palmitoleic acid, and mainly oleic acid (22%) and linoleic acid (50%).

== Gallery ==
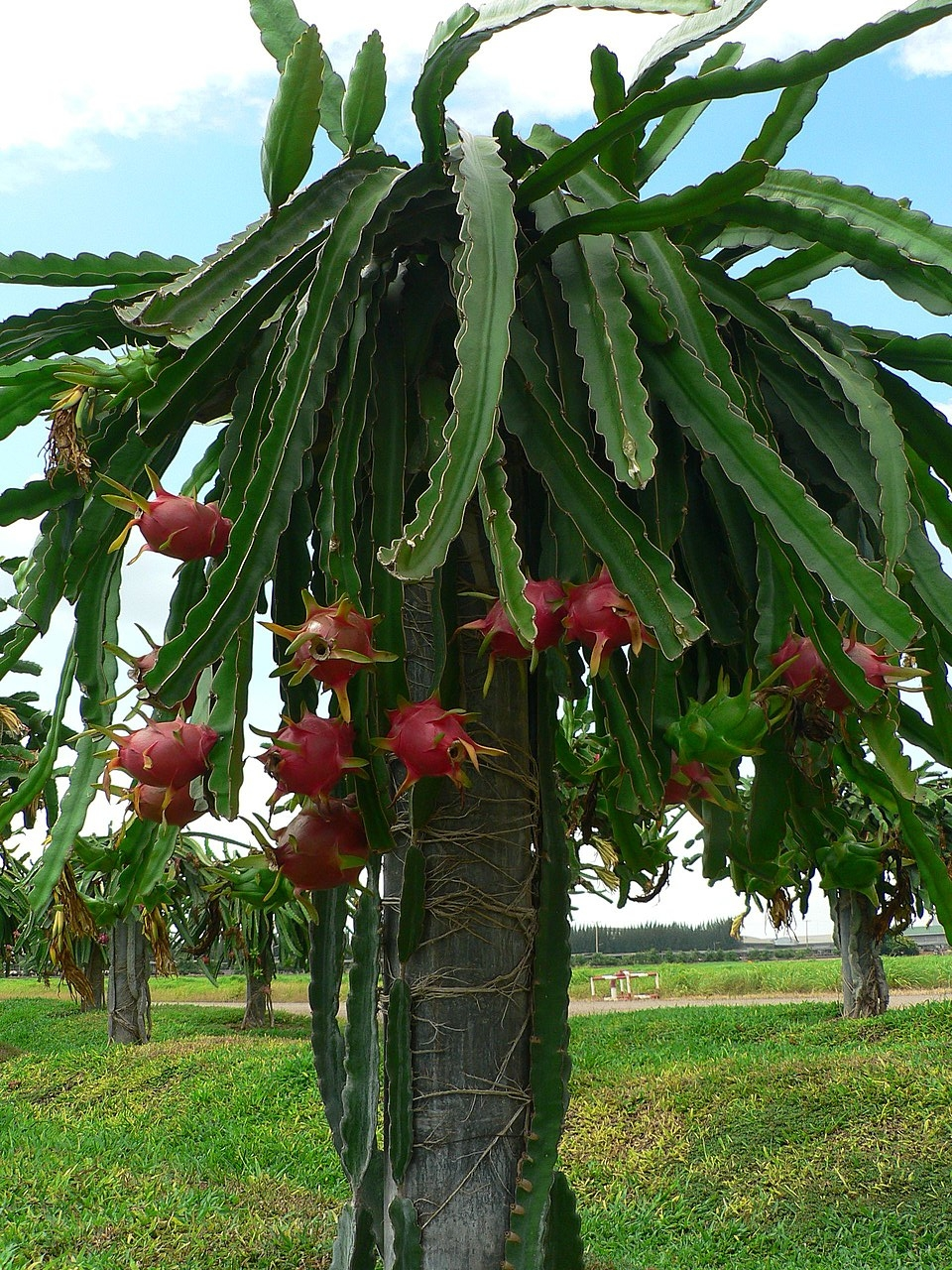
Dragon fruit "tree"

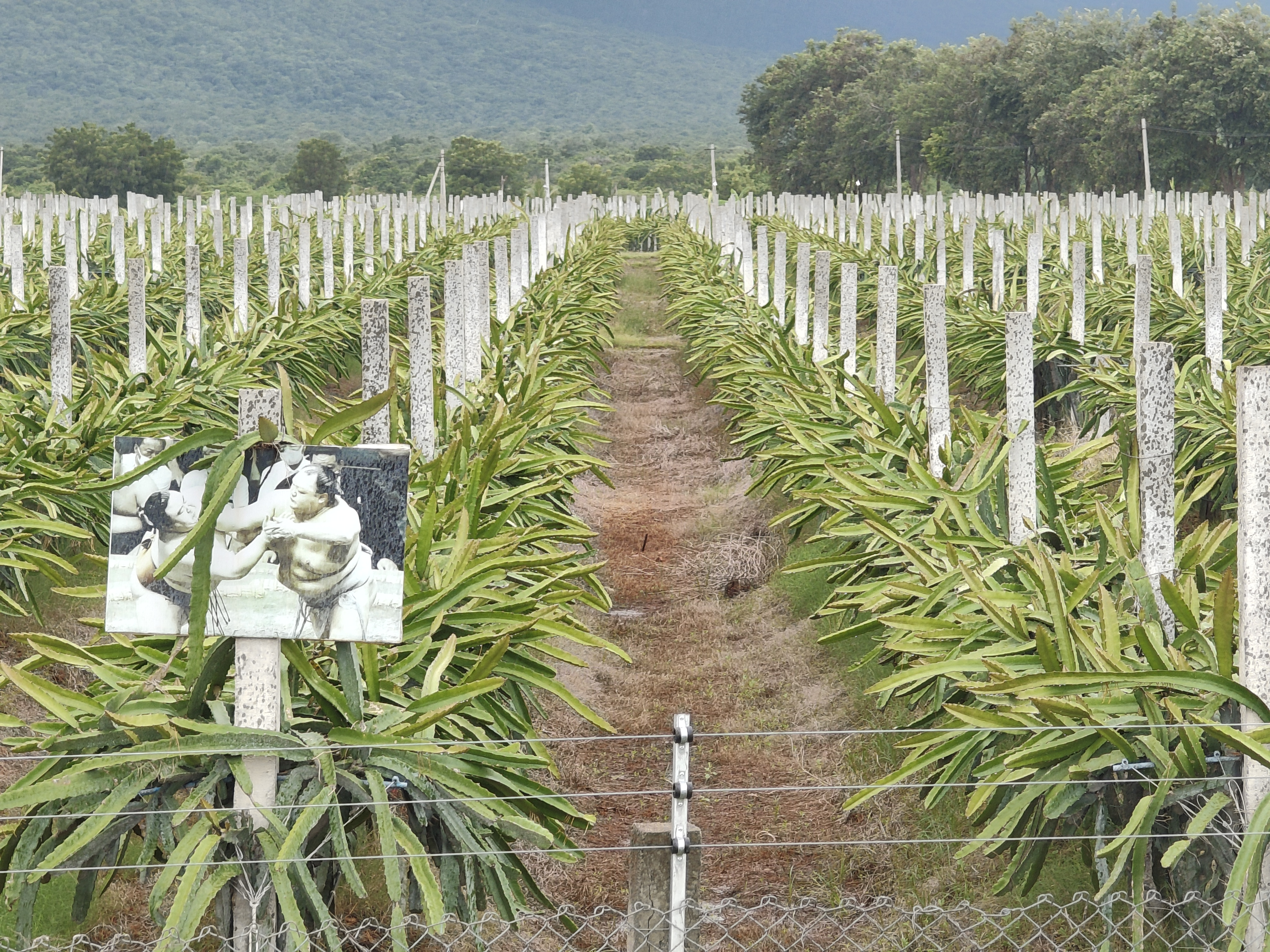
Dragonfruit farm, India

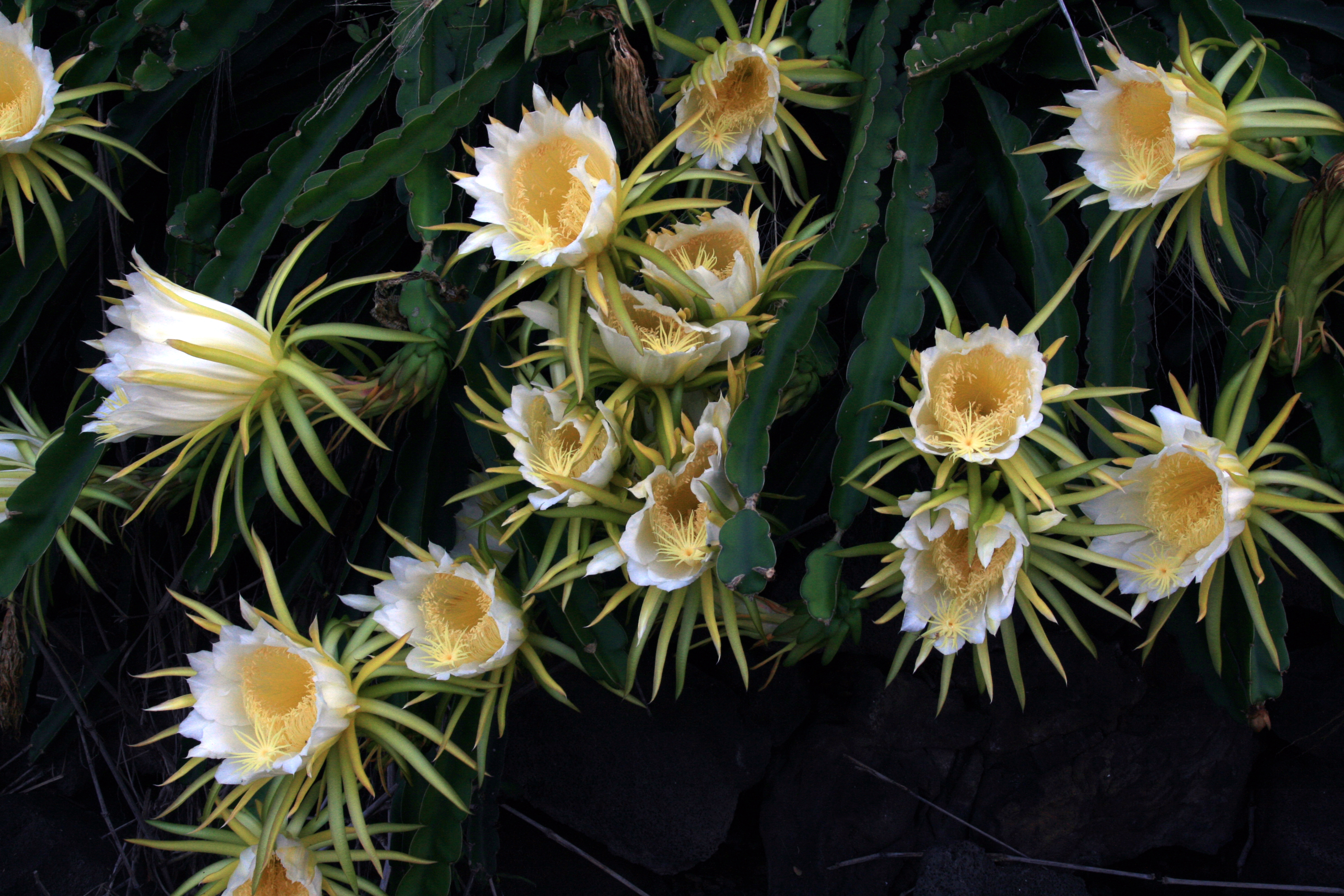
Nocturnal flowering

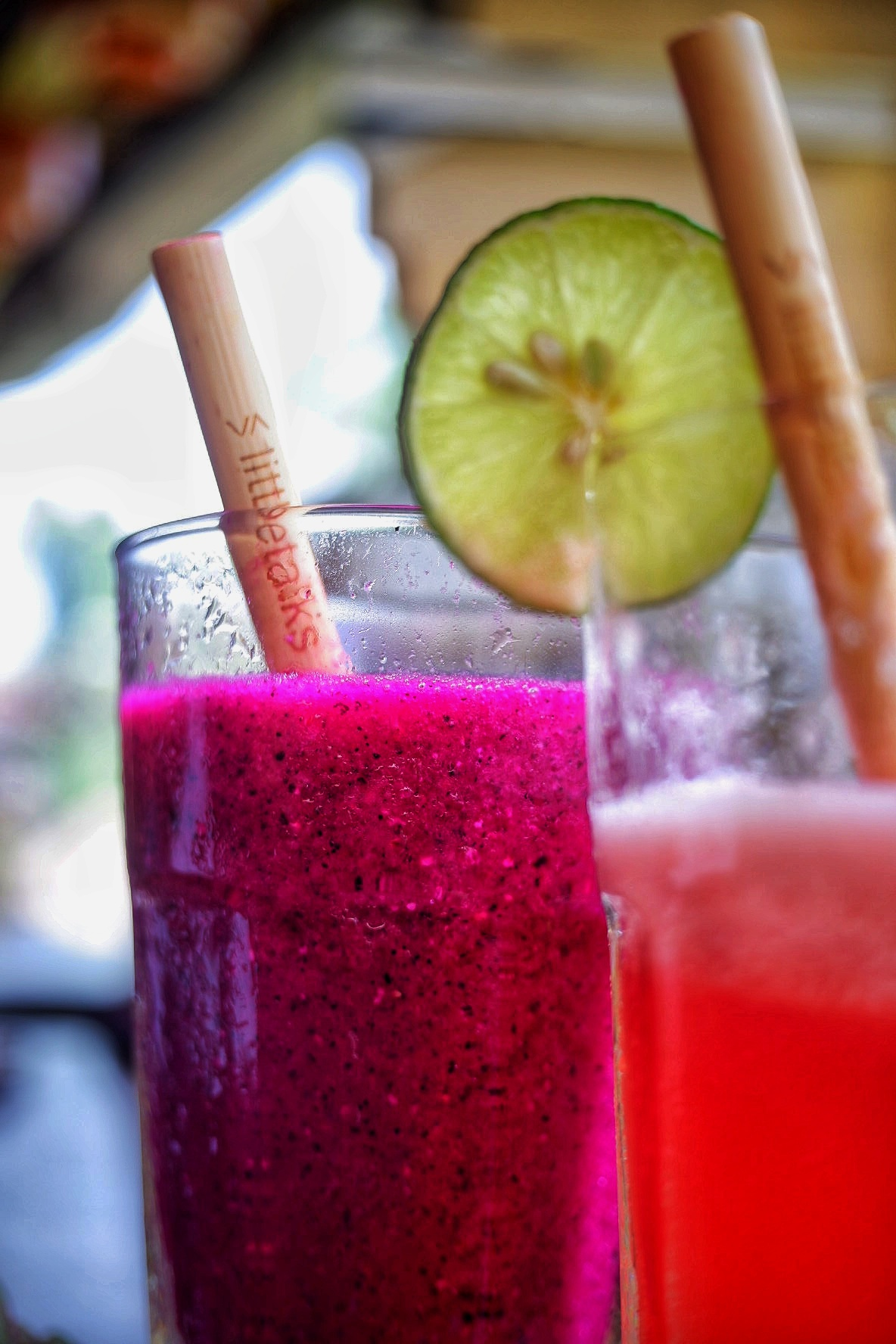
Jus buah naga, purple dragon fruit juice, Indonesia

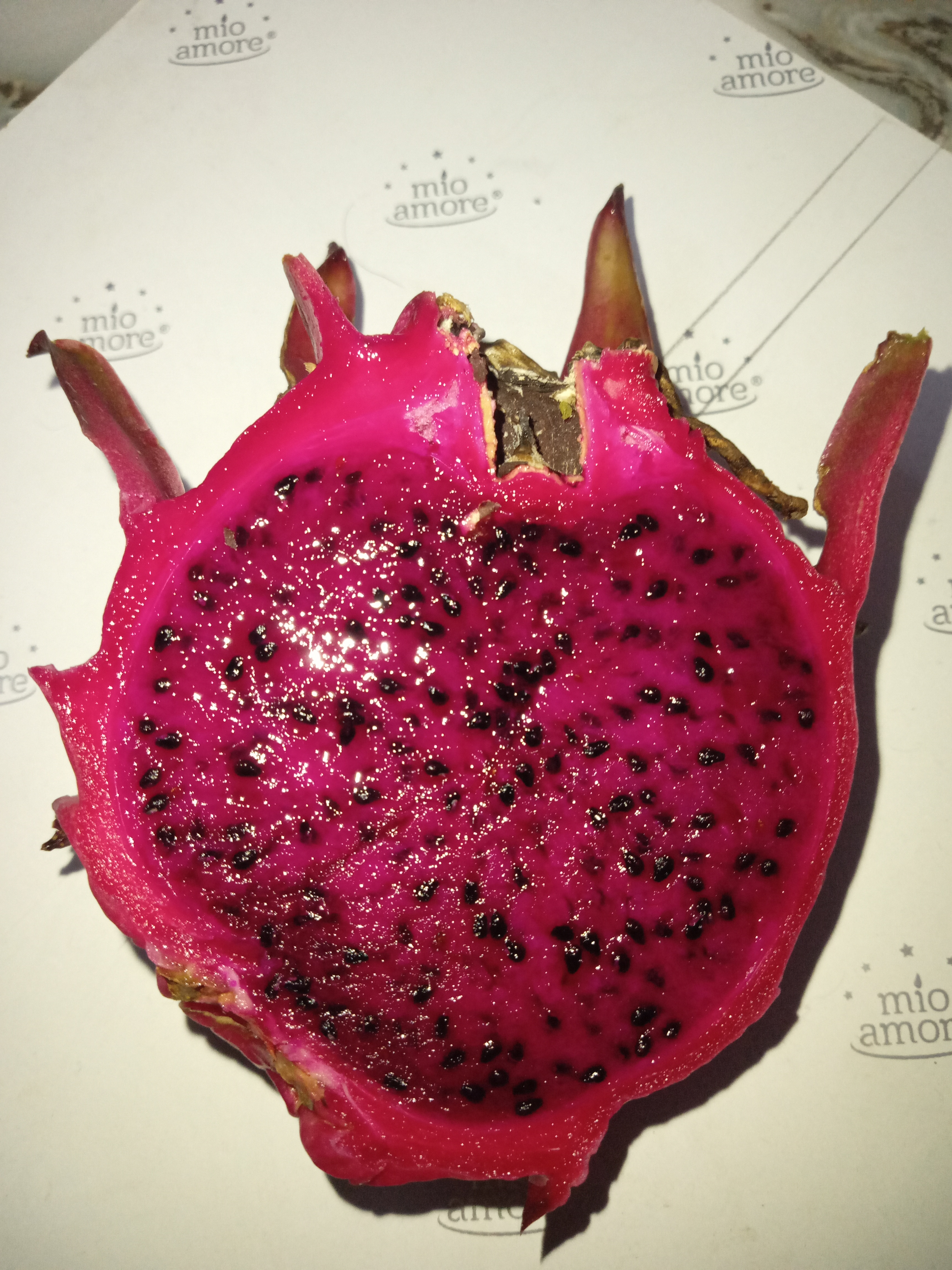
Dissected dragon fruit

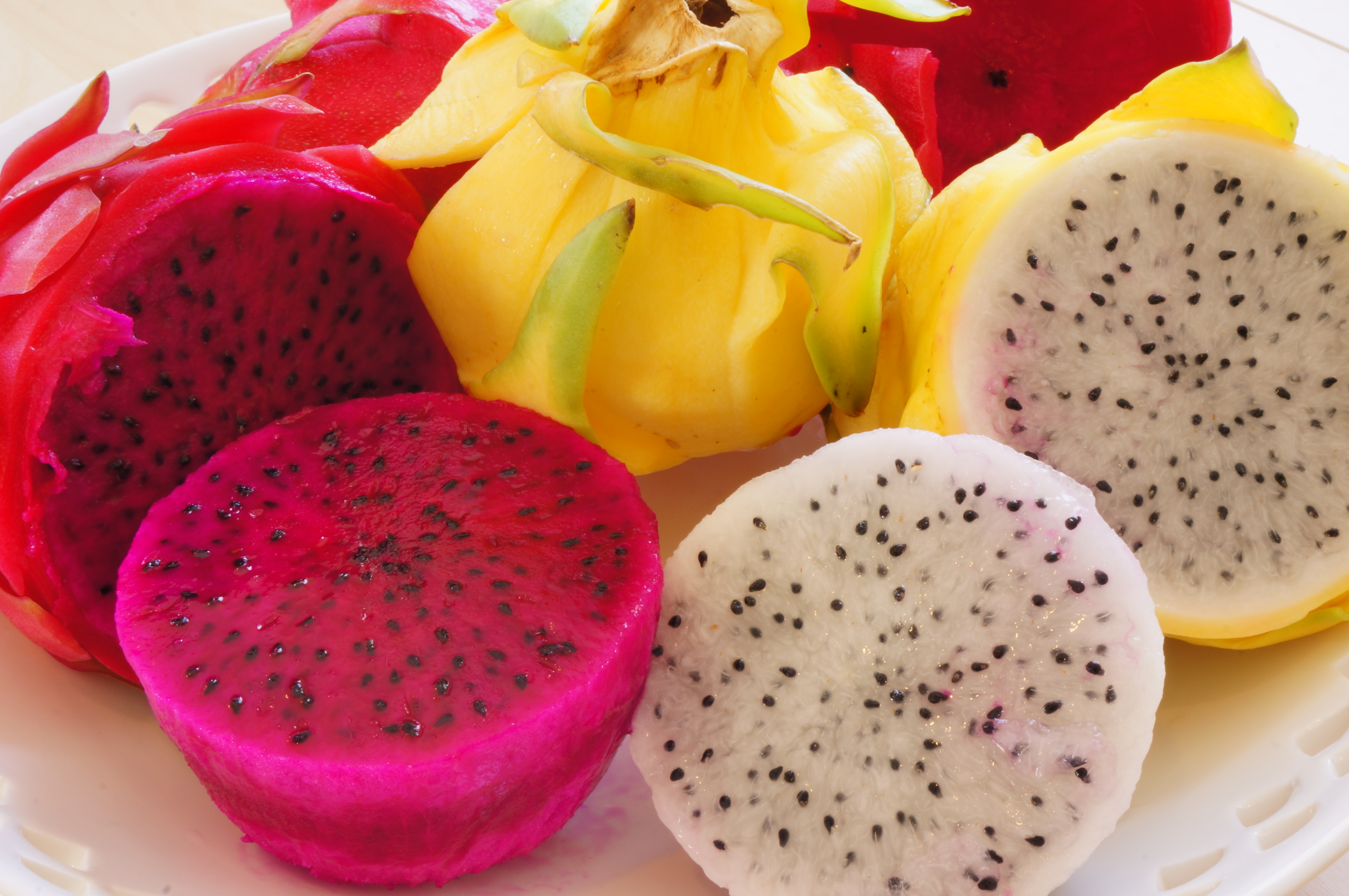
Red, yellow and white fruits

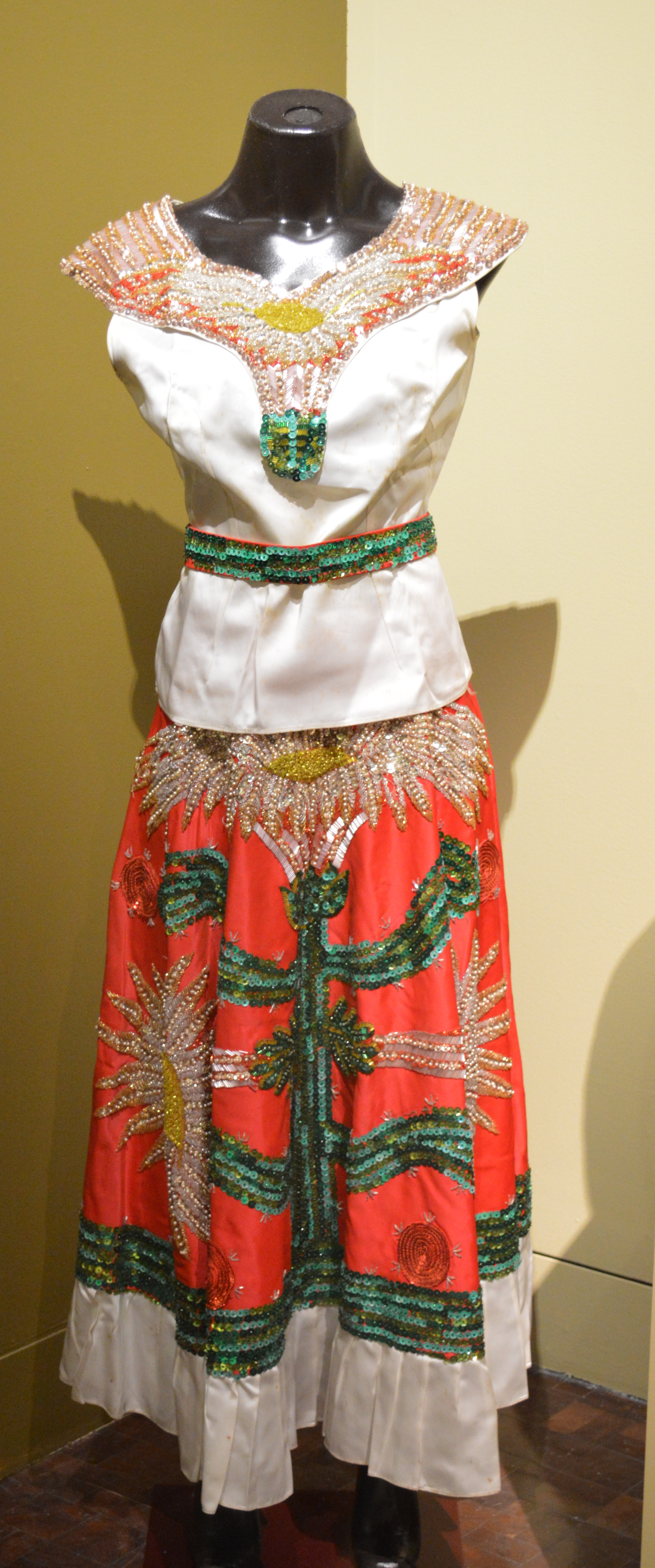
Dress for a folk dance called Flor de Pitahaya ("Pitahaya Flower"), Museo de Arte Popular, Mexico City
