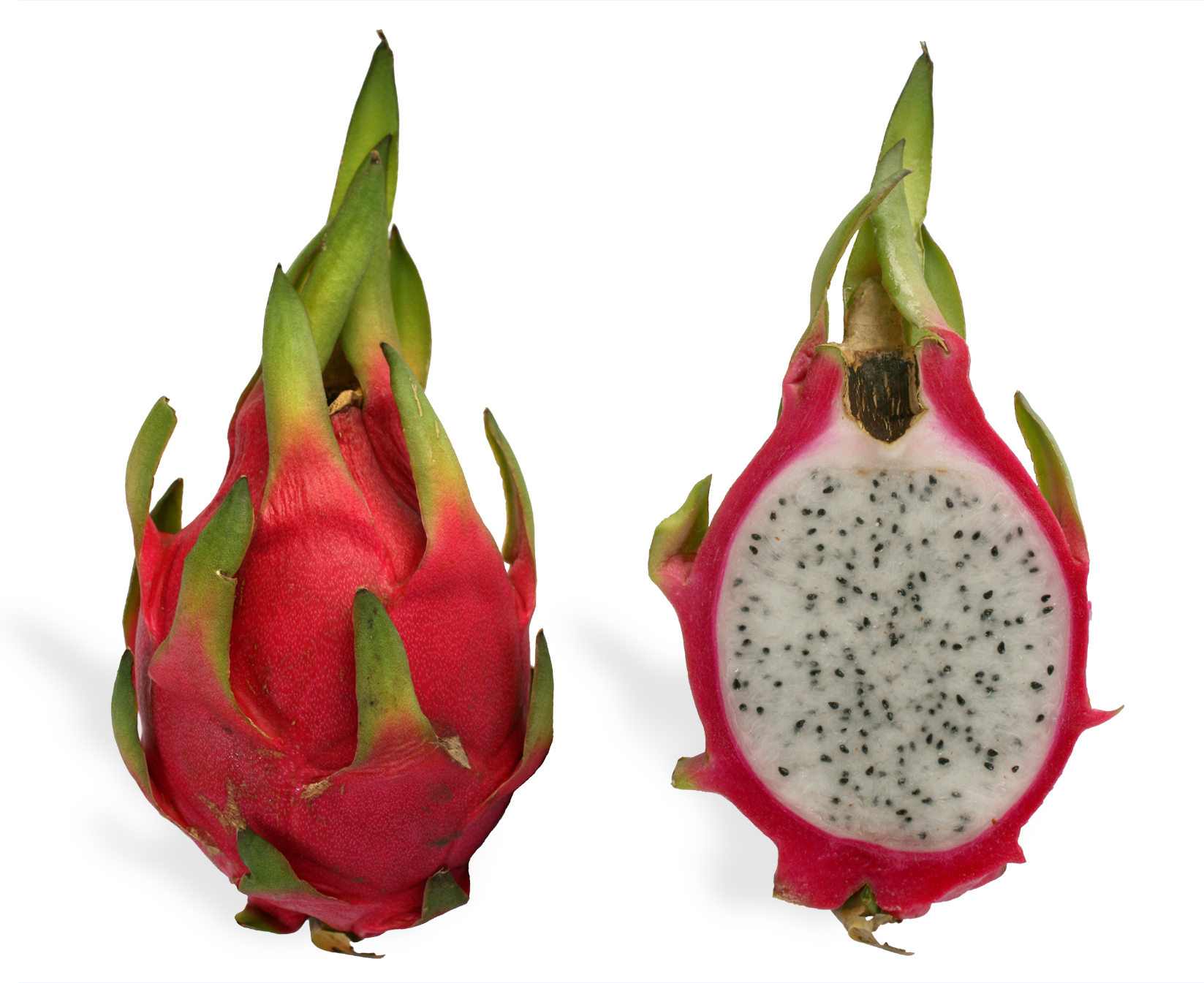
- Fruit
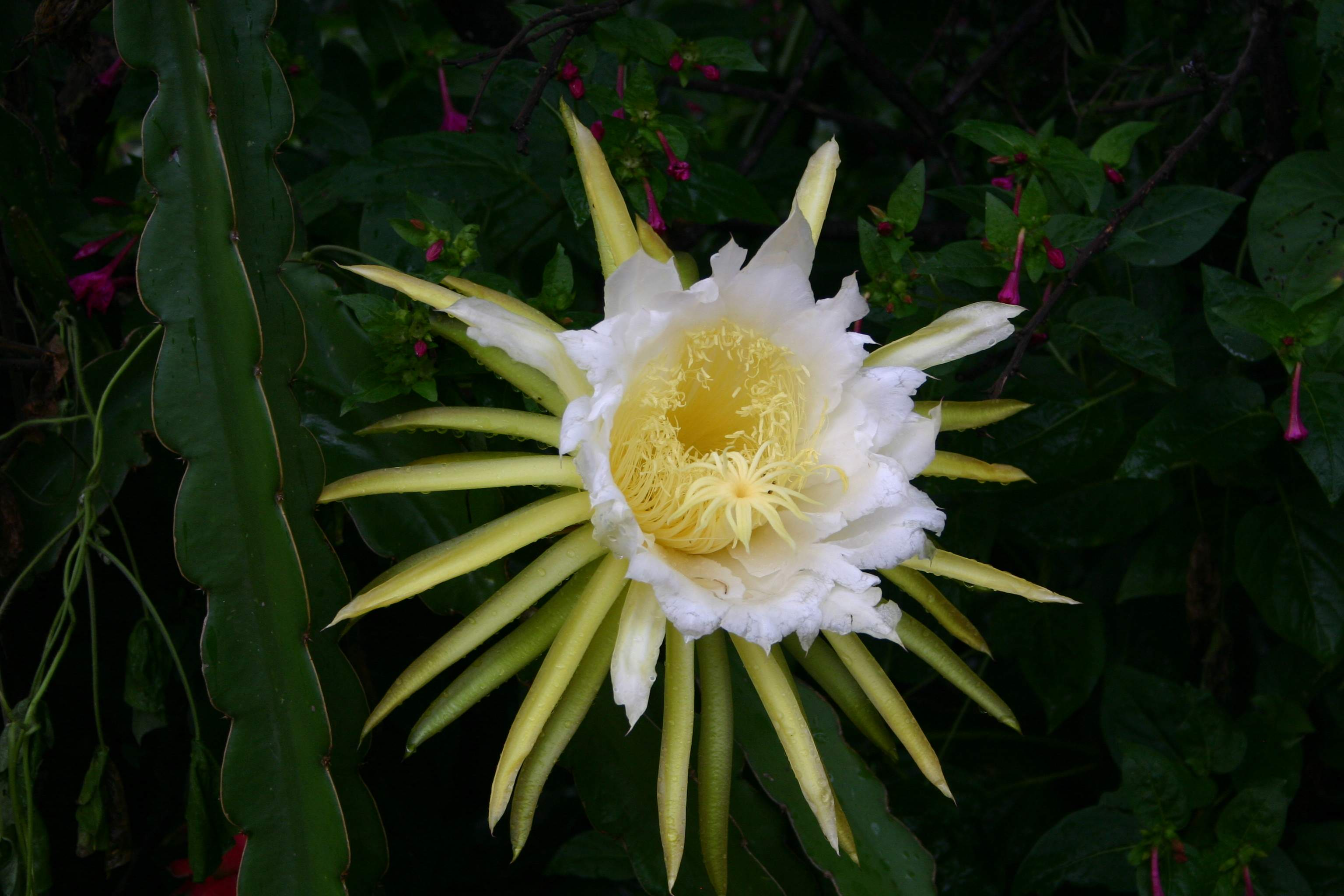

Scientific classification
- Kingdom: Plantae
- Clade: Tracheophytes
- Clade: Angiosperms
- Clade: Eudicots
- Order: Caryophyllales
- Family: Cactaceae
- Subfamily: Cactoideae
- Genus: Selenicereus
- Species: S. undatus

Binomial name
- Selenicereus undatus (Haworth) D.R.Hunt

Synonyms
- Cactus triangularis aphyllus Jacquin; Cereus triangularis major de Candolle; Cereus undatus Haworth; Cereus tricostatus Gosselin; Hylocereus tricostatus (Gosselin) Britton & Rose; Hylocereus undatus (Haworth) Britton & Rose

= Selenicereus undatus =

Species of cactus

Selenicereus undatus, the white-fleshed pitahaya, is a species of the genus Selenicereus (formerly Hylocereus) in the family Cactaceae and is the most cultivated species in the genus. It is used both as an ornamental vine and as a fruit crop, the pitahaya or dragon fruit.

Like all true cacti, the genus originates in the Americas. S. undatus is native from Mexico to Honduras; it may be a hybrid.

== Description ==
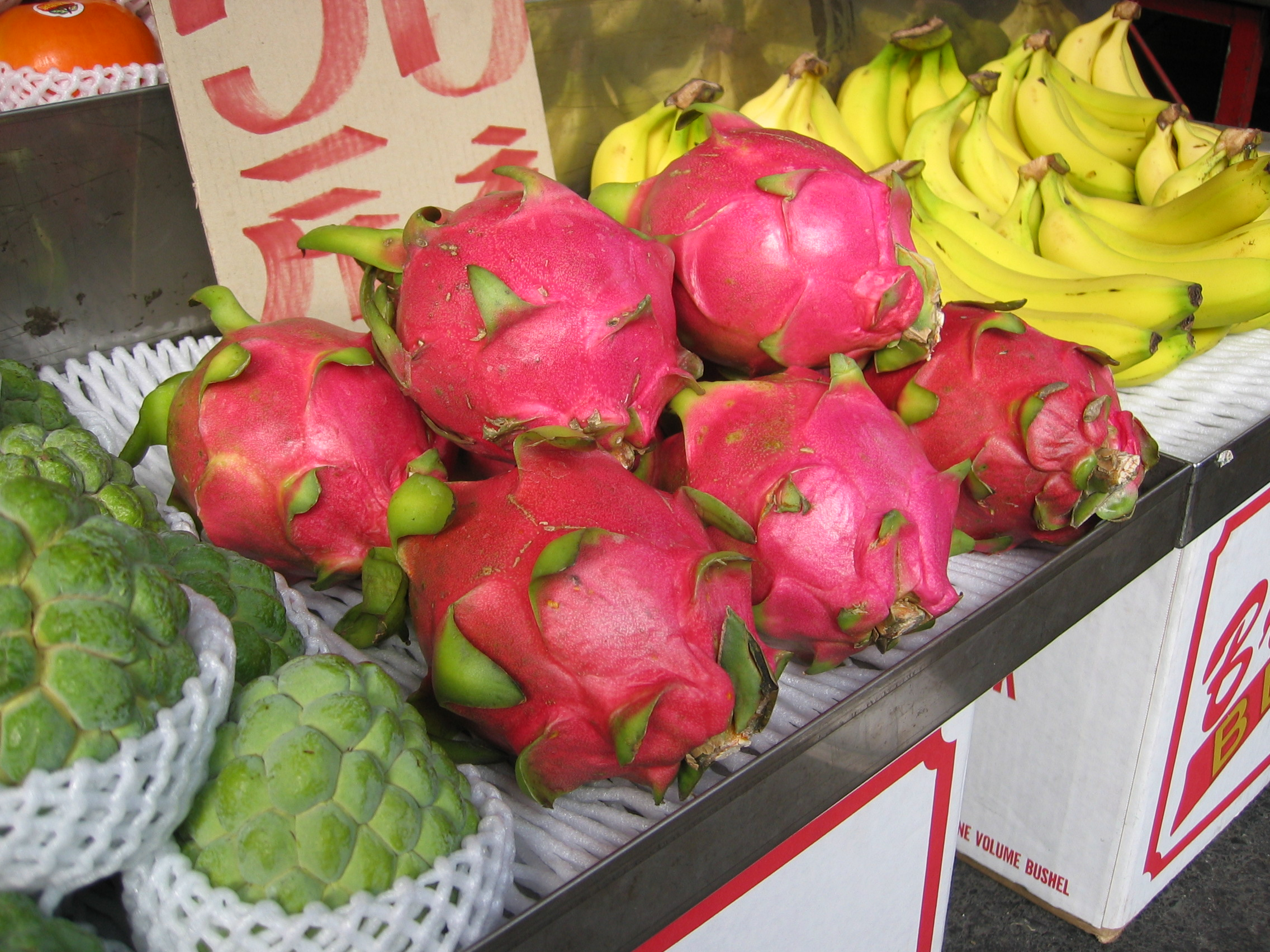
The red pitahaya at the Chiayi market, Taiwan

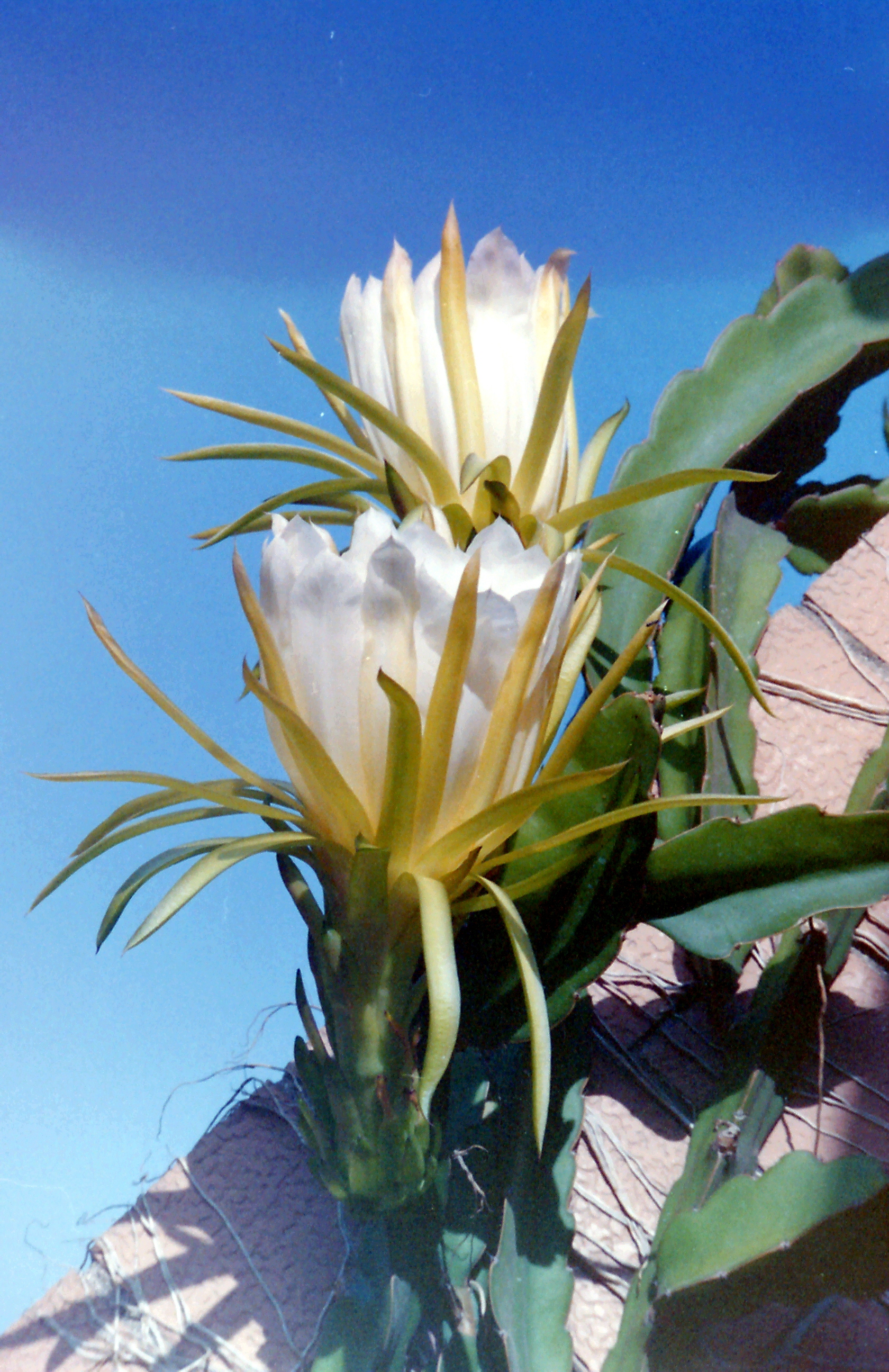
The flowers in Rome

=== Plant ===
The stems are scandent (climbing habit), creeping, sprawling or clambering, and branch profusely. There can be four to seven stems, between 5 and 10 m (16 and 33 ft) or longer, with joints from 30 to 120 cm (12 to 47 in) or longer, and 10 to 12 cm (3.9 to 4.7 in) thick; with generally three ribs; margins are corneous (horn-like) with age, and undulate.

Areoles, that is, the small area bearing spines or hairs on a cactus, are 2 mm (0.079 in) across with internodes 1 to 4 cm (0.39 to 1.57 in). Spines on the adult branches are 1 to 4 mm (0.039 to 0.157 in) long, being acicular (needle-like) to almost conical, and greyish brown to black in colour and spreading, with a deep green epidermis.

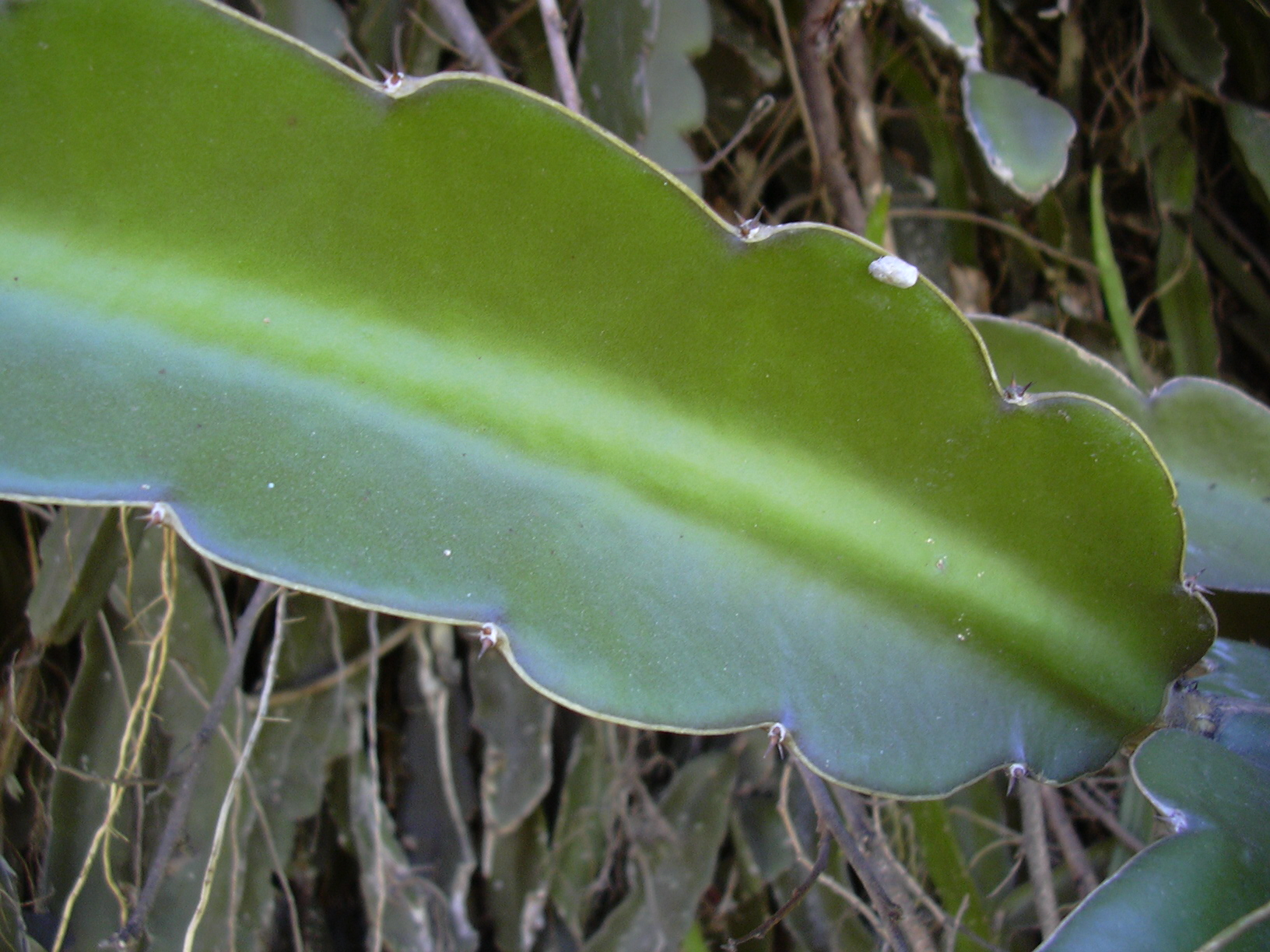
Segment

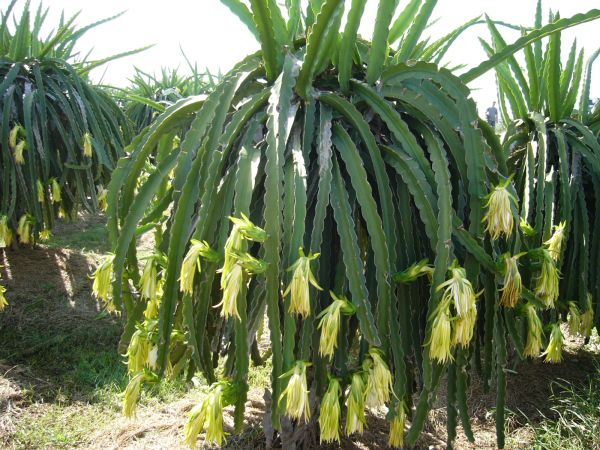
Plant

=== Flowers ===
The scented, nocturnal flowers are 25 to 30 cm (9.8 to 11.8 in) long, 15 to 17 cm (5.9 to 6.7 in) wide with the pericarpel 2.5 to 5 cm (0.98 to 1.97 in) long, about 2.5 cm (0.98 in) thick, bracteoles ovate, acute, to 2.5 to less than 4 cm (1.6 in) long; receptacle about 3 cm (1.2 in) thick, bracteoles are linear-lanceolate, 3 to 8 cm (1.2 to 3.1 in) long; outer tepals lanceolate-linear to linear, acuminate (tapering to a point), being 10 to 15 cm (3.9 to 5.9 in) long, 10 to 15 mm (0.39 to 0.59 in) wide and mucronate (ending in a short sharp point). Their colour is greenish-yellow or whitish, rarely rose-tinged; these outer tepals, or sepals, are about 65 in number, and bring the flower to a total width of up to 35 cm (14 in). The inner tepals are lanceolate (tapering to a point at the tip) to oblanceolate (i.e. more pointed at the base), up to 10 to 15 cm (3.9 to 5.9 in) long about 40 mm (1.6 in) wide at widest point, and mucronate, unbroken, sharp to acuminate (pointed), and white.

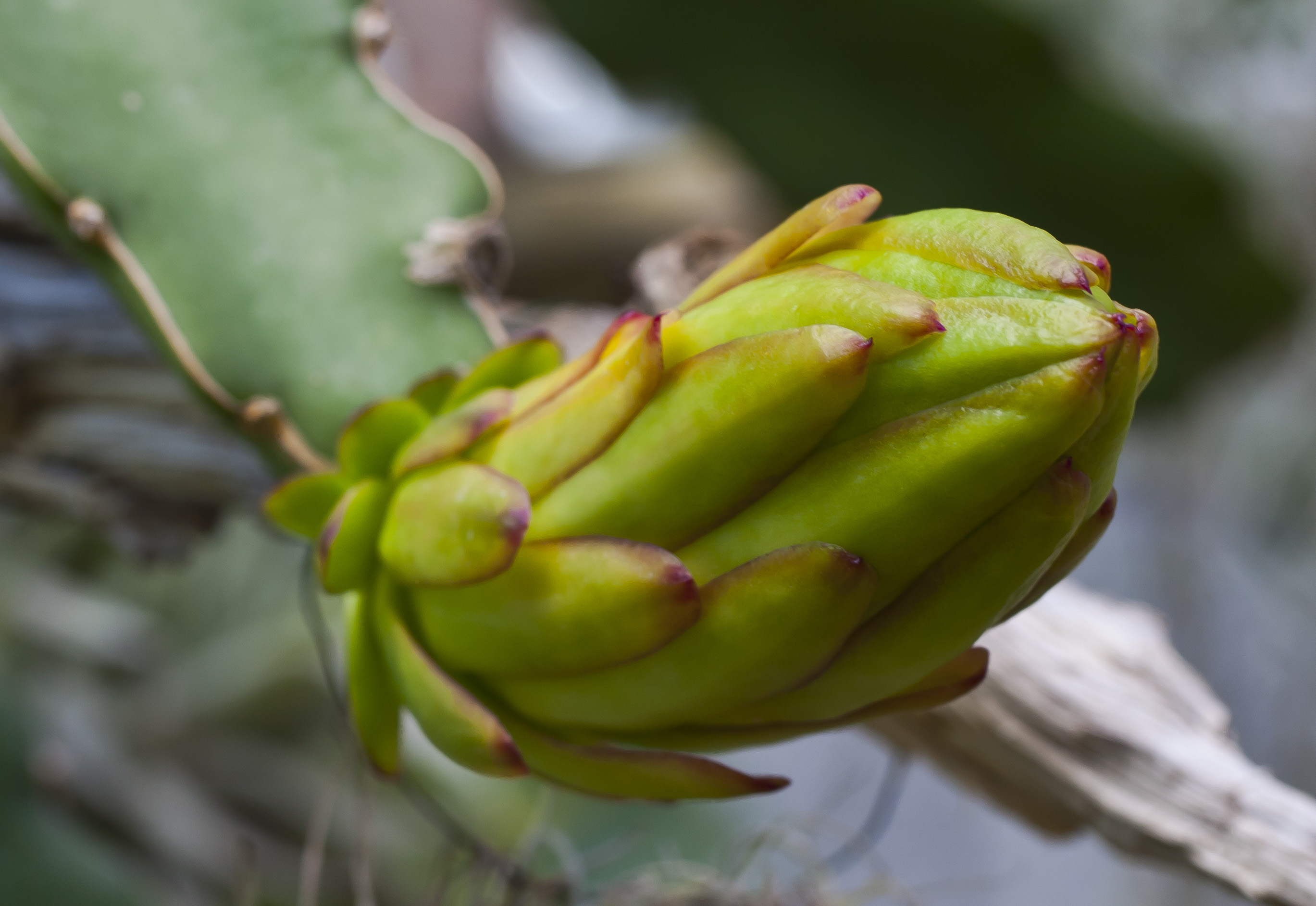
Flower bud

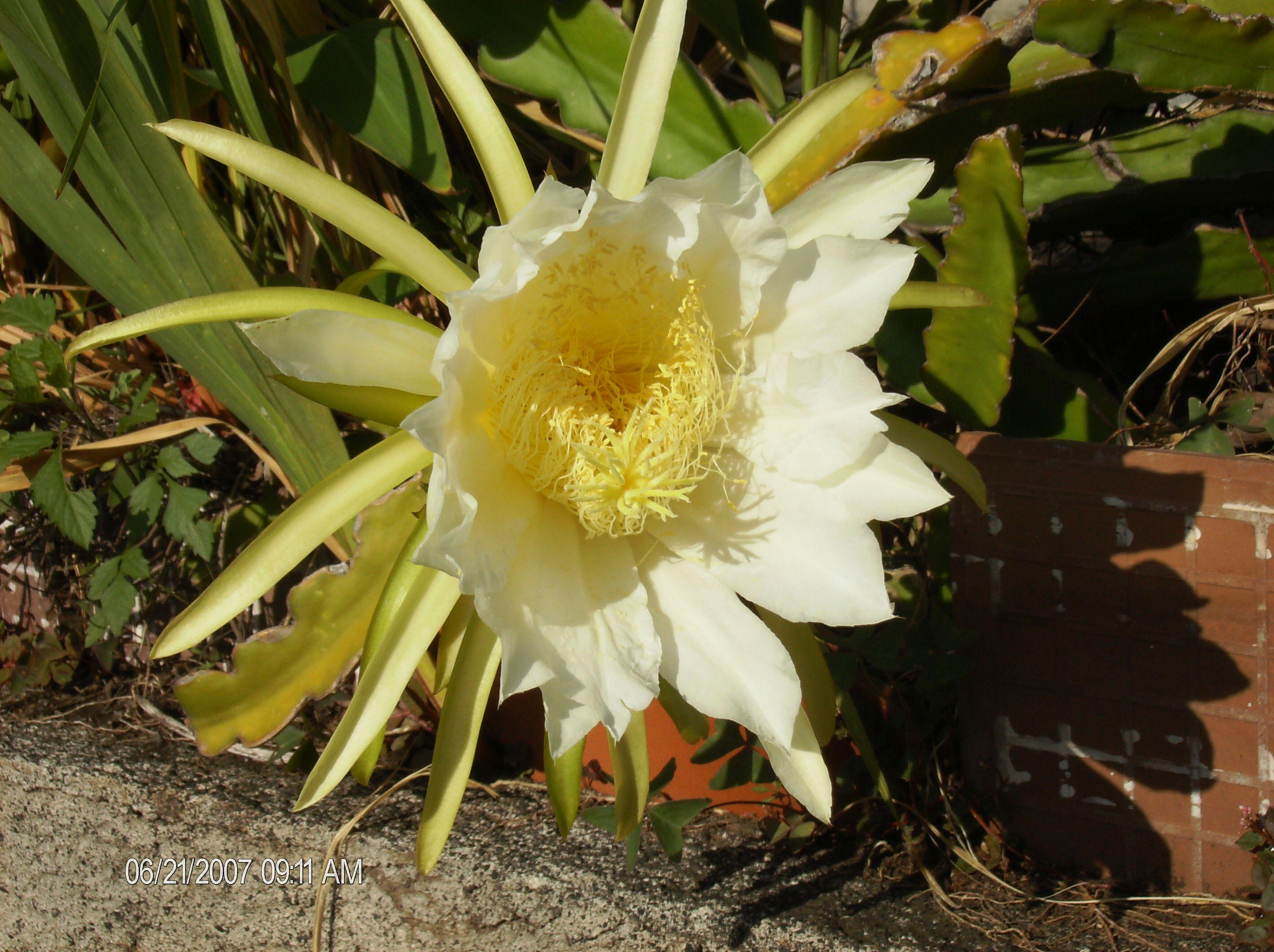
Blooming flower

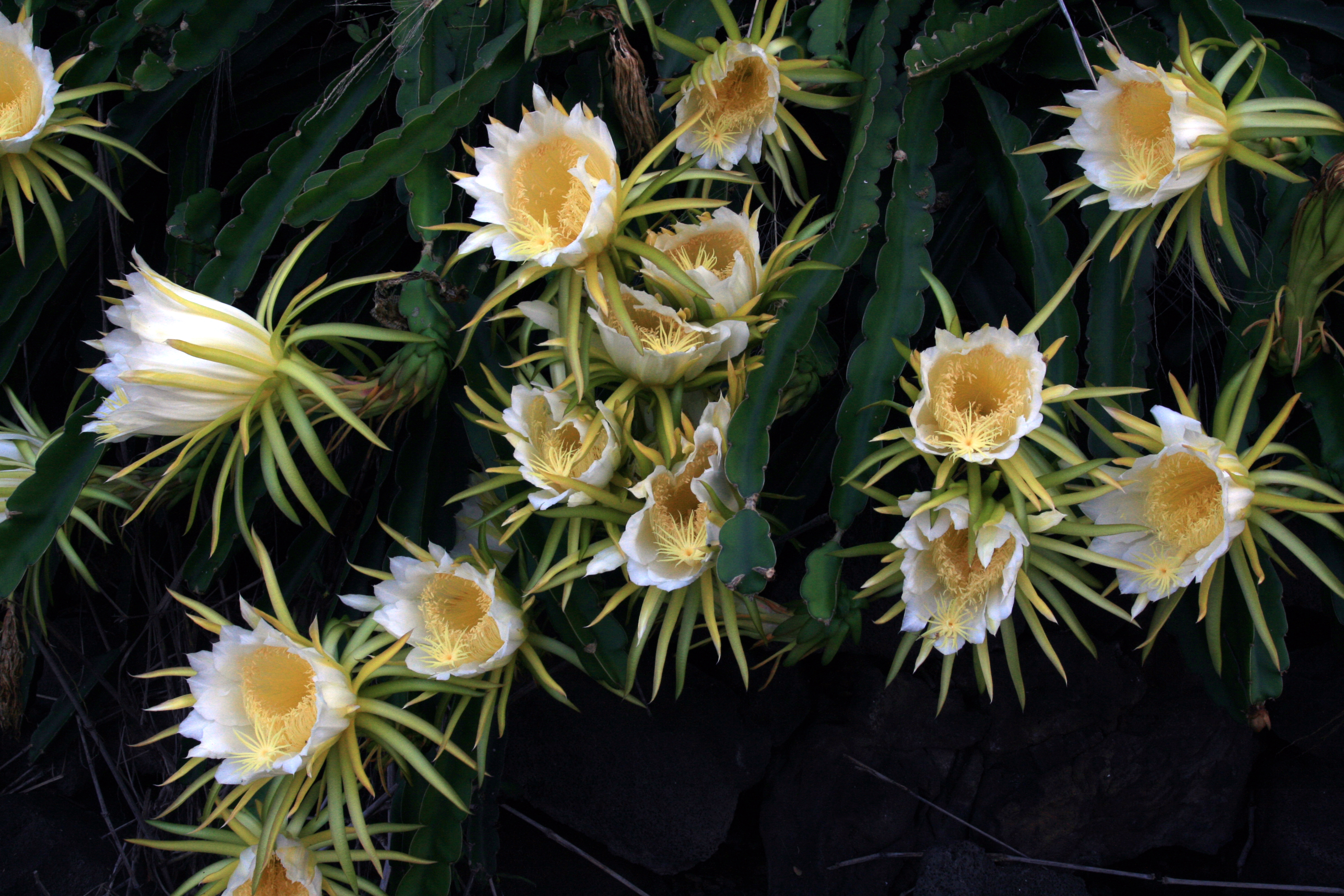
In bloom in Kona, Hawaii.

Stamens 5 to 10 cm (2.0 to 3.9 in) long, are declinate, inserted in one continuous zone from throat to 35 mm (1.4 in) above the pericarpel and cream. The style (bearing the stigma) to 17, they are 5 to 24.5 cm (2.0 to 9.6 in) long, stout, 6 to 8 mm (0.24 to 0.31 in) thick, cream, and up to 26 stigma lobes, they can be whole or sometimes split at the top, cream, about 25 mm (0.98 in) long. Nectar chambers are 30 mm (1.2 in) long.

=== Fruit ===
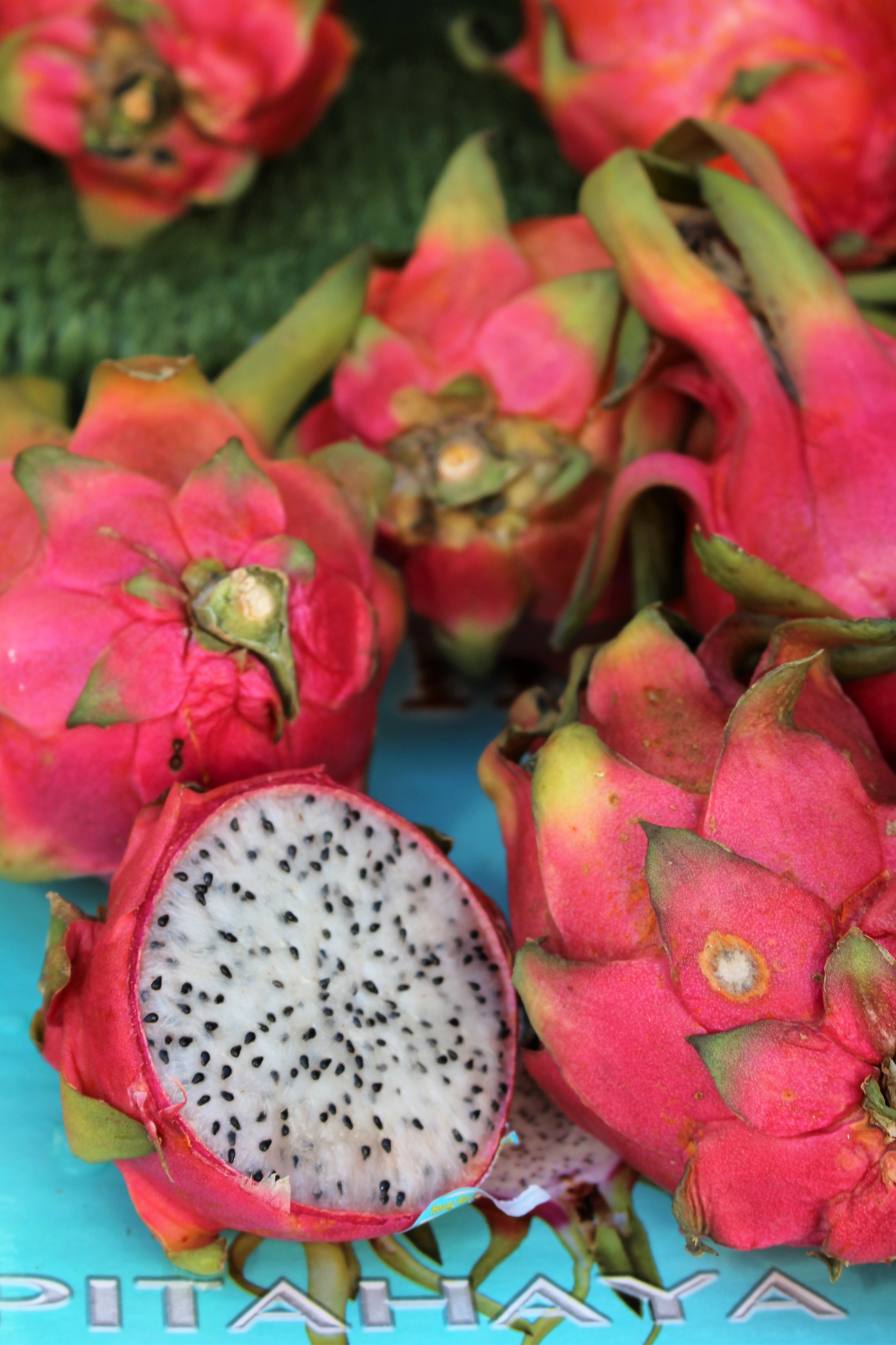
Mature fruit

The fruit is oblong to oval, 6 to 12 cm (2.4 to 4.7 in) long, 4 to 9 cm (1.6 to 3.5 in) thick, red with large bracteoles, with white, or more uncommonly, pink pulp and edible black seeds.

== Habitat ==
Selenicereus undatus is lithophytic or hemiepiphytic. It is widely distributed through the tropics in cultivation. It is a sprawling or vining, terrestrial or epiphytic cactus. They climb by use of aerial roots and can reach a height of 10 meters (33 feet) or more growing on rocks and trees.

== Systematics ==
This species is closely related to S. ocamponis and S. escuintlensis. Selenicereus undatus was described by (Haw.) Britton & Rose and published in Flora of Bermuda 256. 1918. In 2017, D. R. Hunt groups the genus Hylocereus within the genus Selenicereus. This has been supported by a phylogenetic analysis of the tribe Hylocereeae (Korotkova, et al., 2017), therefore this species is now treated under the name Selenicereus undatus

=== Taxonomy ===
The species epithet undatus in Latin means "wavy" from unda "wave", referring to the wavy edges of its branch ribs.

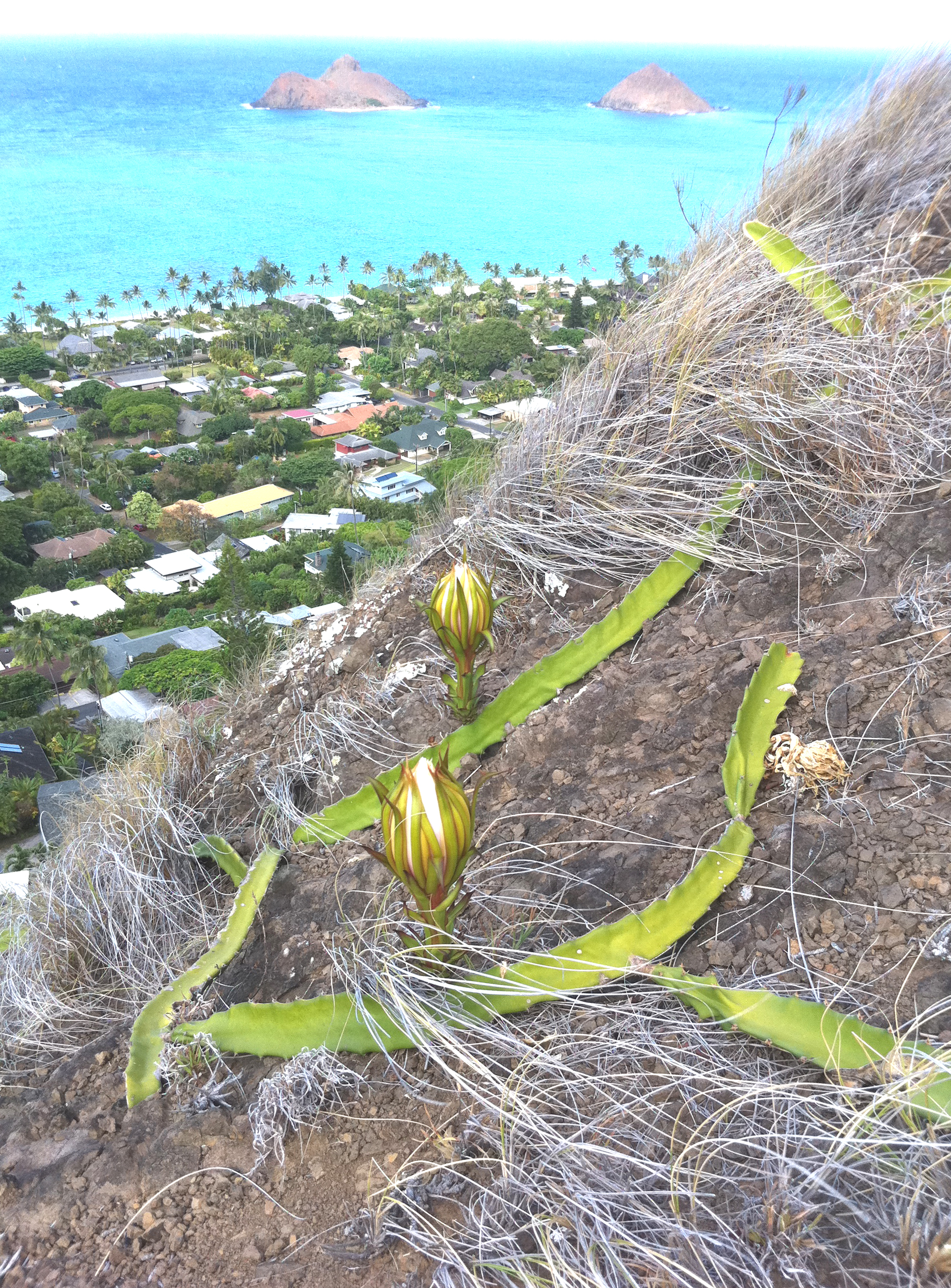
S. undatus shoots overlooking Lanikai and Nā Mokulua, Oʻahu, Hawaii.

=== Common names ===
Other common names in English include night blooming cereus, strawberry pear, belle of the night, Cinderella plant, Jesus in the cradle and moonflower.

== See also ==
- Pitahaya
- List of culinary fruits
