= Selenicereus ocamponis =

Conservation status
- Least Concern (IUCN 3.1)

Scientific classification
- Kingdom: Plantae
- Clade: Tracheophytes
- Clade: Angiosperms
- Clade: Eudicots
- Order: Caryophyllales
- Family: Cactaceae
- Subfamily: Cactoideae
- Genus: Selenicereus
- Species: S. ocamponis

Binomial name
- Selenicereus ocamponis (Salm-Dyck) D.R.Hunt

Synonyms
- Cereus ocamponis Salm-Dyck in Cact.; Hylocereus ocamponis (Salm-Dyck) Britton & Rose; Hylocereus bronxensis Britton & Rose

Species of flowering plant

Selenicereus ocamponis, also known as pitahaya de ocampo or pitahaya de purpus, is a species of plant in the family Cactaceae. It is a succulent native to Mexico, except for the Gulf of Mexico, where it has only been introduced.

== Description ==
The pulp and pericarp of S. ocamponis's fruit is purplish in color. Its flowers have green or purple outer petals with white inner petals, and are about 25 to 32 cm long and 20 to 25 cm wide. The fruit is edible.

== Distribution and habitat ==
Selenicereus ocamponis commonly occurs in low dry forests, as well as rock outcrops or other large rock formations. It is an epiphyte that grows on rocks.

== Uses ==
Selenicereus ocamponis is commonly cultivated in home gardens in Mexico. However, it is considered underutilized. Due to its purple pericarp and pulp, S. ocamponis may have potential as a colorant.
