= Night-blooming cereus =

Common name for several species of cactus

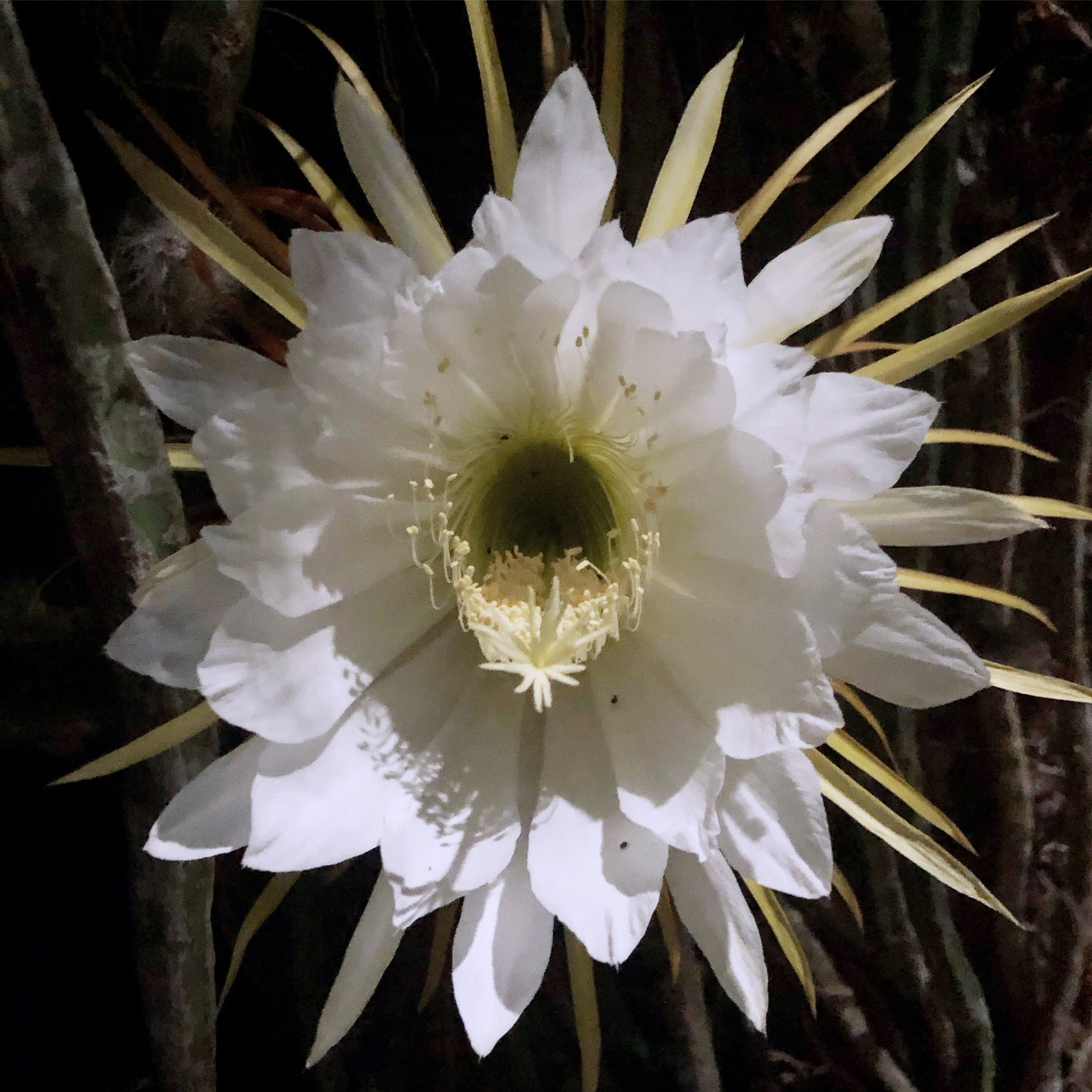
Hylocereus undatus

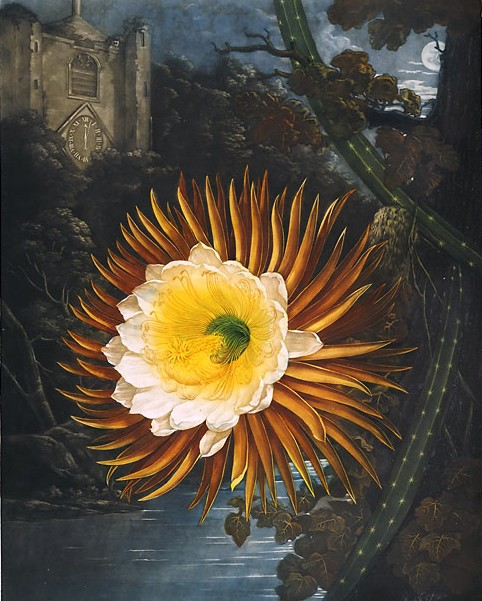
Selenicereus grandiflorus

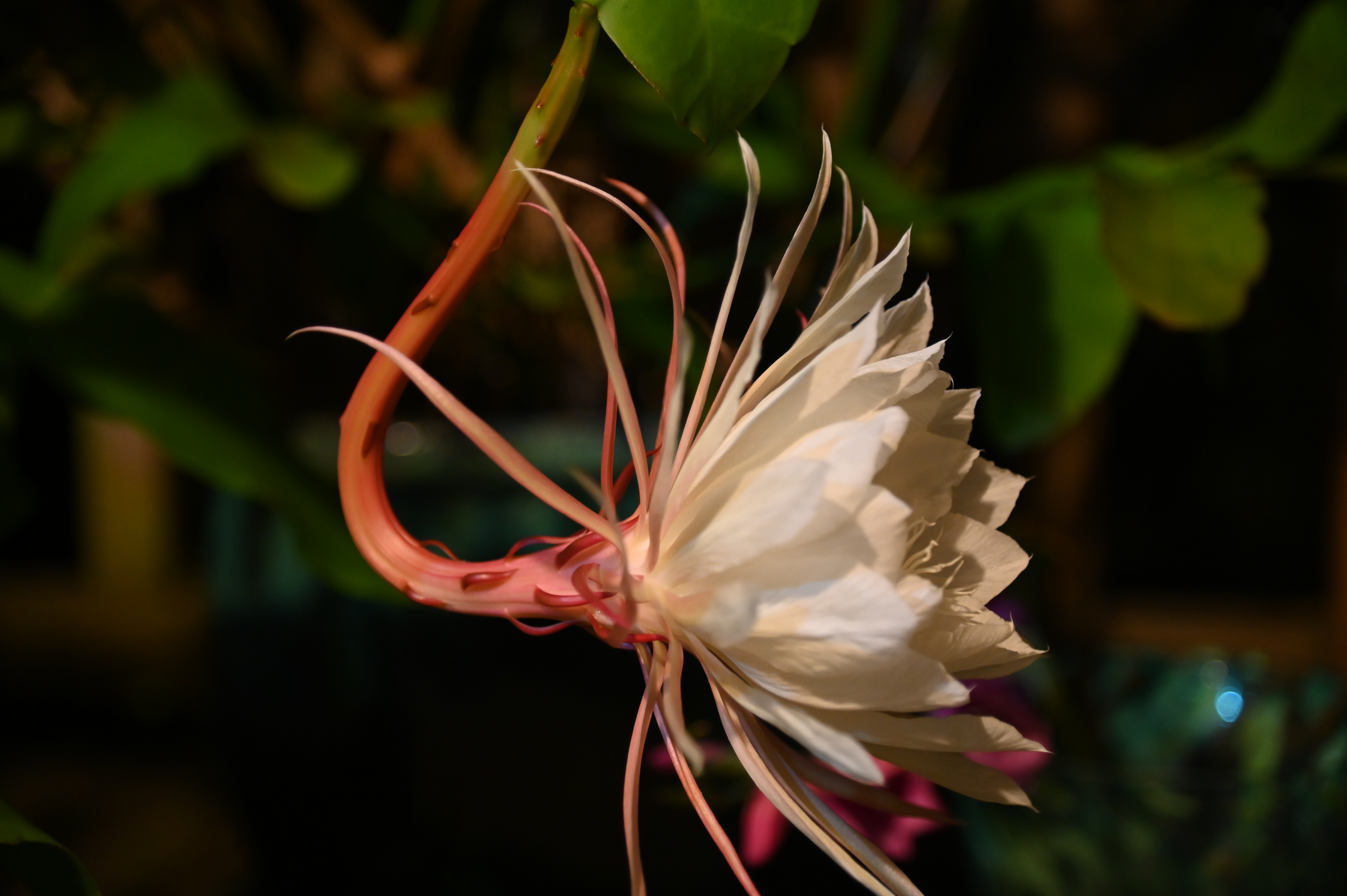
Night-blooming cereus in full bloom in late August

Night-blooming cereus is the common name referring to many flowering ceroid cacti that bloom at night. The flowers are short lived, and in some of these species, such as Selenicereus grandiflorus, each flower blooms for a single night, though most put out multiple flowers over several weeks, each of which opens for only a single night. Other names for one or more cacti with this habit are nightblooming frivolous , princess of the night, Honolulu queen (for Hylocereus undatus), Christ in the manger, dama de noche, and queen of the night (which is also used for an unrelated plant species).

== Genera and species ==
While many cacti referred to as night-blooming cereus belong to the tribe Cereeae, other night-blooming cacti in the subfamily Cactoideae may also be called night-blooming cereus. Cacti which may be called by this name include:

- Cereus
- Echinopsis (usually Echinopsis pachanoi, San Pedro cactus)
- Epiphyllum (usually Epiphyllum oxypetalum, gooseneck cactus; grown as an indoor houseplant throughout the world, and the most popular cultivated night-blooming cereus)
- Harrisia
- Hylocereus (of which Hylocereus undatus is the most frequently cultivated outdoors and is the main source of the commercial fruit crop, dragon fruit)
- Monvillea
- Nyctocereus (usually Nyctocereus serpentinus)
- Peniocereus (Peniocereus greggii, the best known, is strictly a desert plant which grows from an underground tuber and is infrequently cultivated)
- Selenicereus (usually Selenicereus grandiflorus)
- Trichocereus

== Description ==
Regardless of genus or species, night-blooming cereus flowers are almost always white or very pale shades of other colors, often large and frequently fragrant. Most of the flowers open after nightfall, and by dawn, most are wilting. Plants in the same geographical area tend to bloom on the same night. Also, for healthy plants, there can sometimes be as many as three separate blooming events spread out over the warmest months. The plants that bear such flowers can be tall, columnar, and sometimes extremely large and tree-like, but more frequently are thin-stemmed climbers. While some night-blooming cereus are grown indoors in homes or greenhouses in colder climates, most plants are too large or ungainly for this treatment and are only found outdoors in tropical areas.

== Cultivation and uses ==
The dried flowers of the night-blooming cereus (霸王花) are a common ingredient used in Cantonese slow-simmered soup (traditional Chinese: 老火湯; pinyin: lǎohuǒ tāng; Jyutping: lou5 fo2 tong1). Some night-blooming cereus plants produce fruits which are large enough for people to consume. These include some of the members of the genus Cereus, but most commonly the fruit of the Hylocereus. Hylocereus fruit has the advantage of lacking exterior spines, in contrast to the fruit of cacti such as the Selenicereus fruit, being brightly colored and having a pleasant taste. Since the late 1990s, Hylocereus fruit has been commercially grown and sold in tropical locations like Australia, the Philippines, Vietnam, Taiwan, and Hawaii.

== See also ==
- Ceroid cactus
- Pitaya
- Queen of the Night
