= Queen of the Night =

Queen of the Night may refer to:

== Botany ==
- Queen of the night, Night-blooming cereus, several genera and species of cactus, especially:
  - Epiphyllum oxypetalum
  - Selenicereus grandiflorus
- Queen of the night, Cestrum nocturnum, a woody evergreen commonly known as night-blooming cestrum
- Reina de la noche ("queen of the night" in Spanish), Brugmansia, also called angel's trumpet

== Archaeology ==
- Queen of the Night Relief, formerly known as the Burney Relief, a Mesopotamian terracotta plaque in the British Museum, who adopted the new name in 2003

== Film, television, and theater ==
- The Queen of the Night, a 1994 Mexican film
- La Femme d'une nuit, a 1931 French film
- Queen of the Night (1931 German-language film) (Königin einer Nacht), a 1931 German film
- Queen of the Night (1931 Italian-language film) (La donna di una notte), a 1931 Italian film
- Queen of the Night (1951 film), a West German musical film
- Queen of the Night (2001 film) (Kraljica noći), a Croatian film
- Queen of the Night (2013 film), a South Korean film
- Queen of the Night (2014 film), Canadian film released as The Captive
- Queen of the Night, a 2013 immersive theater production at Sony Hall

== Literature ==
- Queen of the Night, a 2010 novel by J. A. Jance
- The Queen of the Night, a 2016 novel by Alexander Chee

== Music ==
- Queen of the Night, or Königin der Nacht, a major character in the 1791 Mozart opera The Magic Flute
  - "Queen of the Night aria" ("Der Hölle Rache kocht in meinem Herzen")
- Queen of the Night (Maggie Bell album)
- Queen of the Night (Loleatta Holloway album), 1978
- "Queen of the Night" (song), a 1993 single by Whitney Houston
- "Queen of the Night", a song by Angra from their EP Freedom Call
- "Queen of the Night", a song by Lovex from their 2011 album Watch Out!
- "Queen of the Night", a song by Aden Foyer from their album Queen of the Night
- "Queen of the Night", an album from 2022 by singer-songwriting rock band, Dirt Poor Robins
