= Parque Genovés =

Historical garden in Cádiz, Andalusia, Spain

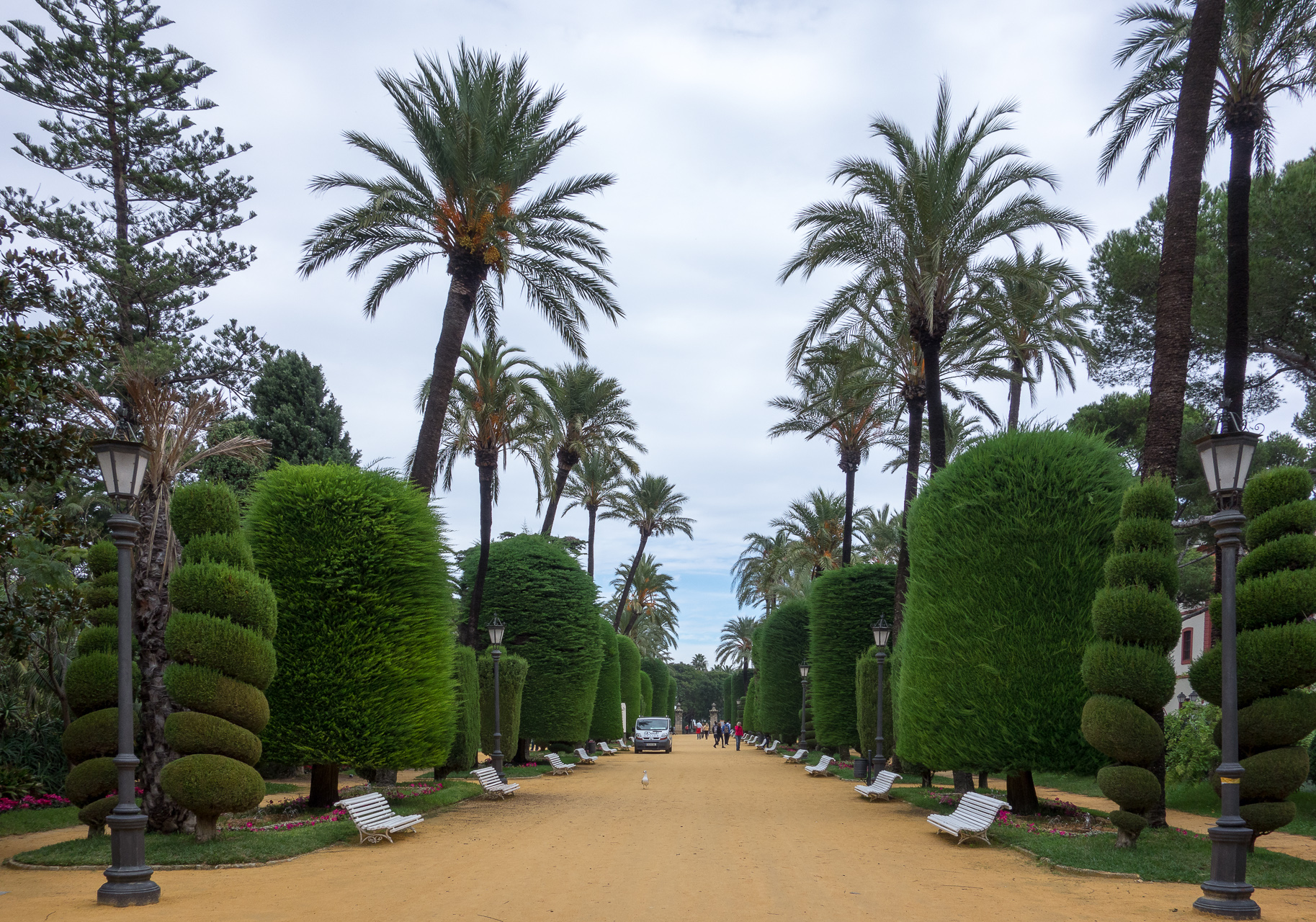
- View of the main path.
- Interactive map of Parque Genovés
- Type: Urban garden
- Location: Cádiz, Spain
- Coordinates: 36°32′9″N 6°18′14″W
- Area: 3 hectares (7.4 acres)
- Created: 18th century
- Status: Open all year
- Public transit: Local bus: line 2

Parque Genovés is a historical garden located in the seaside of Cádiz city in Andalusia, Spain. Its origin can be traced back to the middle of the 18th century, having been widened and remodeled a few times since then.

It owes its name to a former city major called Eduardo José Genovés, who made important reforms to it.

The garden has a great number of plant species, including some which thrive properly in tropical latitudes, being it possible due to the high humidity of the city combined with the mild temperatures that characterize the Mediterranean climate. A group of them have drawn special interest, either for their longevity or big size.

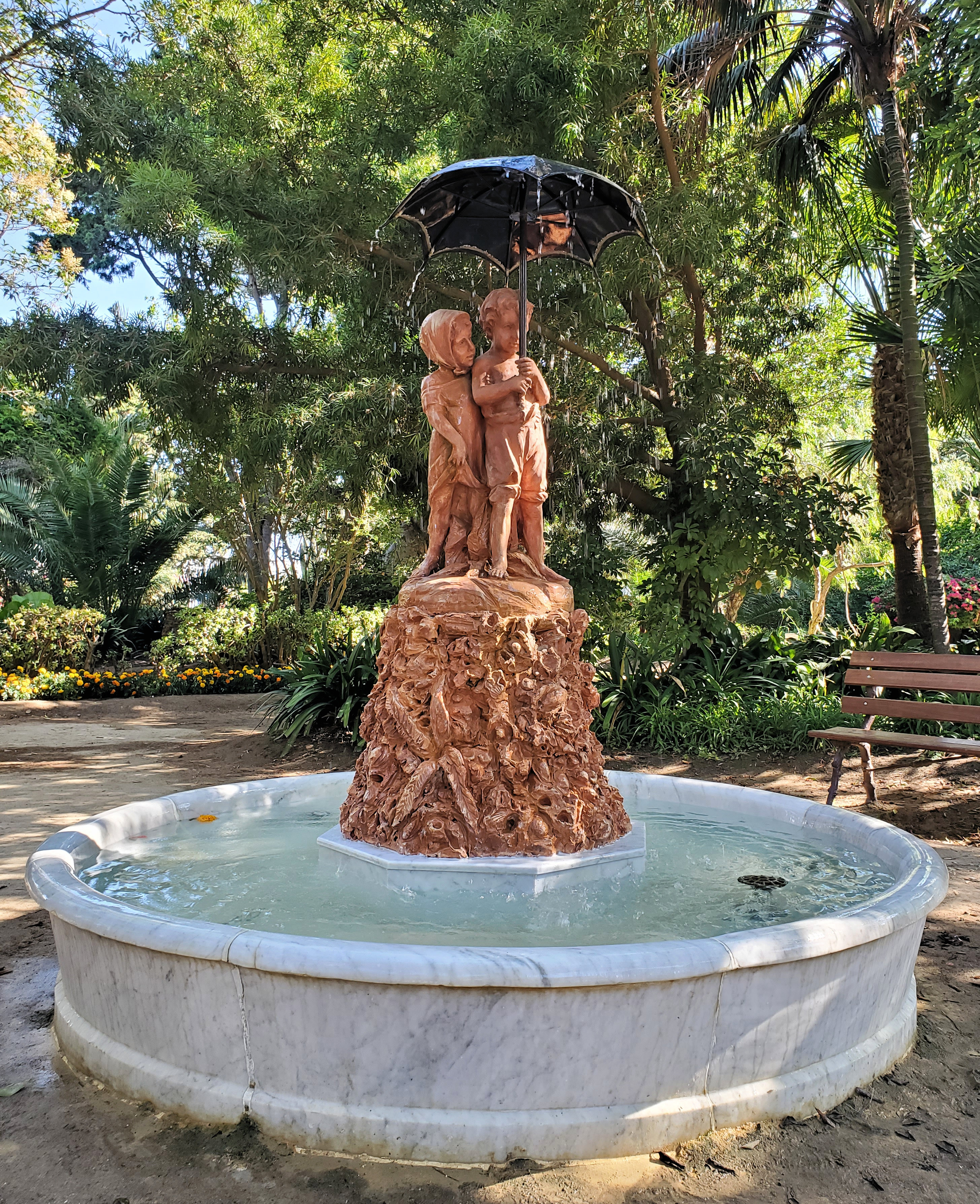
Niños bajo el paraguas (Kids Under Umbrella), Cádiz.

Besides the plant species, considered a matter of interest are also the statues and memorials that pay homage to notable people and historical facts that influenced the history of Spain. Examples of them are the botanist Celestino Mutis, composer Manuel de Falla and the Battle of Trafalgar.

The park has an artificial waterfall with a platform above that allows to appreciate the views of the Atlantic Ocean, as well as a passage inside the rocks underneath. Close to it, there is a playground area for children and a bar.

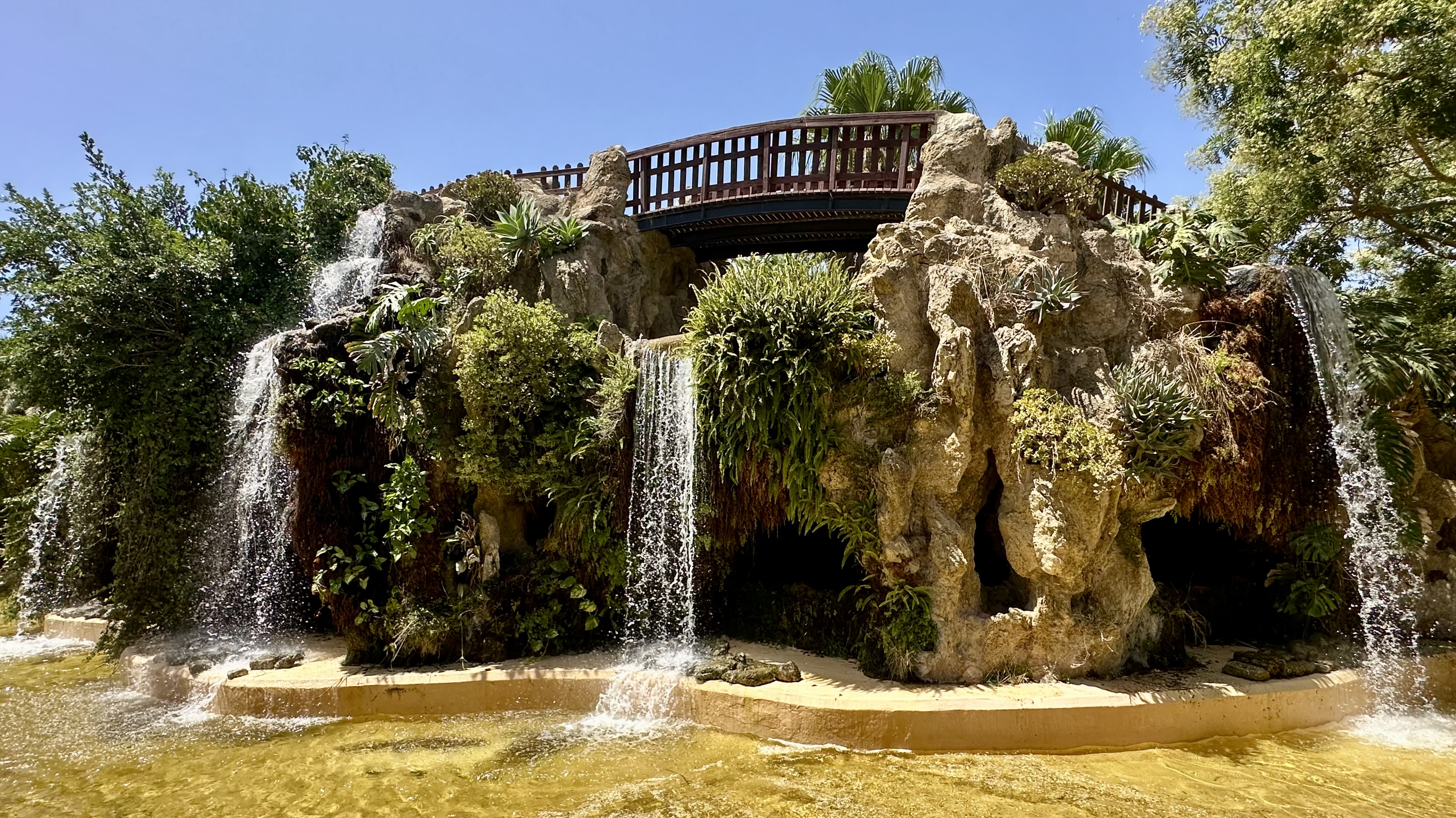
Waterfall.

== Main plant species ==
- Monterey cypress (Cupressus macrocarpa). They can be seen displayed on the main walk path, shaped in geometric forms and other ones that emulate Solomonic columns as a result of topiary works.
- Pohutukawa (Metrosideros excelsa). One of the oldest European specimens of this species is located in the park.
- Norfolk Island pine (Araucaria heterophylla). These ones reach a height of more than 40 meters tall.
- Drago (Dracaena draco). This centenary specimen is up to 200 years old.
- Lady of the night, night-blooming jasmine (Cestrum nocturnum).
- Bitter orange tree (Citrus × aurantium).
- Silk floss tree (Ceiba speciosa).
