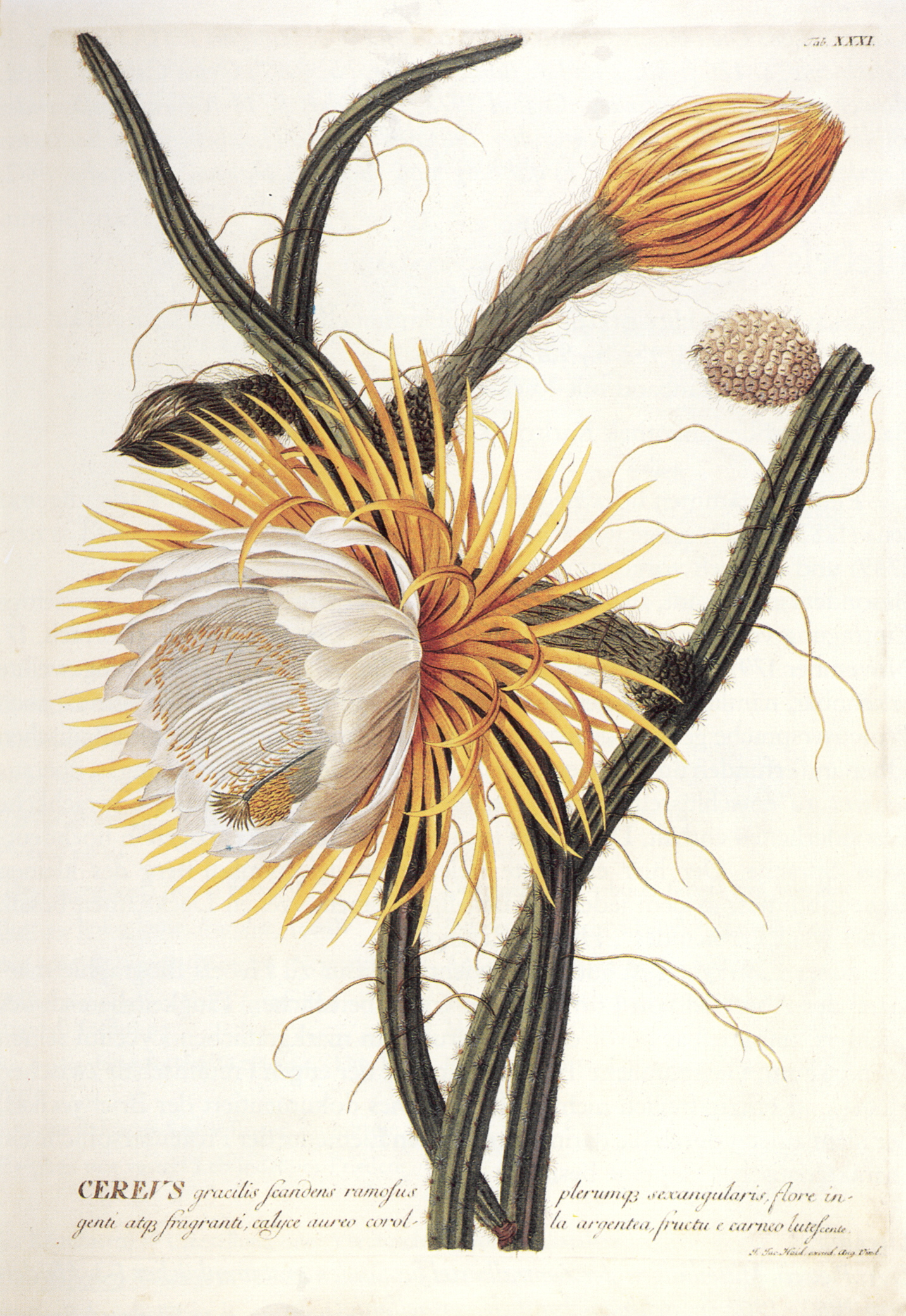

Conservation status
- Least Concern (IUCN 3.1)

Scientific classification
- Kingdom: Plantae
- Clade: Embryophytes
- Clade: Tracheophytes
- Clade: Angiosperms
- Clade: Eudicots
- Order: Caryophyllales
- Family: Cactaceae
- Subfamily: Cactoideae
- Genus: Selenicereus
- Species: S. grandiflorus

Binomial name
- Selenicereus grandiflorus (L.) Britton & Rose, (1909) Contr. US Nat. Herb. 2:430

Synonyms
- Cactus grandiflorus L. (1753) Sp. Pl. 467; Cereus donkelaarii Salm-Dyck Allg. Gartenz. xiii. Cereus grandiflorus (L.) Mill. (1768) Gard. Dict. ed. 8, no 11; Cereus grandiflorus affinis Salm-Dyck (1850) Cact. Hort. Dyck. 1849:51, 216; Cereus grandiflorus var. spectabilis Karwinsky in Förster (1846) Handb.Cact. 415; Cereus scandens minor Boerhaave in Arendt (1891) Monatsschr. Kakteenk. 1:82; Cereus schmidtii (1894) Monatsschr. Kakteenk. 4:189; Cereus grandiflorus var. minor Salm-Dyck; Cereus tellii hort. in Hildmann (1895) Monatsschr. Kakt. 5:43; Cereus grandiflorus var. haitiensis (1903) Monatsschr. Kakteenk. 13:183; Cereus hondurensis K. Schumann in Weingart (1904) Monatsschr. Kakteenk. 14:147; Cereus grandiflorus uranos Riccobono (1909) Boo. R. Ort. Bot. Palermo 8:249; Selenicereus donkelaarii (Salm-Dyck) Britton & Rose (1917) Standard Cycl. Hortic. 3141; Selenicereus grandiflorus var. affinis (Salm-Dyck) Borg (1951) Cacti 206; Selenicereus grandiflorus var. tellii (hort. ex Riccobono) Borg (1951) Cacti 206; Selenicereus grandiflorus var. uranos (Riccobono) Borg (1951) 206; Cereus uranos hort. Selenicereus hondurensis (K. Schumann) Britton & Rose (1909) Contr. US. Nat Herb. 12:430

= Selenicereus grandiflorus =

Queen of the night

Species of cactus native to Central America and the Caribbean

Selenicereus grandiflorus is a cactus species originating from the Antilles, Mexico and Central America. The species is commonly referred to as queen of the night, night-blooming cereus (though these two terms are also used for other species), large-flowered cactus, sweet-scented cactus or vanilla cactus. The true species is extremely rare in cultivation. Most of the plants under this name belong to other species or hybrids. It is often confused with the genus Epiphyllum.

== Etymology ==
Grandiflorus is Latin for 'large flowered'. When Carl Linnaeus described this cactus in 1753 it was the largest flowered species of cacti known. Paradoxically, its flowers are moderate in size compared with several other Selenicereus species.

== History ==
The first species to be brought into cultivation. Linnaeus described it in 1753, but it was known long before. Records from Hortus Kewensis gives that the species was grown at Royal Gardens at Hampton Court before 1700. There has been doubt about which plant was available to Linnaeus when he drew up his description, but this is solved and both the plates on this side show the authentic species.

== Origin and habitat ==
It is native throughout the Greater Antilles (Cuba, Cayman Islands, Puerto Rico, Jamaica, the Dominican Republic, and Haiti), Mexico, Guatemala, Belize, Honduras, Nicaragua, and a few other locations in South and Central America. It is found climbing on trees and on rocks at an altitude of 700 metres. It has extremely variable stems, especially in Jamaica, with slightly wavy to strongly knobby margins occurring in the same plant, which causes confusion in cultivation. Many species of Selenicereus should be reduced to synonyms of subspecies of this species, differing merely in degree rather than in kind.

== Cultivation ==
S. grandiflorus is a fast-growing epiphytic and lithophytic plant, though it takes two to three years to begin producing blooms. Keep it on the dry side each winter, and move it outdoors under a shade tree in late spring. It needs compost containing plenty of humus and sufficient moisture in summer. It should not be kept under 5 °C (41 °F) in winter and performs best if grown in full sun. Extra light in the early spring will stimulate budding. Flowers in late spring or early summer, only blooms one night a year for several years and withers within hours.

== Description ==
The bloom and wither of a Selenicereus grandiflorus (time-lapse)

Stems scandent, clambering or sprawling, branching, sometimes forming tangles, producing aerial roots, stiff, to 10 m long or more, (10)15–25(–30)mm thick; ribs (4–)7–8(–10), low, less so on older branches, separated by broad, rounded intervals, slightly wavy to strongly knobby; areoles small, wool white or greyish white, internodes (6–)12–20 mm; spines 5–18, to 4.5–12 mm, basally ca 0,25 mm in diameter, acicular, elliptic or circular in cross section, bulbous basally, spreading, yellowish brown to brownish or yellow, grey in age, eventually deciduous hairs from lower part of areole ± numerous white or brownish, mature vegetative areoles usually lacking hairs, juvenile plants have spines shorter and fewer; epidermis glaucous green or bluish green, often ± purplish, smooth. Flowers 17–22.5 cm long and reportedly as much as 15 inches (38 cm) in width. Fragrance reminding of vanilla and orange-flower; pericarpel 25 mm long, with bracteoles 5 mm, strap-shaped and yellowish, covered with nearly white or tawny hairs and sharp bristles; receptacle 7.5–8.7 cm, bracteoles 5–14mm, strap-shaped to linear, yellowish with long, nearly white or tawny, wavy hairs and sharp bristles in their axils, ca 25mm long; outer tepals 7.5–10 cm long, averaging 4.5 mm wide, linear-attenuate, light brown, salmon to pink buff, yellowish adaxially; inner tepals 7.5–10 cm long, 9–12(–15) mm, shorter than outer tepals, wide, lanceolate, gradually narrowed into a pointed or acute apex, white; stamens 38–50 mm long, delinate, white, anthers 1.5mm long, yellowish; style 15–20 cm long, often longer than inner tepals, 1.5 mm greatest diameter, stigma lobes 7–12, ca 7.5 mm long, slender. Fruit ovoid, 5–9 cm long, 4.5–7 cm thick, whitish, partly pink, pink, yellow or orange, covered with clusters of spines and hairs which soon drop off, juicy, the imbilicus small and inconspicuous. Four subspecies are recognized:

  - ssp. donkelaarii (Salm-Dyck) Ralf Bauer
  - ssp. grandiflorus
  - ssp. hondurensis (K.Schum. ex Weing.) Ralf Bauer
  - ssp. lautneri Ralf Bauer

== Hybrids ==
Selenicereus ×callianthus (Gaillard) Lindinger (1942). This is a hybrid between this species and Selenicereus pteranthus. Many plants under the name Selenicereus grandiflorus may belong to this cross. It is very similar to Selenicereus pteranthus, but stems more slender and spines, longer and yellowish.

== See also ==
- Bahamian dry forests
- Night blooming cereus – for other cacti sharing this name
- Arizona queen of the night
