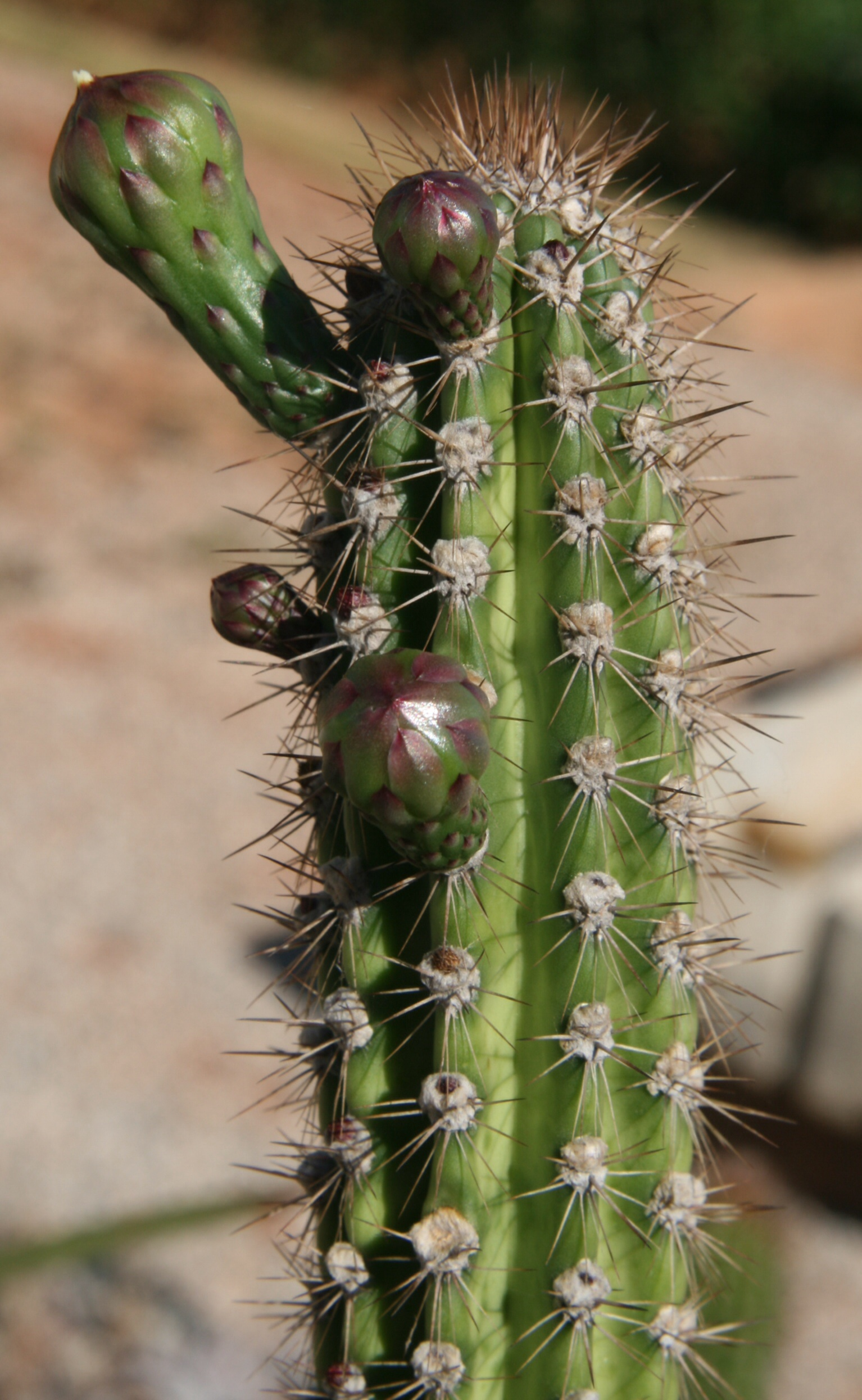

Scientific classification
- Kingdom: Plantae
- Clade: Tracheophytes
- Clade: Angiosperms
- Clade: Eudicots
- Order: Caryophyllales
- Family: Cactaceae
- Subfamily: Cactoideae
- Genus: Monvillea
- Species: M. euchlora

Binomial name
- Monvillea euchlora (F.A.C.Weber ex K.Schum.) Backeb.

Synonyms
- Cereus alticostatus (F.Ritter) P.J.Braun; Cereus campinensis (Backeb. & Voll) P.J.Braun; Cereus campinensis subsp. piedadensis (F.Ritter) P.J.Braun & Esteves; Cereus campinensis var. piedadensis (F.Ritter) P.J.Braun; Cereus euchlorus F.A.C.Weber ex K.Schum.; Cereus euchlorus subsp. alticostatus (F.Ritter) P.J.Braun & Esteves; Cereus euchlorus subsp. leucanthus (F.Ritter) P.J.Braun & Esteves; Cereus lauterbachii K.Schum.; Monvillea alticostata F.Ritter; Monvillea campinensis (Backeb. & Voll) Backeb.; Monvillea lauterbachii (K.Schum.) Borg; Monvillea leucantha F.Ritter; Monvillea piedadensis F.Ritter; Pilocereus campinensis Backeb. & Voll; Praecereus campinensis (Backeb. & Voll) Buxb.; Praecereus euchlorus subsp. euchlorus in; Praecereus euchlorus (F.A.C.Weber ex K.Schum.) N.P.Taylor

= Monvillea euchlora =

Species of cactus

Monvillea euchlora is a flowering plant in the cactus family Cactaceae that is found in Brazil, Bolivia and Paraguay at elevations of 700 to 1300 meters

== Description ==
Monvillea euchlora initially grows slightly upright, is less branched and later bent over and leaning in sympathy. The slender shoots are up to 5 meters long. There are 4 to 14 low and sharp-edged ribs. The up to 20 thorns are weak, whitish, needlelike and often very unevenly long. The up to 4 middle spines, which may be missing, are up to 5 (rarely to 7.5) inches long. The much shorter edge spines have a length of 5 to 10 (rarely to 15) millimeters.

The white to greenish white flowers are up to 8 centimeters long. Their pericarpell and the flower tube are covered with very little scales and otherwise bald. The fruits are elongated.

== Taxonomy ==
Originally described as Cereus euchlorus by Karl Moritz Schumann in 1897, its specific epithet derives from the Greek words "eu" (real) and "chloros" (green), referring to the plant's vibrant green shoots. In 1997, Nigel Paul Taylor reclassified the species into the genus Praecereus. As of November 2025, Plants of the World Online places the species in the genus Monvillea as Monvillea euchlora.

== Distribution ==
Monvillea euchlora is found slopes on rocky outcrops in southern and western Brazil, Bolivia, and northeast Argentina growing from sea level to 2000 meters. It is also found in Paraguay.
