= Ceroid cactus =

Any cactus with an elongated body

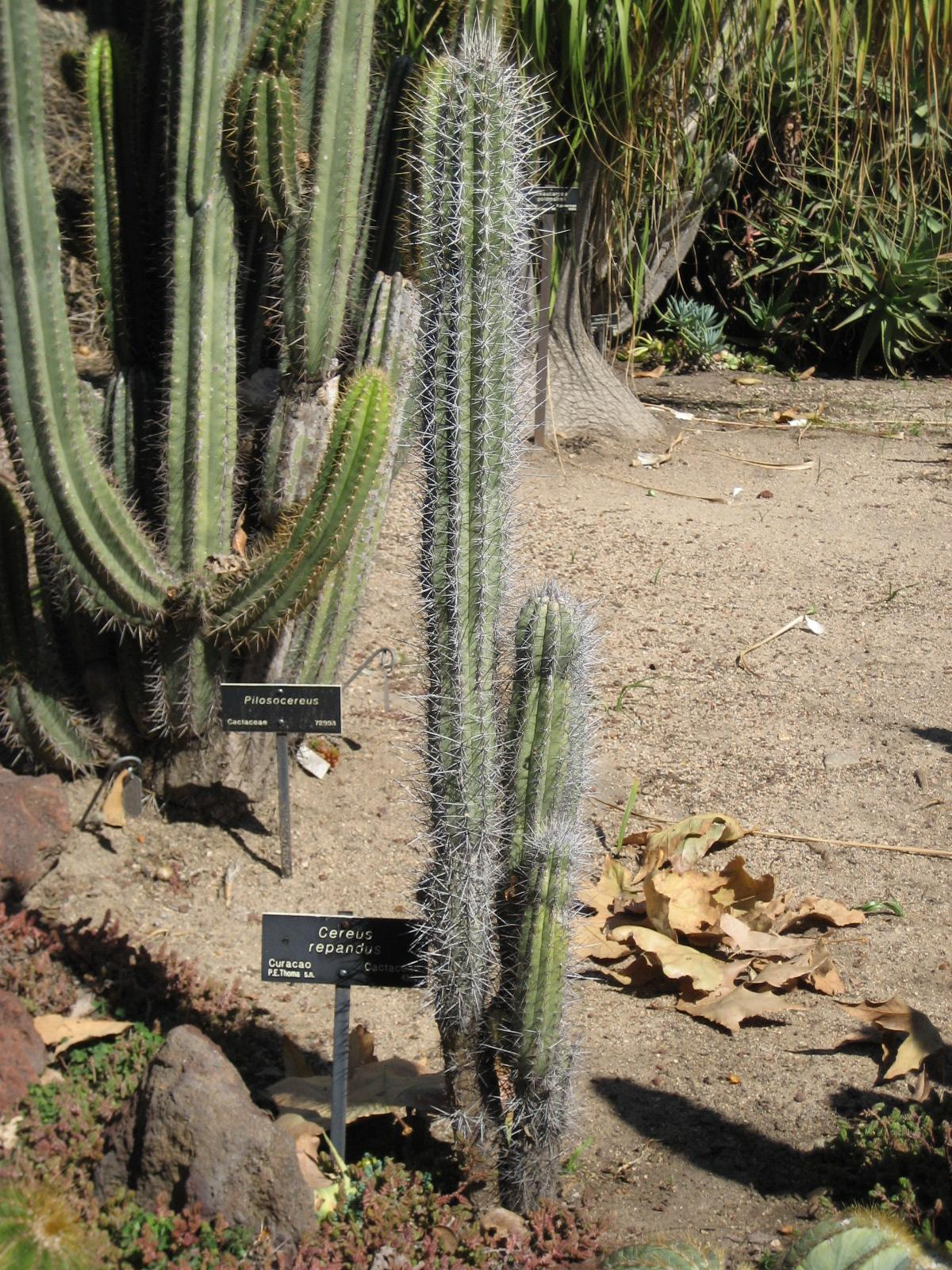
Two ceroid cacti: Cereus repandus with a Pilosocereus in the background

The term ceroid cactus (or sometimes just cereus) is used to describe any of the species of cacti with very elongated bodies, including columnar growth cacti and epiphytic cacti. The name is from the Latin cēreus, meaning "wax taper (a slender candle)", referring to the stiff, upright form of the columnar species. Some species of ceroid cacti were known as torch cactus or torch-thistle, supposedly due to their use as torches by Native Americans in the past.

The genus Cereus was first genus for such cacti and one of the oldest cactus genera. Its circumscription varies depending on the authority.

According to Cactiguide, the word cereus was commonly and freely used to describe any tree-like cacti, although this general use of the word is regarded as misleading, and the word ceroid or ceriform is preferred.

== Taxonomy ==
The name cereus originates in a book by Tabernaemontanus published in 1625 and refers to the candle-like form of species Cereus hexagonus. Regularly having been described by Philip Miller in 1754, and included all known cacti with very elongated bodies.

Ludwig Pfeiffer in 1838 divided Cephalocereus (type Cephalocereus senilis), the name is derived from the Greek κεφαλή (kephalē), head, thus headed cereus, referring to the hairy pseudocephalium. Charles Lemaire described Pilocereus in 1839, now is renamed as Pilosocereus. The name Pilocereus is derived from the Greek pilos, felted, hairy, thus hairy cereus, similar to the Latin pilosus, from which the name Pilosocereus was derived. Genus Echinocereus (type Echinocereus viridiflorus) was described in 1848 by George Engelmann, the name is derived from the Greek echinos, hedgehog or sea urchin. Britton & Rose (1919–1923) and Alwin Berger (1929) continued to divide Cereus into many genera.

In 1984 a new approach to cactus classification was begun. The International Organization for Succulent Plant Study (IOS) founded a working group called the International Cactaceae Systematics Group. The group has recruited specialists in morphology and anatomy and experts in botanical research as electron microscopy, pollen studies, chromosomes, chemistry, and DNA analysis. Specialists in various groups of cacti have been included, or their comments solicited. The results were presented by Anderson 2001.

== Selected species ==
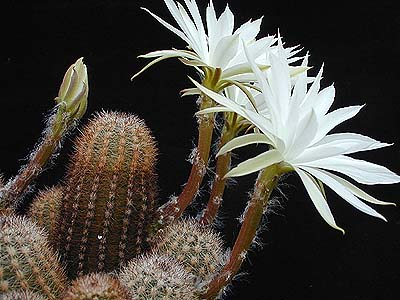
Pygmaeocereus bylesianus

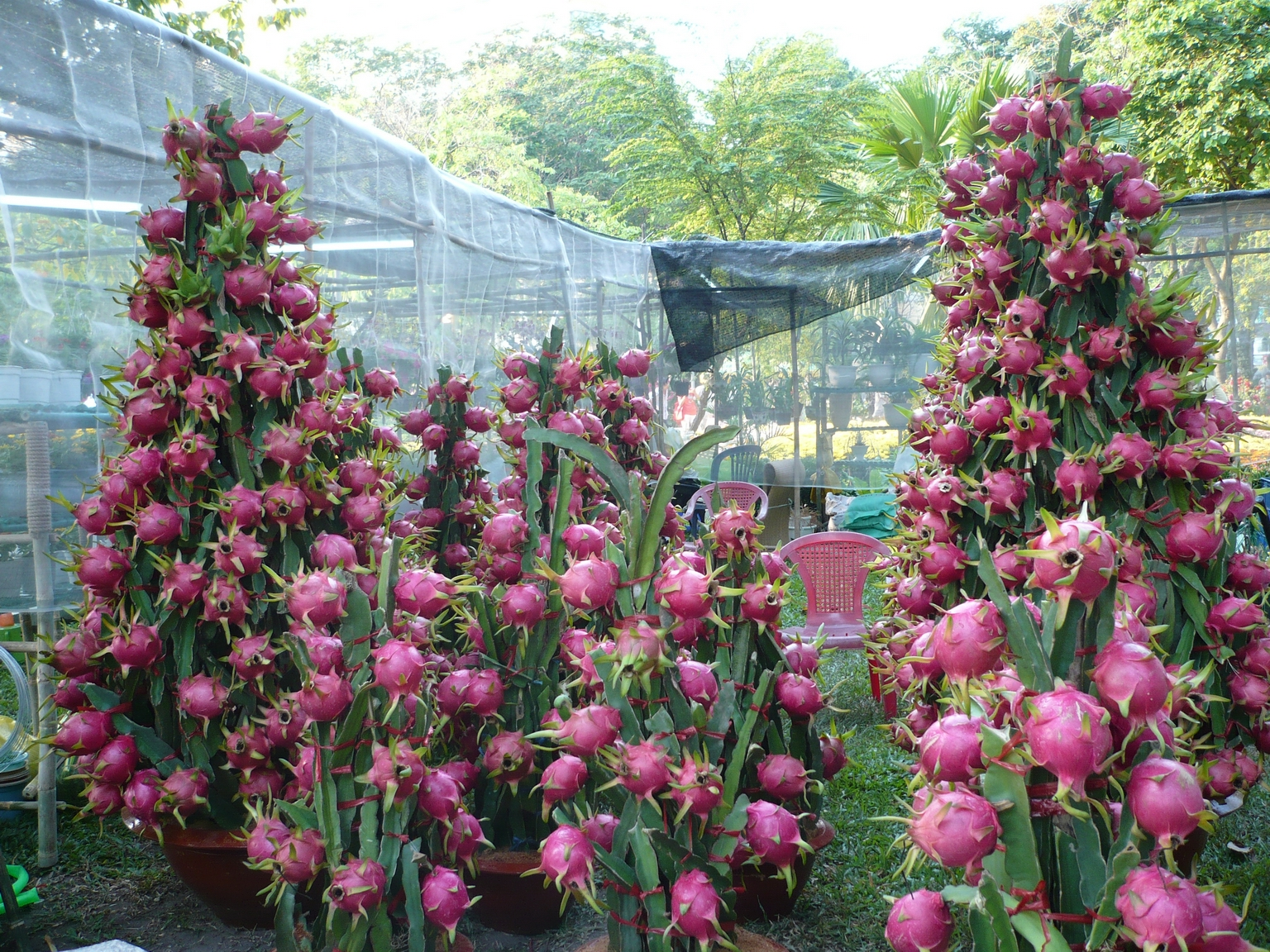
Hylocereus undatus pitahaya

Smallest: Pygmaeocereus, Echinopsis chamaecereus (synonymum Chamaecereus silvestrii), Echinopsis (Seti-Echinopsis) mirabilis, small species of Echinocereus: E. knippelianus, E. laui, E. ledingii, E. pulchellus, E. viridiflorus.
Highest: Carnegia gigantea (18 –20 m, max. 24 m), Neobuxbaumia, Neoraimondia, Pachycereus (synonymum Mitrocereus) (12 – 18 m).
Longest stem: epiphytic Hylocereus undatus (90 m).

Edible fruits: Carnegia, Myrtillocactus geometrizans, Pachycereus pringlei, Pachycereus schottii, Echinocereus: E. fendleri, E. engelmannii and other species, Corryocactus pulquiensis, Selenicereus setaceus, Peniocereus serpentinus, Cereus repandus „cadushi“, Stenocereus: S. fricii, S. griseus, S. queretaroensis, and S. stellatus also cultivated, S. pruinosus and S. thurberi wild.
Pitahaya: red pitahaya Hylocereus undatus, yellow pitahaya H. triangularis. Widely cultivated.
Peniocereus greggii develops a large subterranean root that may be baked, peeled, and eaten.

Cactus fences: Pachycereus marginatus, Cereus repandus.

Firewood: Cereus repandus, Eulychnia sp.

Fishhooks: Neoraimondia arequipensis.
Fishing: Senocereus gummosus contains several toxic triterpenes. Indigenous people in northern Mexico crush the stems of the plant and throw the pieces into the water, stupefying the fish, which are then scooped out of the water by hand.

Hairbrushes: Part of fruits Pachycereus pecten-aboriginum.

Neoraimondia arequipensis is a Peruvian cereus reported to be used as an ingredient in the psychoactive drink called cimora, drunk at various ceremonies and containing material of the San Pedro cactus as well.
