= Monvillea amazonica =

Scientific classification
- Kingdom: Plantae
- Clade: Tracheophytes
- Clade: Angiosperms
- Clade: Eudicots
- Order: Caryophyllales
- Family: Cactaceae
- Subfamily: Cactoideae
- Genus: Monvillea
- Species: M. amazonica

Binomial name
- Monvillea amazonica (K.Schum.) Britton & Rose

Synonyms
- Cereus amazonicus K.Schum.; Cereus apoloensis (Cárdenas) P.J.Braun & Esteves; Cereus ballivianii (Cárdenas) P.J.Braun & Esteves; Monvillea apoloensis Cárdenas; Monvillea ballivianii Cárdenas; Praecereus amazonicus (K.Schum.) Buxb.; Praecereus apoloensis (Cárdenas) Buxb.; Praecereus euchlorus subsp. amazonicus (K.Schum.) N.P.Taylor

Species of cactus

Monvillea amazonica is a species of cactus (family Cactaceae) found in Peru and Bolivia.

== Description ==
Monvillea amazonica is at first erect, many meters long, and minimally branched. Stems have 7 acute ribs and areoles are 17 mm (0.67 in) long. Each areole has about 15 weak spines that are 8 mm (0.31 in) long. The floriferous region is on the upper part of the stem but not at the tip. Flowers are straight and are also 8 cm (3.1 in) long. The fruit is oblong and capped by the withering flower.
