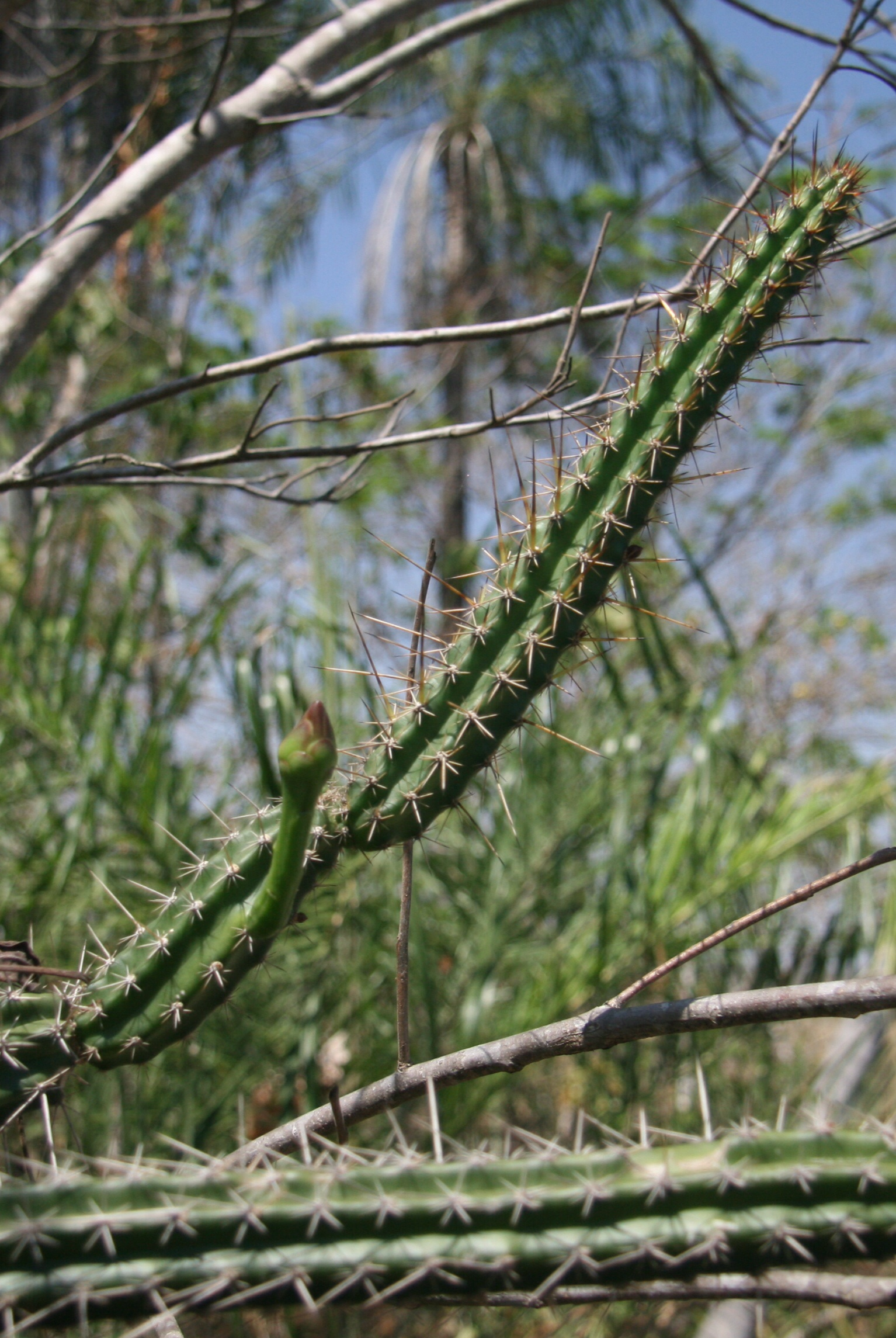

Conservation status
- Least Concern (IUCN 3.1)

Scientific classification
- Kingdom: Plantae
- Clade: Tracheophytes
- Clade: Angiosperms
- Clade: Eudicots
- Order: Caryophyllales
- Family: Cactaceae
- Subfamily: Cactoideae
- Genus: Monvillea
- Species: M. saxicola

Binomial name
- Monvillea saxicola (Morong) A.Berger

Synonyms
- Cereus callianthus (Fuaux & Backeb.) P.J.Braun & Esteves, not validly publ.; Cereus cavendishii Monv.; Cereus euchlorus subsp. rhodoleucanthus (K.Schum.) P.J.Braun & Esteves; Cereus paxtonianus J.F.Cels; Cereus rhodoleucanthus K.Schum.; Cereus ritteri P.J.Braun & Esteves; Cereus ritteri subsp. parpaetiensis (F.Ritter) P.J.Braun & Esteves; Cereus saxicola Morong; Cereus saxicola var. anguiniformis Riccob.; Eriocereus cavendishii (Monv.) Riccob.; Monvillea calliantha Fuaux & Backeb.; Monvillea cavendishii (Monv.) Britton & Rose; Monvillea chacoana F.Ritter; Monvillea krapovickiana R.Kiesling; Monvillea parpaetiensis F.Ritter; Monvillea paxtoniana (F.Cels) Borg; Monvillea paxtoniana var. borealis F.Ritter; Monvillea rhodoleucantha (K.Schum.) A.Berger; Praecereus saxicola (Morong) N.P.Taylor

= Monvillea saxicola =

Species of cactus

Monvillea saxicola is a flowering plant in the cactus family Cactaceae that is found in Bolivia, Argentina and Paraguay.

== Description ==
Monvillea saxicola grows shrubby with sparsely to well branched, upright to spreading, blue green stems of 1.5 to 3 centimeters in diameter. There are 6 to 9 ribs available. The 1 to 5 needle-like middle spines are up to 1.5 inches long. The 6 to 9 needles are white and have a black tip. They are 2 to 6 millimeters long.

The greenish-white flowers are up to 12 centimeters long. The fruits have diameters of up to 3 centimeters.

== Taxonomy ==
The first description as Cereus saxicola was published in 1893 by Thomas Morong. The specific epithet saxicola is derived from the Latin words saxum for 'rock' and -cola for '-dwelling' and refers to the rocky habitat of the species. Nigel Paul Taylor placed the species in the genus Praecereus in 1997. Taxonomic synonyms include Cereus cavendishii and Cereus rhodoleucanthus. As of November 2025, Monvillea saxicola is the currently accepted name in Plants of the World Online.

== Distribution ==
Monvillea saxicola is widespread in southwestern Brazil and northeastern Argentina at altitudes of 300 to 900 meters. It is also found in Paraguay.
