= Nyctocereus =

Conservation status
- Least Concern (IUCN 3.1)

Scientific classification
- Kingdom: Plantae
- Clade: Tracheophytes
- Clade: Angiosperms
- Clade: Eudicots
- Order: Caryophyllales
- Family: Cactaceae
- Subfamily: Cactoideae
- Tribe: Echinocereeae
- Genus: Nyctocereus (A.Berger) Britton & Rose
- Species: N. serpentinus

Binomial name
- Nyctocereus serpentinus (Lag. & Rodr.) Britton & Rose
- It is endemic to Mexico

Synonyms
- List: Cactus serpentinus Lag. & Rodr.; Cereaster serpentinus (Lag. & Rodr.) F.Berge; Cereus serpentinus (Lag. & Rodr.) DC.; Echinocereus serpentinus (Lag. & Rodr.) Lem.; Peniocereus serpentinus (Lag. & Rodr.) N.P.Taylor; Cactus ambiguus Bonpl.; Cereus ambiguus (Bonpl.) DC.; Cereus ambiguus var. strictior Weing.; Cereus kalbreyerianus Wercklé; Cereus serpentinus var. splendens Salm-Dyck ex Lem.; Cereus splendens Salm-Dyck; Echinocereus splendens (Salm-Dyck) Lem.; Nyctocereus castellanosii Scheinvar; Nyctocereus kalbreyerianus (Wercklé) Croizat; Nyctocereus serpentinus var. ambiguus (Bonpl.) Borg; Nyctocereus serpentinus var. pietatis Bravo; Nyctocereus serpentinus subsp. splendens (Salm-Dyck ex Lem.) Scheinvar; Nyctocereus serpentinus var. splendens (Salm-Dyck ex Lem.) Borg; Nyctocereus serpentinus var. strictior Borg; Peniocereus castellanosii (Scheinvar) Scheinvar; Peniocereus serpentinus subsp. pietatis (Bravo) Scheinvar

Monotypic genus of cactus

Nyctocereus serpentinus, commonly known as the serpent cactus or, in Spanish, gigante (meaning "giant"), is a species of succulent flowering plant in the family Cactaceae. It is the only species in the monotypic genus Nyctocereus. It is native to Mexico, although it has also been introduced to other regions such as KwaZulu-Natal in eastern South Africa and Queensland and New South Wales in eastern Australia.

== Description ==
Nyctocereus serpentinus is a species of shrubby cactus that often forms thickets of numerous stems, which may be creeping, climbing, or sprawling. The stems are erect or somewhat pendent and grow up to 3 meters in length and 2 to 5 cm in diameter. This species exhibits tuberous roots.

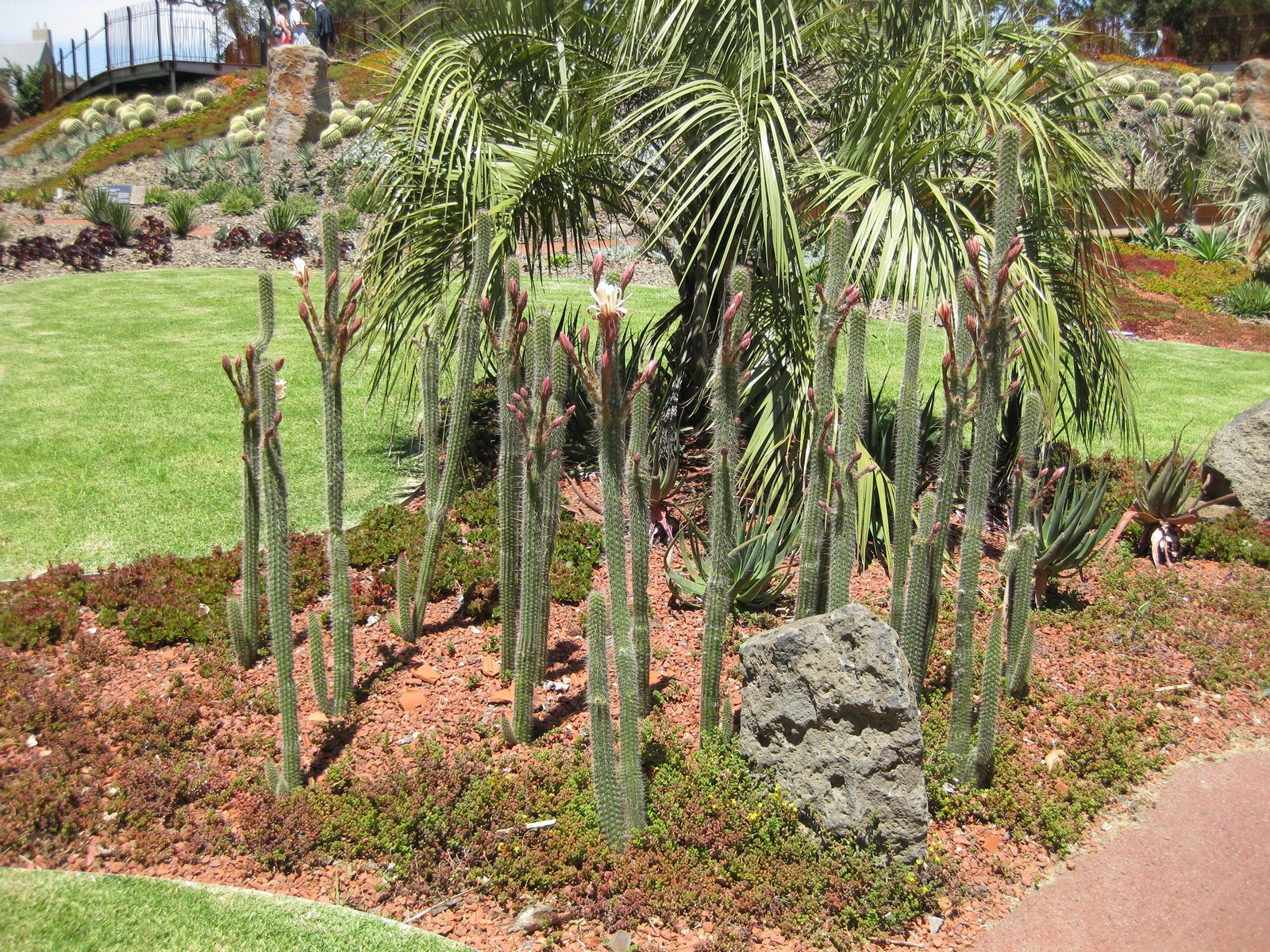
Plants in the Royal Botanic Gardens Victoria, Melbourne, Australia

The stems have 10 to 12 somewhat-rounded ribs, on which are situated areoles; the areoles have 10 to 12 spines each. The spines are off-white to brown in color and darker at the apices; they measure 1 to 3 cm in length.

The flowers open at night. They are funnel-shaped and are white in color with pink tones. They can reach 25 cm in length and 15 cm in diameter. The pericarpel and floral tube have bristles.

Plant in flower

The fruits are globose to ovoid in shape; they measure approximately 4 cm in length, and are red in color. The seeds are black in color and measure approximately 5 mm in length.

== Taxonomy ==
This species was first described as Cactus serpentinus by the Spanish botanists Mariano Lagasca and José Demetrio Rodríguez in 1801.

Later, the American botanists Nathaniel Lord Britton and Joseph Nelson Rose transferred the species to the new monotypic genus Nyctocereus as Nyctocereus serpentinus in 1909.

=== Etymology ===
The genus name Nyctocereus is derived from the Greek term nyx (from the root nykt-, meaning "night"), and the Latin word cereus (meaning "candle"), referring to how the flowers open at night as well as to the candle-like stems. The specific epithet serpentinus is derived from the Latin adjective serpentīnus (meaning "serpentine" or "snake-like"), in reference to the long, thin, snake-like nature of this species' stems.

== Distribution and habitat ==
Nyctocereus serpentinus is native to Mexico, although it has also been introduced to other regions such as KwaZulu-Natal in eastern South Africa and Queensland and New South Wales in eastern Australia. It is mainly found in tropical regions with a significant dry season, where it grows in dry-deciduous tropical forests.

== Conservation ==
On the IUCN Red List, Nyctocereus serpentinus is classified as being of Least Concern (LC) due to its wide range and the absence of significant known threats. However, this species' populations are not very numerous: each subpopulation usually contains approximately 10 to 20 individuals, most of which are adults. Although only locally abundant, the species faces a low risk of extinction.

== Uses ==
=== Cultivation ===
This species is primarily cultivated as an ornamental for its beautiful white flowers which open at night. In Mexico, it is one of the most commonly-grown ornamental cactus species. It is also used occasionally as a grafting stock for other cacti due to its rapid and vigorous growth.

It grows best in a loose substrate which is rich in organic material (for example, from decomposed leaves or other compost) and well-drained. During periods of warm weather, it must be irrigated sufficiently for it to grow well and reach a significant size. It prefers well-lit areas, although it must be protected from intense direct sunlight. It is sensitive to the cold and prefers winter temperatures above 10 ºC (50 ºF), although it can tolerate brief periods down to 0 ºC (32 ºF). Due to this species' rapid growth and long, narrow stems, it should be provided with support. Its semi-erect growth form and its moderate size make it a good choice for gardens, especially in foreground and intermediate areas, or in a pot in a greenhouse. It may be propagated via cuttings.

=== Other uses ===
As well as for its ornamental value, Nyctocereus serpentinus is cultivated for its edible fruit.

== Common names ==
Local common names of this plant in Mexico include the following: cactus serpiente, gigante, junco, junco blanco, junco espinoso, nopal blanco, pitahayita, pitajallo, pitaya, pitayita colorada, reina de la noche, and tasajillo junco espinoso.

== Gallery ==
Plants in habitat in Dolores Hidalgo, Guanajuato, Mexico

Stem

Flower bud

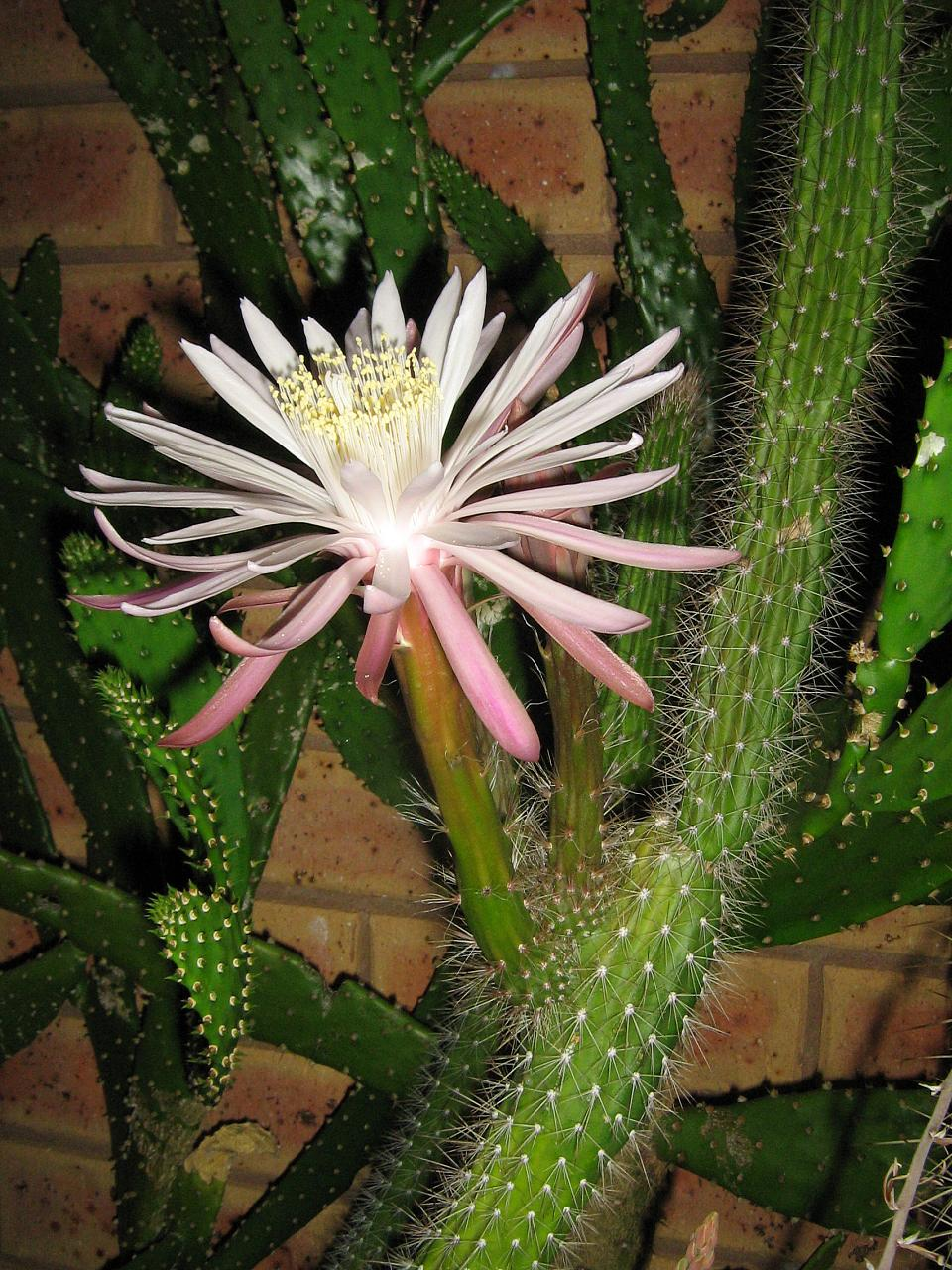
Flower

Developing fruit
