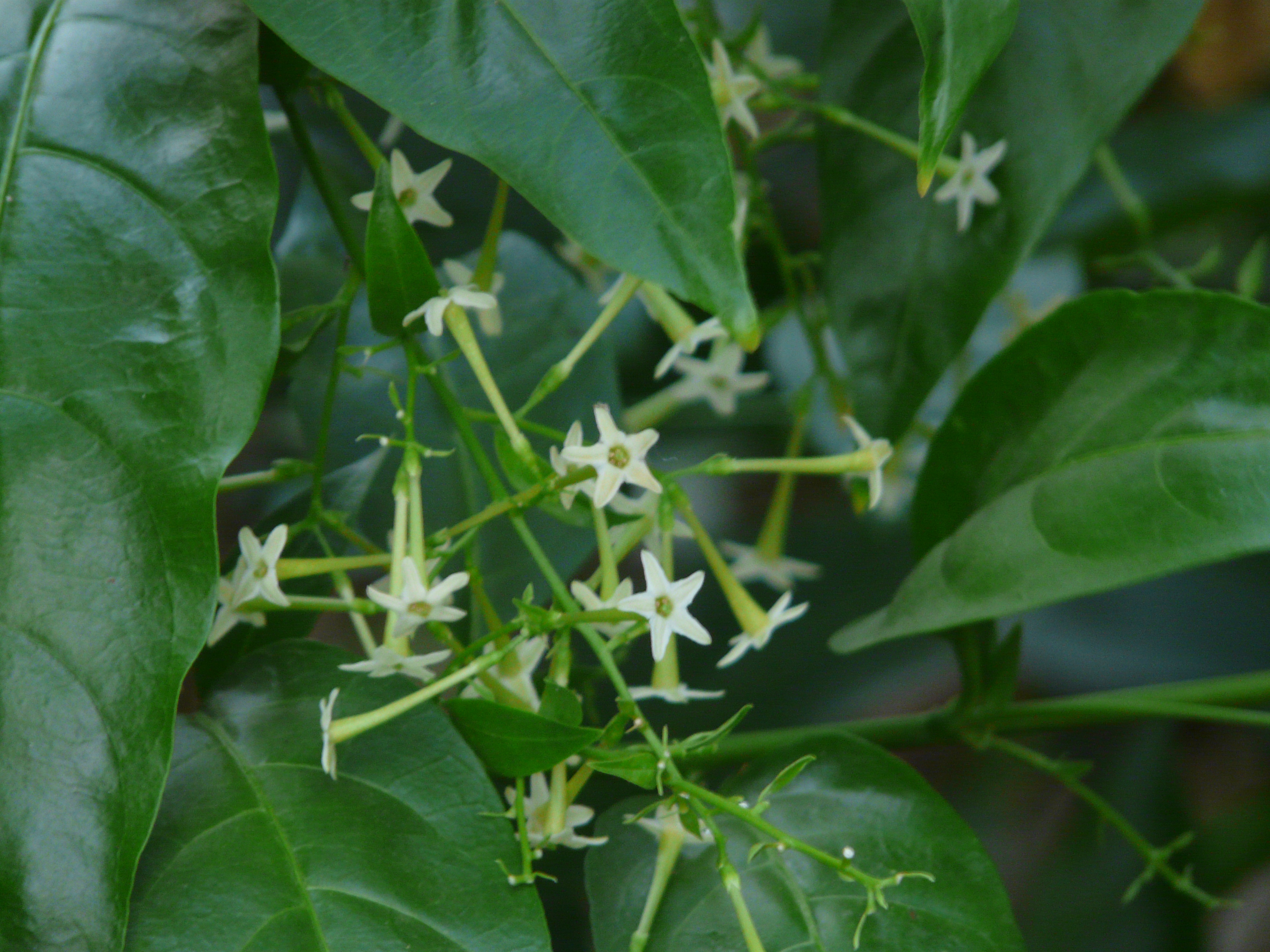

Conservation status
- Least Concern (IUCN 3.1)

Scientific classification
- Kingdom: Plantae
- Clade: Tracheophytes
- Clade: Angiosperms
- Clade: Eudicots
- Clade: Asterids
- Order: Solanales
- Family: Solanaceae
- Genus: Cestrum
- Species: C. nocturnum

Binomial name
- Cestrum nocturnum L.

Synonyms
- List: Chiococca nocturna (L.) Jacq.; Cestrum graciliflorum Dunal; Cestrum leucocarpum Dunal; Cestrum multiflorum Roem. & Schult.; Cestrum propinquum M.Martens & Galeotti; Cestrum scandens Thibaud ex Dunal; Cestrum spicatum Mill.; Cestrum suberosum Jacq.

= Cestrum nocturnum =

Species of flowering plant

Cestrum nocturnum, the lady of the night, night-blooming jasmine, night-blooming jessamine, night-scented jessamine, night-scented cestrum, or poisonberry,( Urdu: رات کی رانی, romanized: raat ki rani ) is a species of plant in the potato family Solanaceae. It is native to Mexico, Central America and northern South America and is naturalized in South Asia.

Despite its common name, the species is not a "true jasmine" and not of the genus Jasminum.

== Description ==
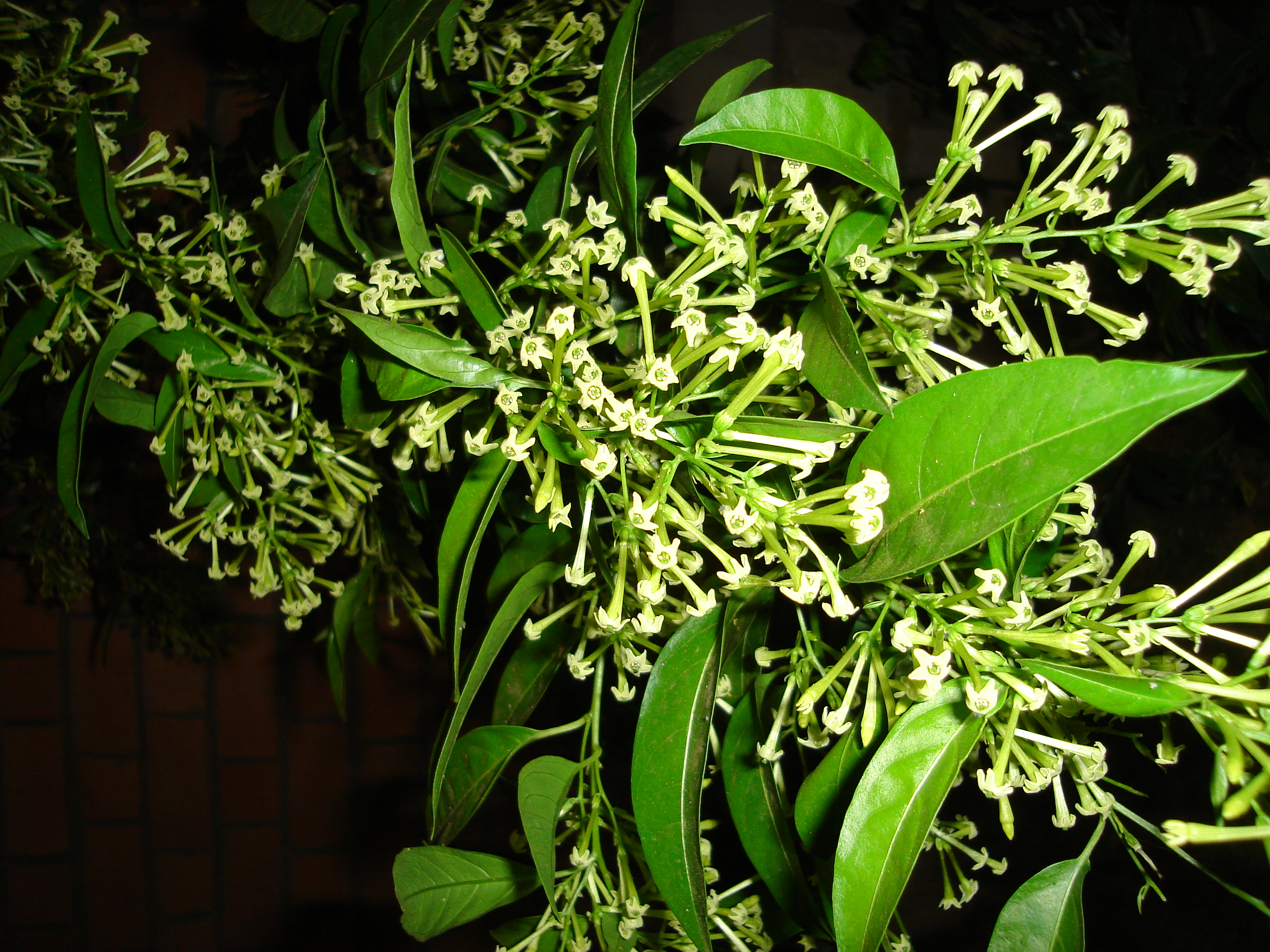
Leaves and flowers

Cestrum nocturnum is an evergreen woody shrub with slender branches growing to 4 m (13 ft) tall. The plant is multi-branched and heavily foliated. The leaves are simple, narrow lanceolate, 6–20 cm (2.4–7.9 in) long and 2–4.5 cm (0.79–1.77 in) broad, smooth and glossy, with an entire margin. Towards the front they are pointed or tapered, the base is rounded or blunt. The leaf stalks are 0.8 to 2 cm long.

=== Inflorescences ===
The flowers are greenish-white, with a slender tubular corolla 2–2.5 cm (0.79–0.98 in) long with five acute lobes, 10–13 mm (0.39–0.51 in) diameter when open at night, and are produced in cymose inflorescences. A powerful, sweet perfume is released at night. The mostly multi-flowered, drooping inflorescences are terminal or axillary. They are clustered, sparsely branched panicles, on the inflorescence axes of which there are herbaceous bracts. The five sepals are fused to form a bell-shaped, approximately 2 mm long calyx and have five pointed tips, which are slightly enlarged, ribbed and acutely pointed on the fruit. The inside and outside of the calyx are finely haired.

The fruit is a white berry 10 millimetres (0.39 in) long by 5 mm (0.20 in) diameter. There is also a variety with yellowish flowers. There are mixed reports regarding the toxicity of foliage and fruit.

The Latin specific epithet, nocturnum, means 'at night' and is a reference to the plant's habit of blooming at night.

== Cultivation ==
Cestrum nocturnum is grown in subtropical regions as an ornamental plant for its flowers that are heavily perfumed at night. It grows best in average to moist soil that is light and sandy with a neutral pH of 6.6 to 7.5, and is hardy to hardiness zone 8. C. nocturnum can be fertilized biweekly with a weak dilution of seaweed and fish emulsion fertilizer.

== Chemistry ==
Flowers distilled oil contains phenylethyl alcohol (27%), benzyl alcohol (12%), eicosane (5.6%), eugenol (5.6%), n-tetracosane (4.4%), caryophyllene oxide (3.1%), 1-hexadecanol (2.7%), methoxyeugenol (2.45%), benzaldehyde (2.32%). Flowers alcohol extract contains cytotoxic steroids.

== Pharmacology ==
=== Toxicity ===
Ingestion of C. nocturnum has not been well documented, but there is some reason to believe that caution is in order. All members of the family Solanaceae contain an alkaloid toxin called solanine, though some members of the family are routinely eaten without ill-effect. The most commonly reported problems associated with C. nocturnum are respiratory problems from the scent, and feverish symptoms following ingestion.

Some people, especially those with respiratory sensitivities or asthma, have reported difficulty breathing, irritation of the nose and throat, headache, nausea, or other symptoms when exposed to the blossom's powerful scent. Some Cestrum species contain chlorogenic acid, and the presence of this potent sensitizer may be responsible for this effect in C. nocturnum.

Some plant guides describe C. nocturnum as "toxic" and warn that ingesting plant parts, especially fruit, may result in elevated temperature, rapid pulse, excess salivation and gastritis.

Spoerke and Smolinske (1990) noted the following: "Ingesting 15 lb of plant material caused a cow to salivate, clamp its jaws, collapse, and eventually die. A postmortem showed gastroenteritis and congestion of liver, kidneys, brain, and spinal cord. Although the berries and the sap are suspected of being toxic, several cases of ingestion of the berries have not shown them to be a problem, with one exception. Morton cites two cases where children ate significant quantities (handfuls) of berries and had no significant effects and another two where berries were ingested in smaller amounts, with similar negative results", and in a new paragraph noted that "Ingestion of green berries over several weeks by a 2-year-old child resulted in diarrhea, vomiting, and blood clots in the stool. Anemia and purpura [discoloration of the skin caused by subcutaneous bleeding] were also noted. A solanine alkaloid isolated from the stool was hemolytic to human erythrocytes."

Plant extracts have shown larvicidal activity against the mosquito Aedes aegypti while showing no toxicity to fish. Plant extracts cause hematological changes in the freshwater fish when exposed to sub lethal concentrations.

=== Psychoactivity ===
The mechanisms of the plant's putative psychoactive effects are currently unknown, and anecdotal data are extremely limited and include an aphrodisiac power. In a rare discussion of traditional entheogenic use of the plant, Müller-Ebeling, Rätsch, and Shahi describe shamanic use of C. nocturnum in Nepal. They describe experiencing "trippy" effects without mentioning unpleasant physical side effects. Rätsch's Encyclopedia of Psychoactive Plants also describes a handful of reports of ingestion of the plant without mentioning serious adverse side effects.

== Invasive potential ==
Cestrum nocturnum has become widely naturalized in tropical and subtropical regions throughout the world, including Australia, New Zealand, South Africa, southern China and the southernmost United States, and is difficult to eradicate. It is classed as a weed in some countries.

In Auckland, New Zealand, it has been reported as a seriously invasive weed to the Auckland Regional Council and is under investigation. NS Forest and Bird is compiling an inventory of wild cestrum sites in order to place the plant on the banned list. The inventory can be viewed via Google Maps. Some nurseries still sell it without warning customers of the dangers to native bush reserves.

== In culture ==
The inscription on American filmmaker David Lynch's gravestone at the Hollywood Forever Cemetery reads "Night Blooming Jasmine."

Rapper fakemink released a song titled "Night, Blooming Jasmine ." on 17 April 2026, as the lead single for his album Terrified.

== Gallery ==
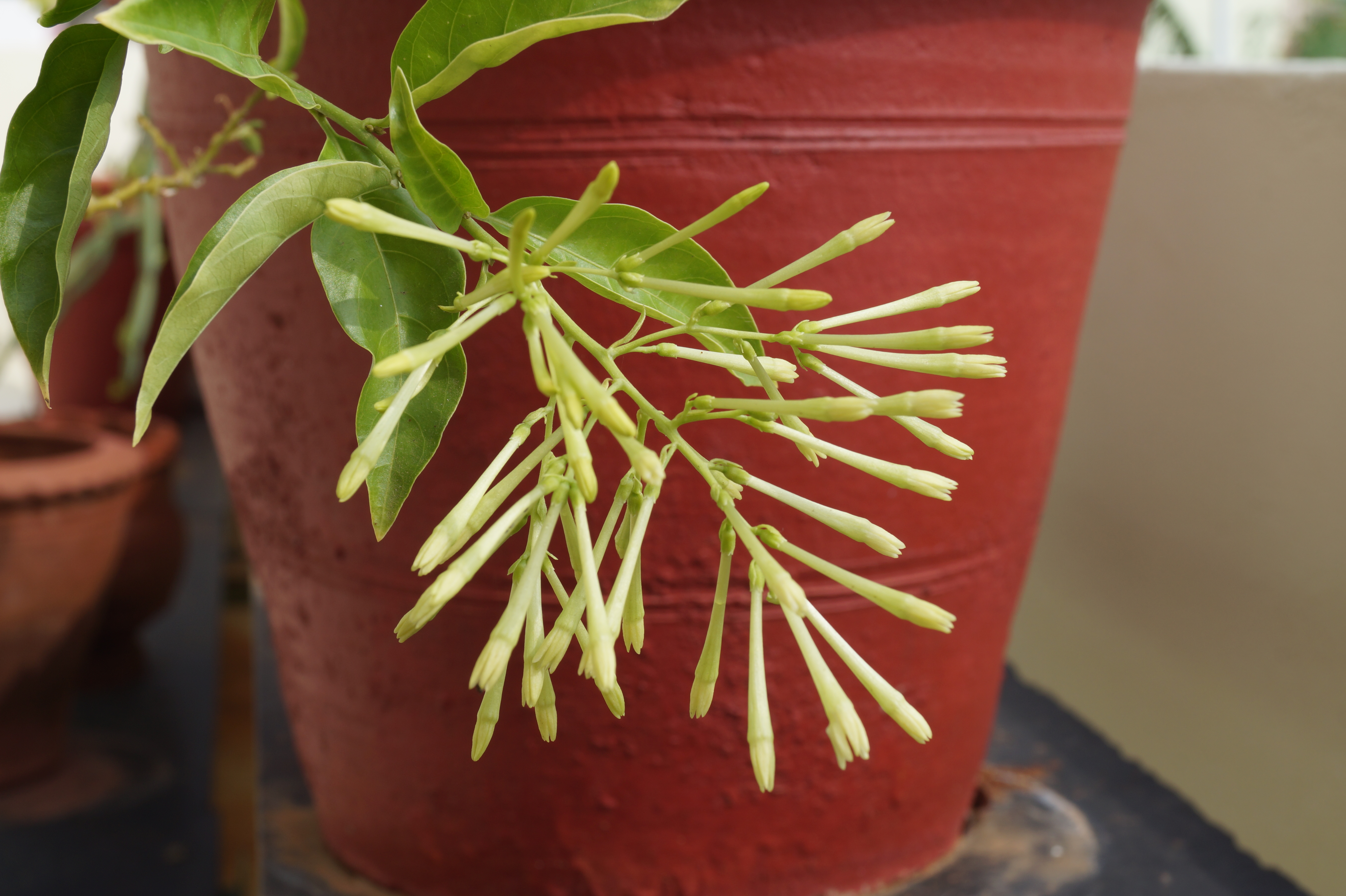
Cestrum nocturnum buds

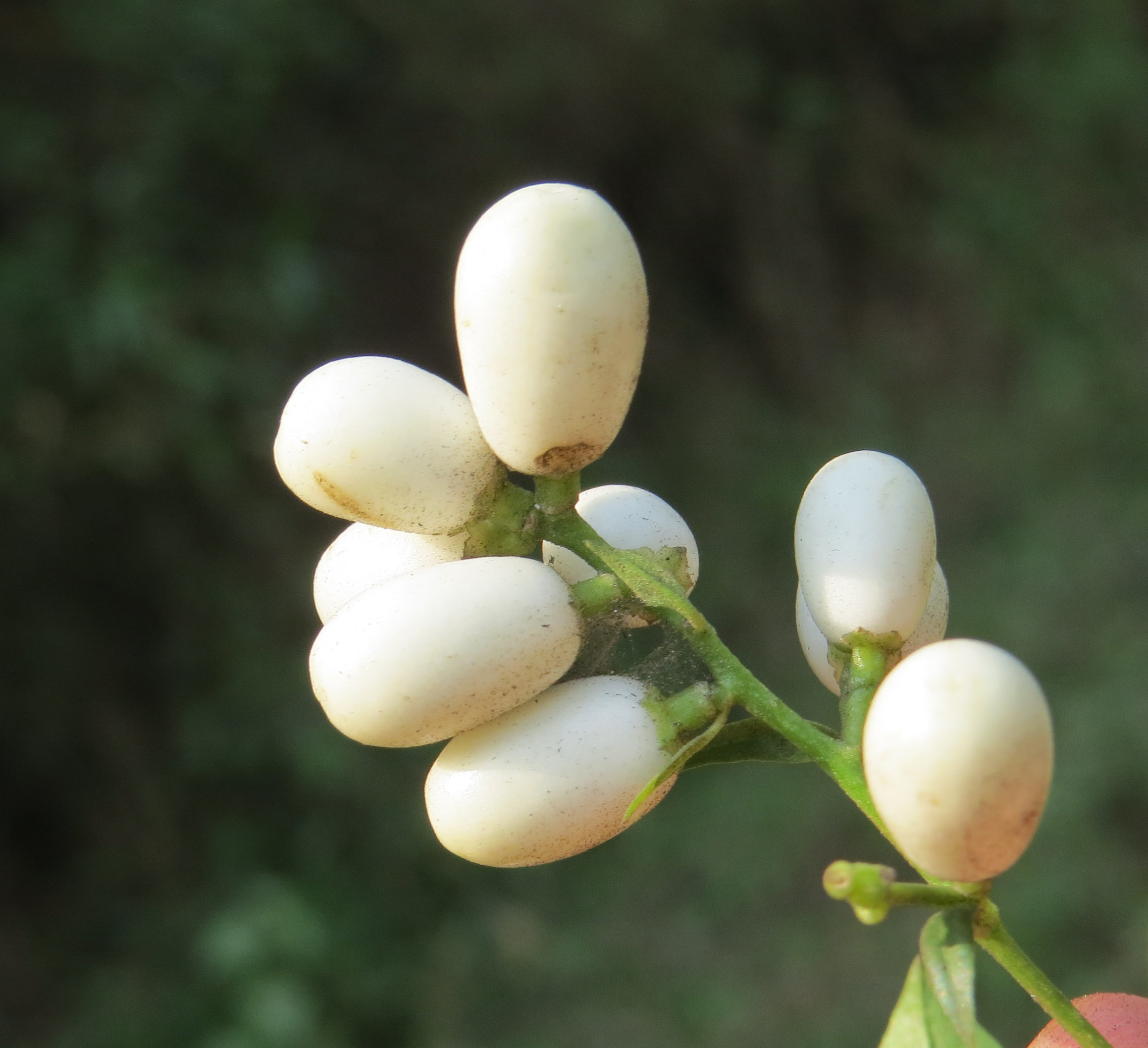
Cestrum nocturnum fruit

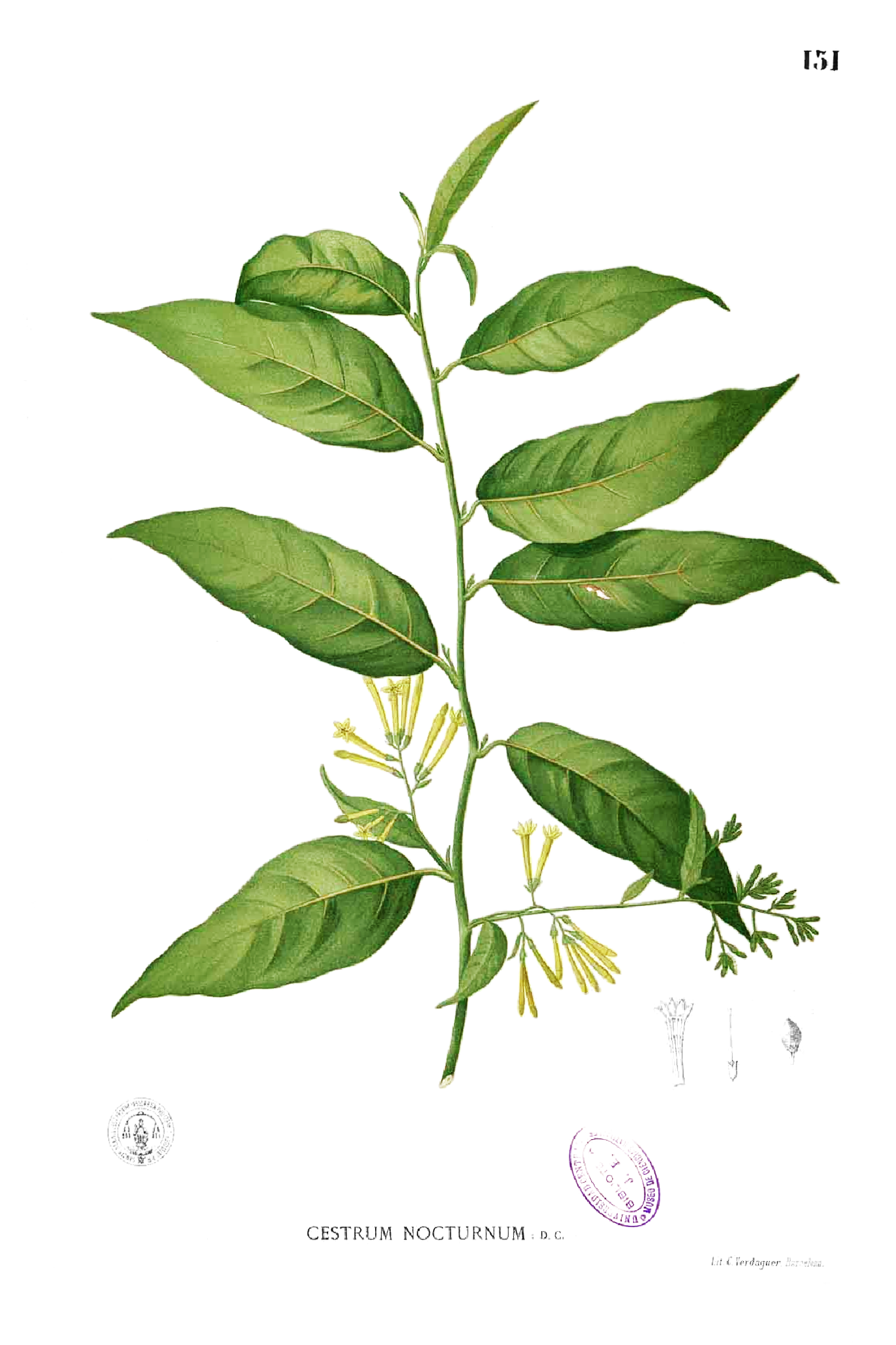

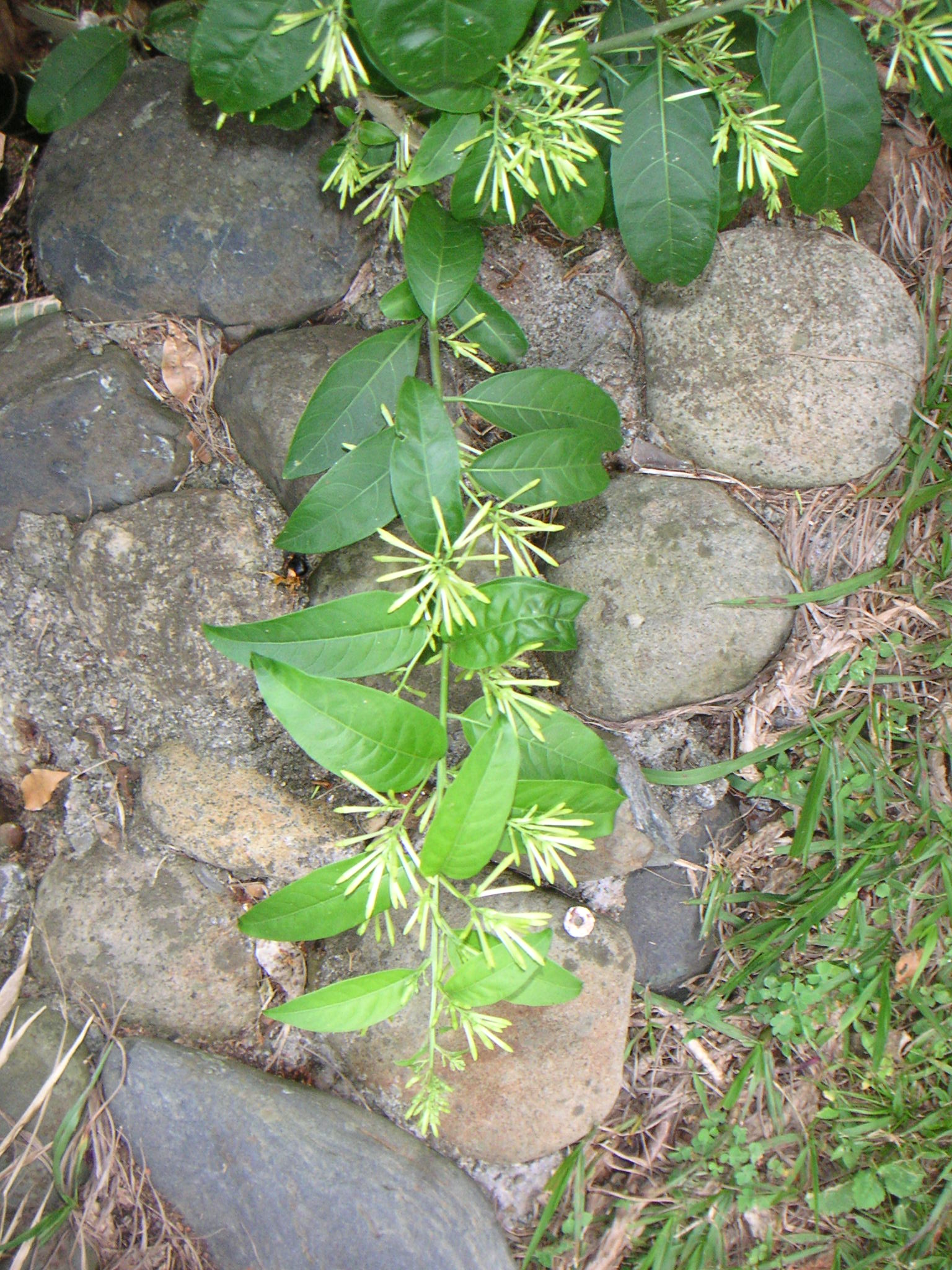

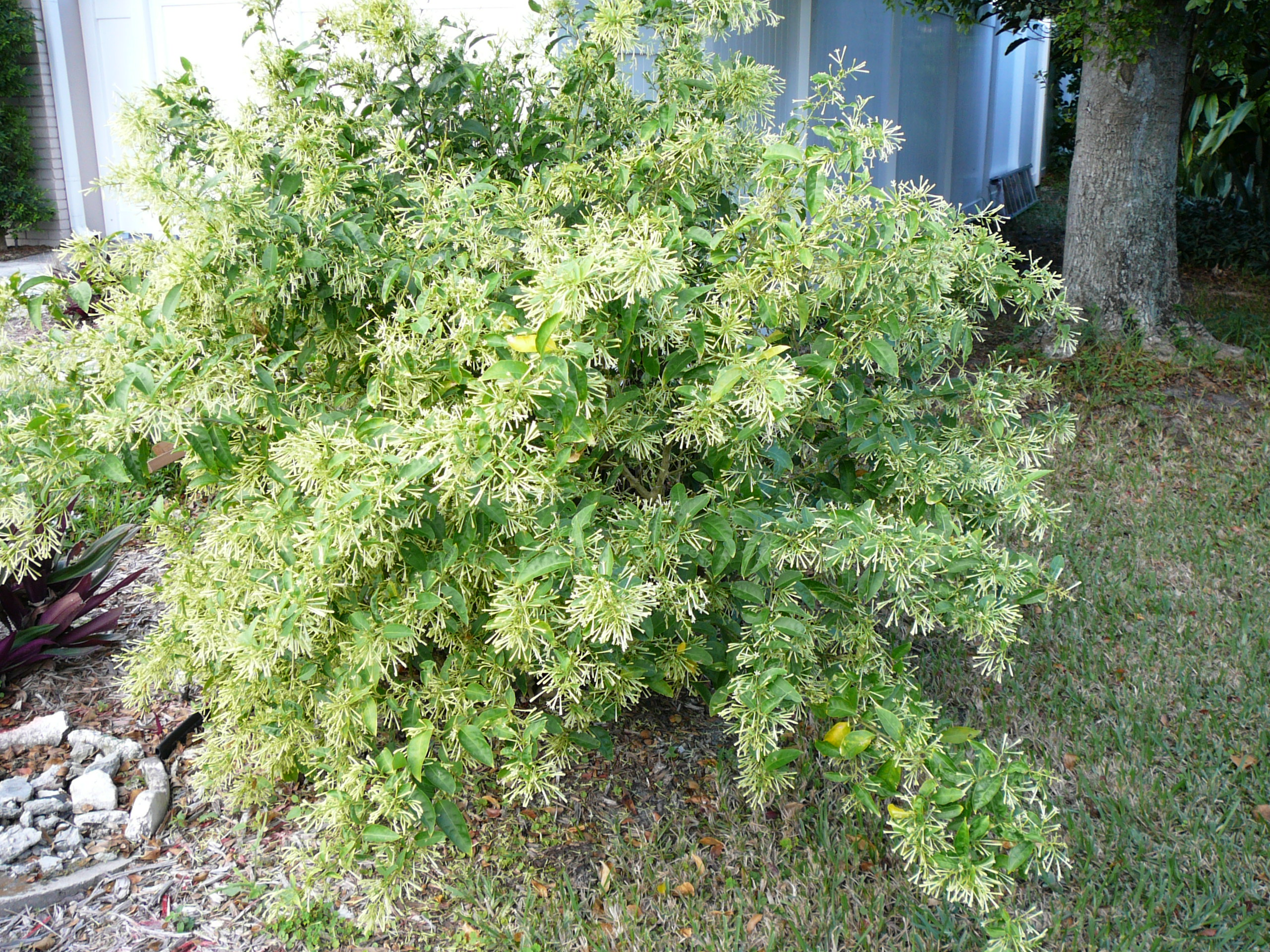

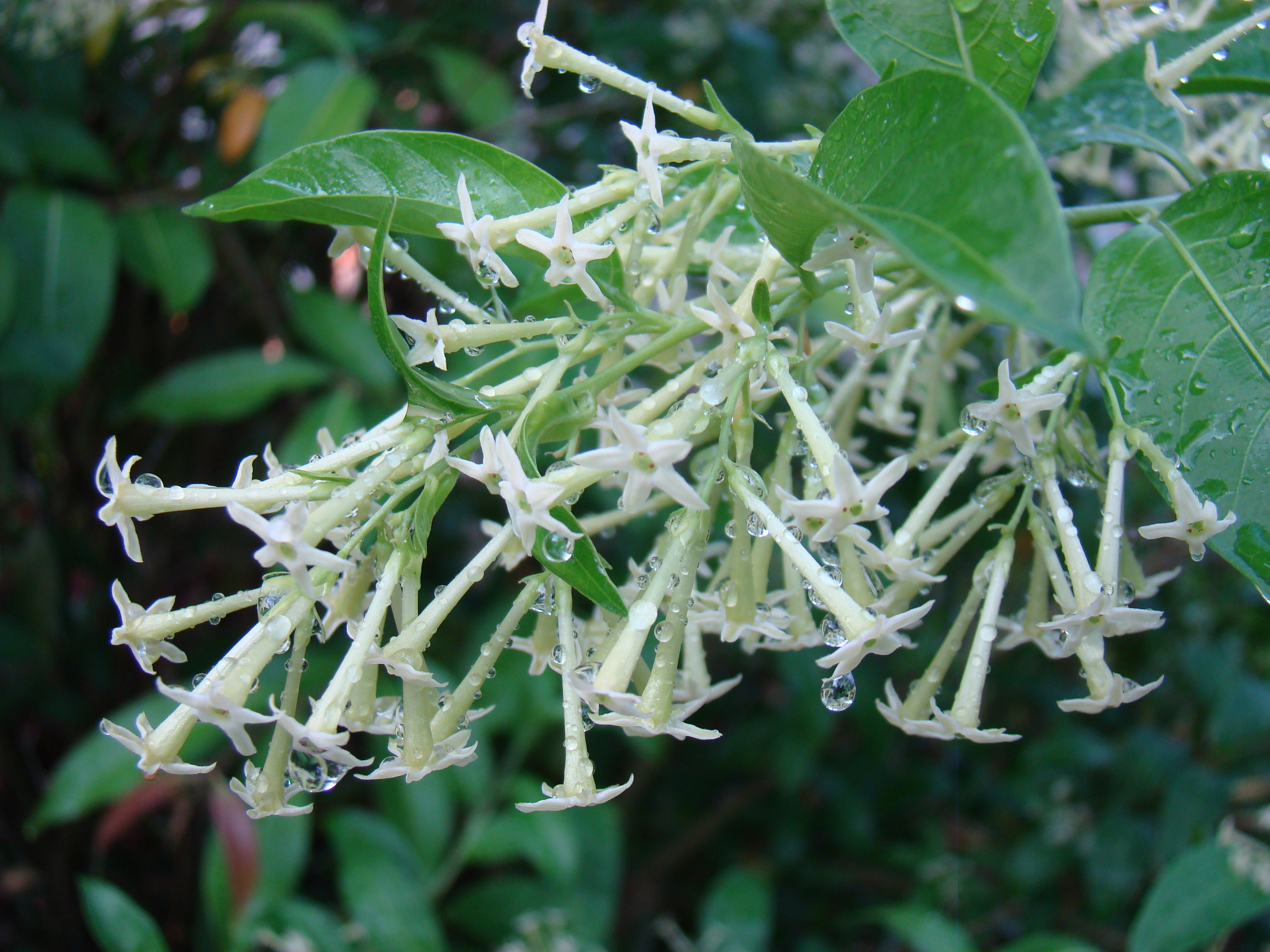

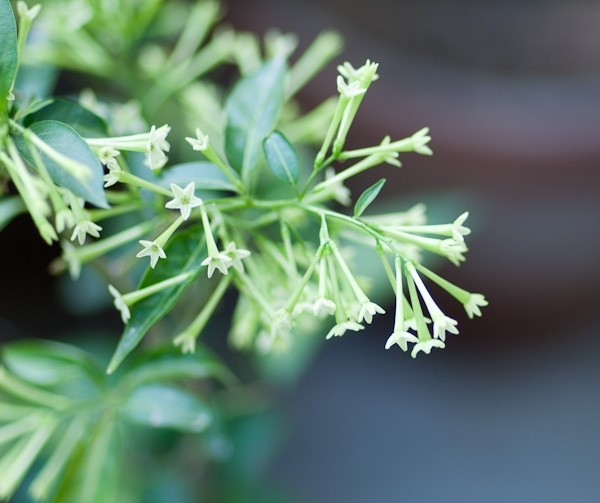
