= K. Ludwig Pfeiffer =

German scholar in literary, media and cultural studies

K. Ludwig Pfeiffer (born February 23, 1944 in Neustadt an der Aisch, Middle Franconia, Germany) is a German scholar in literary, media and cultural studies. Besides his own publications, he is the editor and co-editor of 14 volumes in various research disciplines. He has also published about 150 scholarly articles on important topics in the humanities.

== Life and development ==
From 1963 to 1967 he studied philosophy, English and French literature and language at Würzburg University to which he added German literature after his first state exam in 1967 (second state exam in 1969). Again at Würzburg University in 1973, he took his PhD with a dissertation on the problems of literary interpretation, adopting and adapting perspectives of the theory of language and philosophy of science. In 1977, he took his Habilitation at Konstanz University with a book written from the point of view of a theory of consciousness, on the functional history of the 19th century English novel, especially the novels of George Meredith. Pfeiffer’s scholarly development is marked by the adjustment and relocation of literary studies in broader media and cultural contexts. These, in turn, are re-examined in anthropological terms.

In 1978, he became Professor of English at the Ruhr University Bochum, and in 1979 Professor of English and Comparative Literature at the University of Siegen (Professor Emeritus as of 2009). Since 2007 he has been at Jacobs University Bremen (Professor Emeritus as of end of 2011). As (distinguished) visiting professor and Fellow he has taught and pursued research at US-American (amongst others Harvard and Stanford Universities, the University of California, Irvine and Santa Cruz), Japanese, Brazilian and German universities.

== Publications ==
- Sprachtheorie, Wissenschaftstheorie und das Problem der Textinterpretation. Amsterdam: Rodopi, 1974.
- Wissenschaft als Sujet im modernen englischen Roman. Konstanz: Universitätsverlag, 1979.
- Bilder der Realität und die Realität der Bilder: Verbrauchte Formen in den Romanen George Merediths. Munich: Fink, 1981.
- Das Mediale und das Imaginäre: Dimensionen kulturanthropologischer Medientheorie. Frankfurt/Main: Suhrkamp, 1999. (Hungarian translation 2005)
- The Protoliterary: Steps towards an Anthropology of Culture. Stanford: Stanford University Press, 2002.
- Von der Materialität der Kommunikation zur Medienanthropologie: Aufsätze zur Methodologie der Literatur- und Kulturwissenschaften, 1977-2009. Edited by Ingo Berensmeyer and Nicola Glaubitz. Heidelberg: Carl Winter, 2009.
- Fiktion und Tatsächlichkeit. Momente und Modelle funktionaler Textgeschichte. Hamburg: Shoebox House, 2015.
- From Chaos to Catastrophe? Texts and the Transitionality of the Mind. Berlin: Walter de Gruyter, 2018.
- Das Symposion. Sozialer Zusammenhalt in Geschichte und Literatur. Weilerswist: Velbrück Wissenschaft, 2021.
- Sociability and Society: Literature and the Symposium. Stanford: Stanford University Press, 2023. (Strongly revised version of preceding title)
- Was bleibet aber, stiften die Dichter: Hegel, Beckett und ihre Zumutungen. Würzburg: Königshausen & Neumann, 2024.
