= José Demetrio Rodríguez =

Spanish botanist

José Demetrio Rodríguez (1760–1846) was a Spanish botanist.
