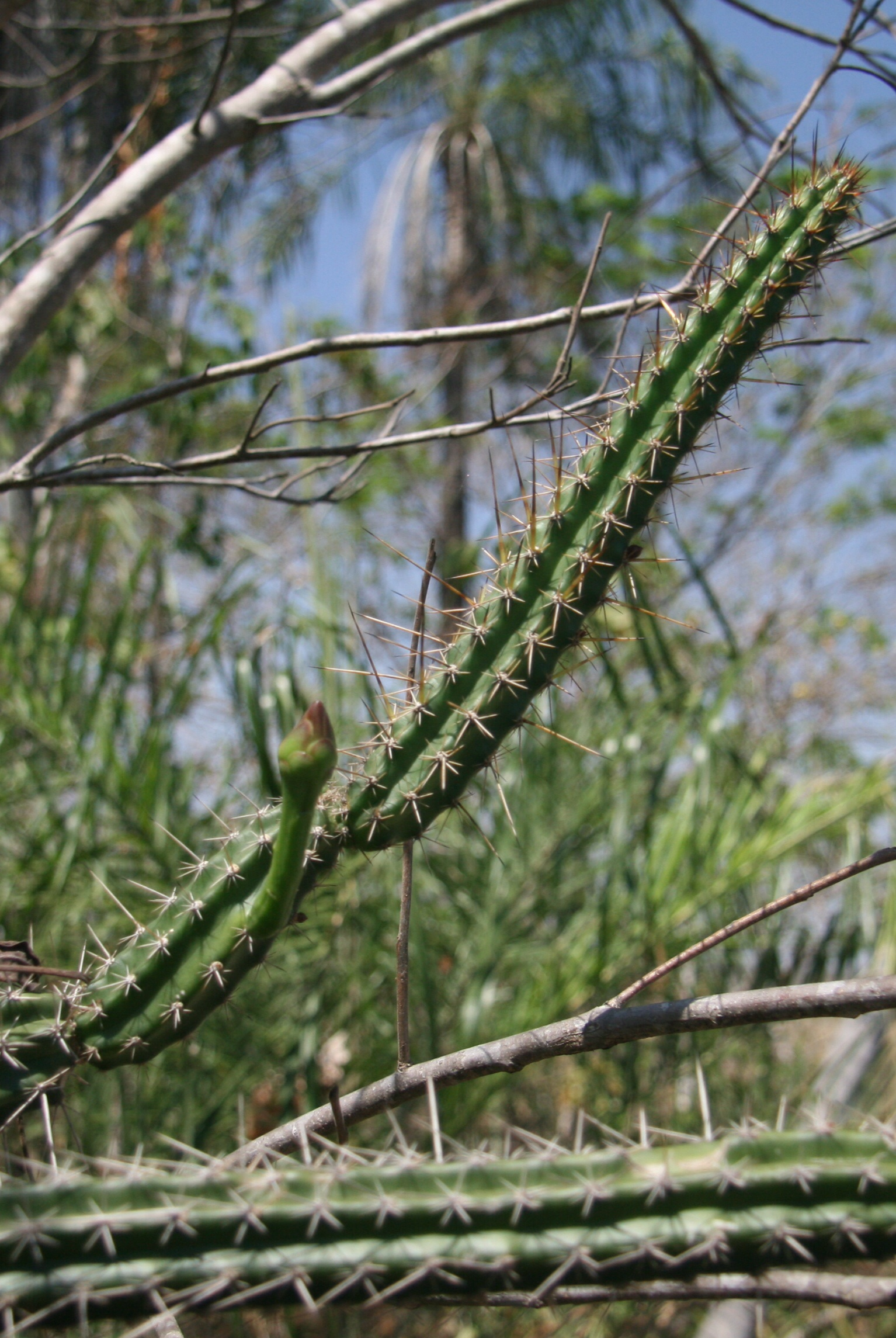
- Monvillea saxicola

Scientific classification
- Kingdom: Plantae
- Clade: Tracheophytes
- Clade: Angiosperms
- Clade: Eudicots
- Order: Caryophyllales
- Family: Cactaceae
- Subfamily: Cactoideae
- Subtribe: Cereinae
- Genus: Monvillea; Britton & Rose

Species
- See text.

Synonyms
- Praecereus Buxb.; × Prillea M.H.J.van der Meer

= Monvillea =

Genus of cacti

Monvillea is a genus of flowering plant in the cactus family Cactaceae, native to South America. The genus was established by Nathaniel Lord Britton and Joseph Nelson Rose in 1920.

== Species ==
As of November 2024, Plants of the World Online accepted the following species:

- Monvillea amazonica (K.Schum.) Britton & Rose
- Monvillea diffusa Britton & Rose
- Monvillea euchlora (F.A.C.Weber ex K.Schum.) Backeb.
- Monvillea jaenensis Rauh & Backeb.
- Monvillea saxicola (Morong) A.Berger
- Monvillea smithiana (Britton & Rose) Backeb.
