= Night-blooming plants =

Flowering pattern of angiosperms

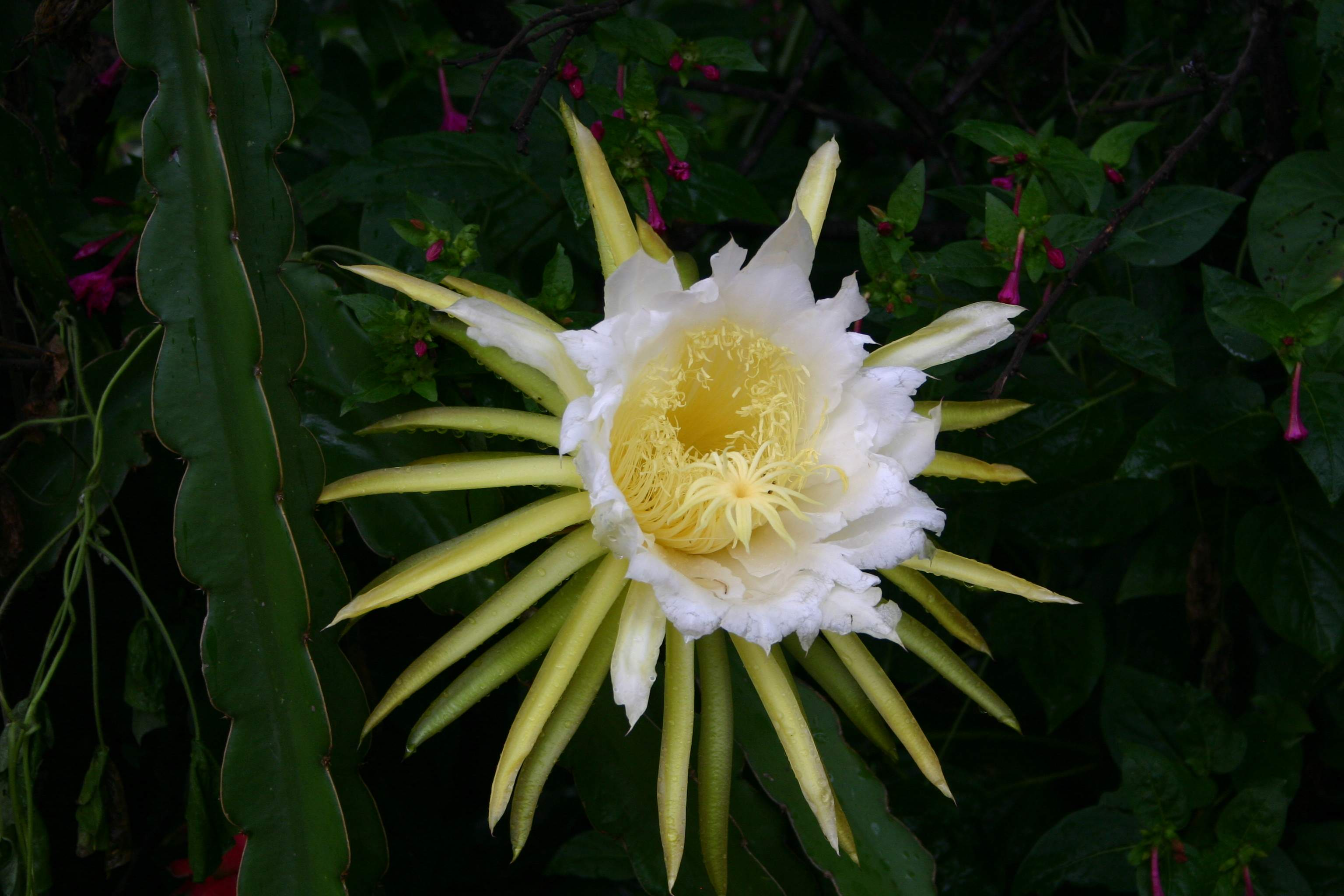
Selenicereus undatus

Night-blooming plants are those plant taxa that open their flowers in the evening, during the night, or in the early morning, and close them during the day. This specificity in flowering time is an ecological adaptation strategy formed during long-term evolution, primarily involving attracting nocturnal pollinators and reducing competition for pollination with diurnal plants. Night-blooming plants are widely distributed across many families of angiosperms, from tropical rainforests to arid deserts, forming complex mutualistic relationships with nocturnal animals.

== Reasons for night blooming ==
Plants bloom at night, driven mainly by ecological and physiological factors. Nocturnal pollinators are relatively few in species but show high fidelity to specific plants, which helps improve the efficiency of pollen transfer. At the same time, many diurnal herbivores cease activity at night, so night blooming can reduce the risk of floral parts being eaten.

== Floral characteristics ==
Night-blooming plants often exhibit convergent morphological and physiological traits. Flower colors are mostly white, cream, or pale yellow, which reflect light easily under moonlight or starlight, thereby increasing visibility, such as moonflower (Ipomoea alba) and evening primroses (Oenothera spp.), which have white or pale-colored petals.

Floral scent is particularly intense at night, often sweet or fruity, to attract pollinators from a distance.

Corollas are often large and trumpet-shaped or tubular, facilitating access for long-tongued hawkmoths to feed on nectar.

Some groups, such as giant water lilies (Victoria), increase floral temperature through thermogenesis, which on one hand enhances scent volatilization and on the other provides a warm shelter for pollinating insects.

In tuberose (Polianthes tuberosa), the tepals have stomata that release scent; these stomata open wider at night when temperatures drop and humidity increases, so the flowers emit a much stronger fragrance at night than during the day.

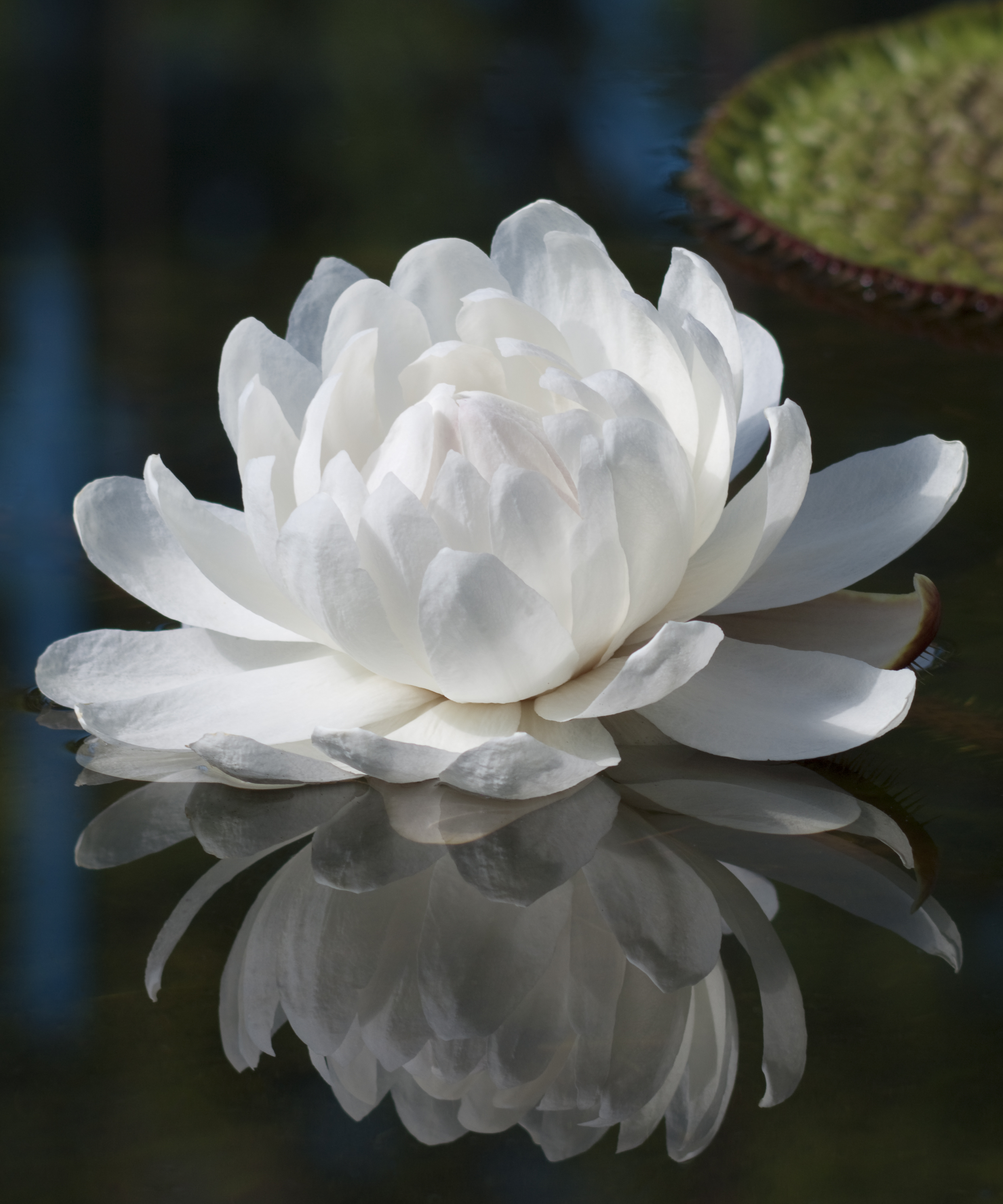
Victoria amazonica

== Main pollinators ==
Pollinators of night-blooming plants encompass multiple animal groups. Moths, especially members of the hawkmoth family (Sphingidae), are among the most important pollinators. They have long proboscises that can reach into deep tubular flowers to suck nectar. Darwin predicted the existence of a hawkmoth in Madagascar with a proboscis up to 30 cm long to pollinate the comet orchid (Angraecum sesquipedale), a prediction later confirmed.

Hawkmoths rely on multimodal signals for flower location, including floral scent, color, and the carbon dioxide released by flowers. Male tobacco hornworm moths (Manduca sexta) show a consistent preference for CO_{2}, while females only use CO_{2} as a long-distance cue in the context of host plant odors.

Beetles are another important group of pollinators, especially many species of the tribe Cyclocephalini (Scarabaeidae) and the family Nitidulidae, which frequently visit taxa with thermogenesis and strong fruity scents, such as giant water lilies and certain cacti. Beetles often feed, mate, and spend the night inside flowers, which provide food and a warm shelter. When Cyclocephala hardyi beetles are active inside Victoria amazonica flowers, the floral chamber maintains a temperature of 29–34 °C, much higher than the ambient temperature, significantly reducing the energy expenditure of the beetles for thermoregulation.

In tropical regions, bats are important pollinators for many night-blooming plants, such as agaves (Agave spp.) and columnar cacti. The flowers of these plants are usually pale-colored, bell-shaped, produce large amounts of diluted nectar and a strong fermenting scent. A few bee species, such as some in the genus Xylocopa (carpenter bees), can navigate under moonlight and pollinate night-blooming plants.

== Representative species ==
Telosma cordata (corky-stemmed telosma) is a common night-blooming plant in tropical Asia. Its golden-yellow flowers open after dusk, emitting a strong fragrance mainly composed of geraniol, nerol, and eugenol, which effectively attracts nocturnal moths for pollination. In many Southeast Asian countries, the flower buds and tender leaves of T. cordata are also consumed as vegetables.

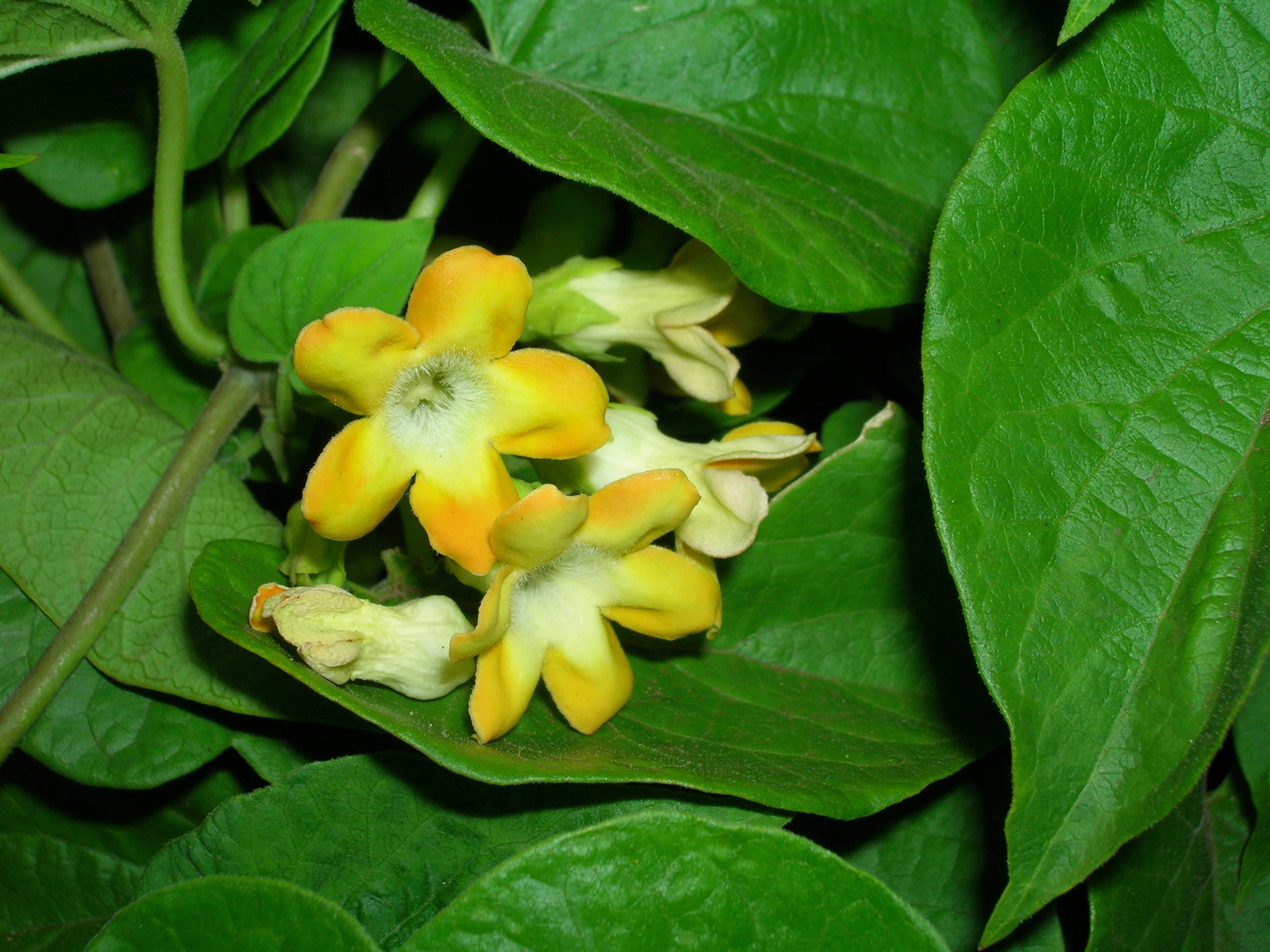
Telosma cordata flowers

Nicotiana sylvestris (woodland tobacco) is native to South America and is an important progenitor of cultivated tobacco. Its tubular white flowers open at night, emitting a strong jasmine-like fragrance to attract long-tongued hawkmoths such as Manduca sexta. The length of the corolla tube closely matches the proboscis length of the pollinating hawkmoths, reflecting a fine-tuned coevolutionary relationship between plant and pollinator.

== Ecological significance ==
The interactions between night-blooming plants and their pollinators not only reflect traditional mutualism but also involve complex signal manipulation and energy investment. Giant water lilies provide direct energy rewards to beetles through thermogenesis; some species, such as woodland tobacco, improve pollination efficiency by precisely matching corolla length with pollinator mouthparts. Microorganisms inhabiting floral nectar can alter the chemical composition and scent of the nectar, indirectly influencing pollinator choices.
