= Moir Gardens =

Botanical garden in Hawaii, United States

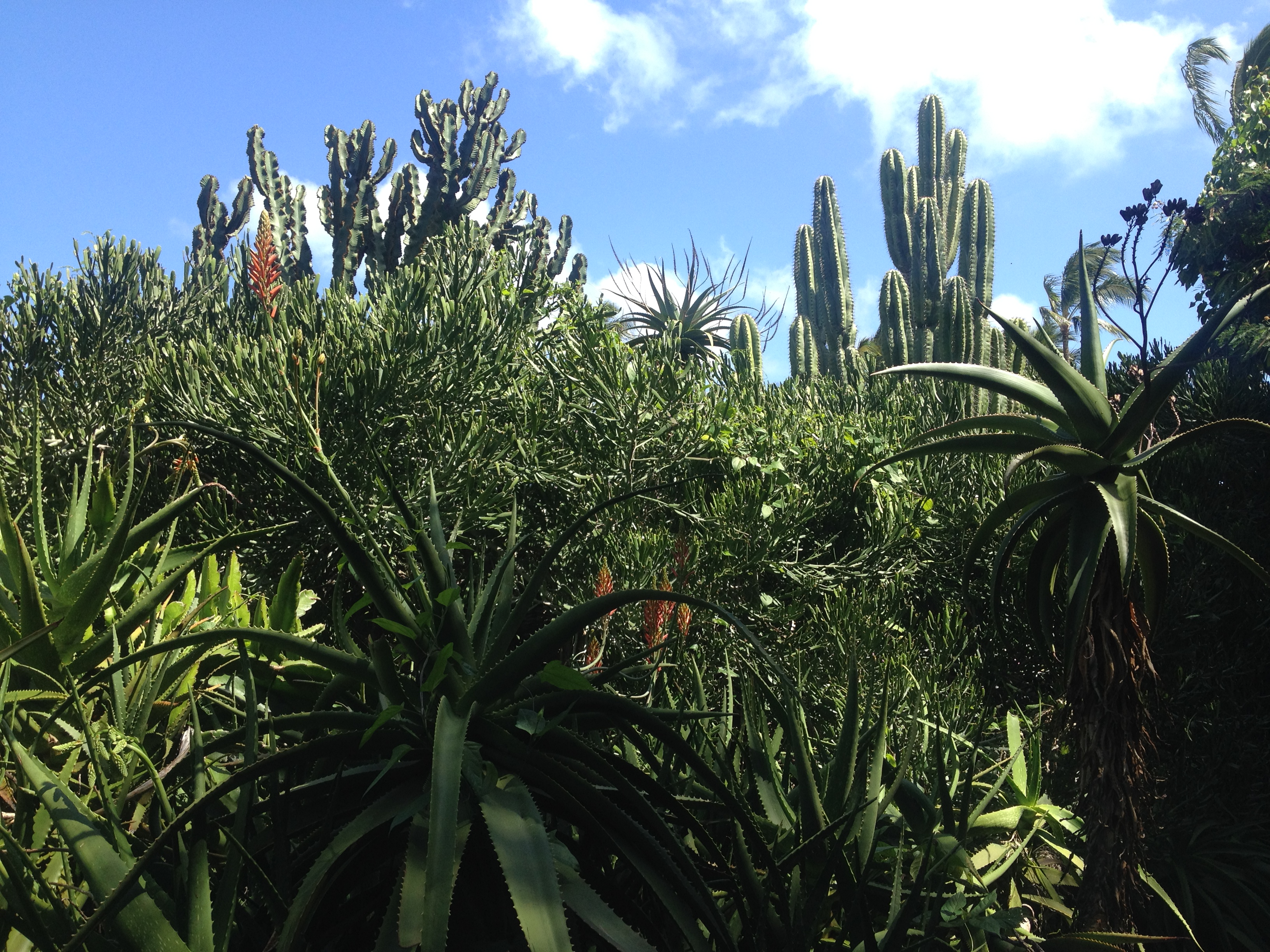
- View of Moir Gardens
- Interactive map of Moir Gardens
- Type: botanical garden and cactus garden
- Location: Poipu, Kauai, Hawaii.
- Coordinates: 21°52′38″N 159°27′39″W
- Created: 1954
- Open: Yes
- Website: www.to-hawaii.com/kauai/gardens/moirgardens.php

The Moir Gardens (35 acres) are botanical gardens located within the Outrigger Kiahuna Plantation, 2253 Poipu Road, Poipu, Kauai, Hawaii. Just to the east is Poipu Beach Park. The gardens are open daily without charge.

== History ==
The gardens were created in the 1930s by Alexandra Moir while her husband was manager of Hawaii's first sugarcane plantation, Koloa Plantation, near the site. By 1948 the private gardens were reportedly identified as "one of the ten best cactus and succulent gardens in the world." The gardens opened to the public in 1954.

== Collection ==
Today the garden contains rare cactus and succulents, bromeliads, orchids, mature trees, and water lily ponds.

== Gallery ==
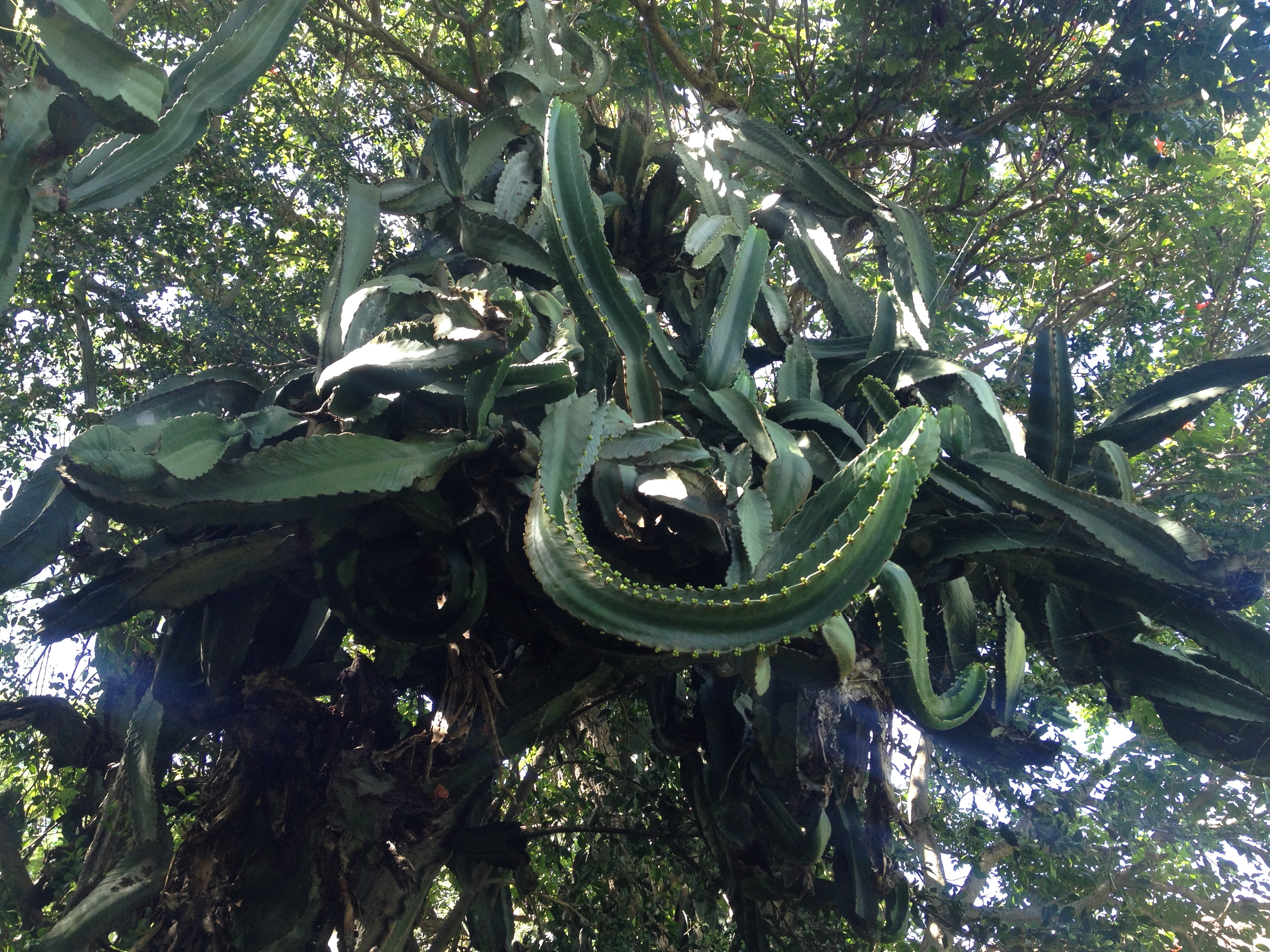
Euphorbia neglecta

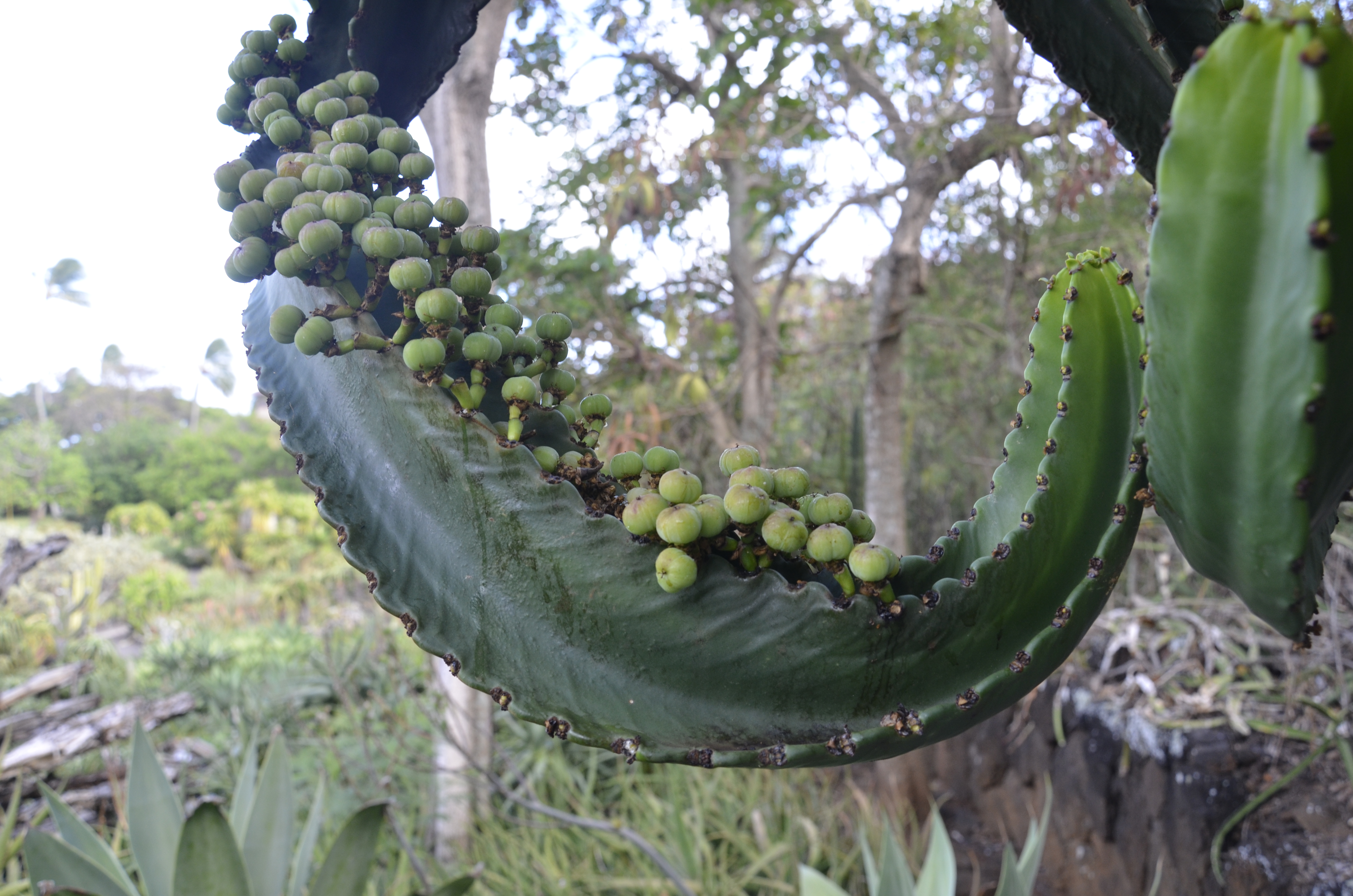

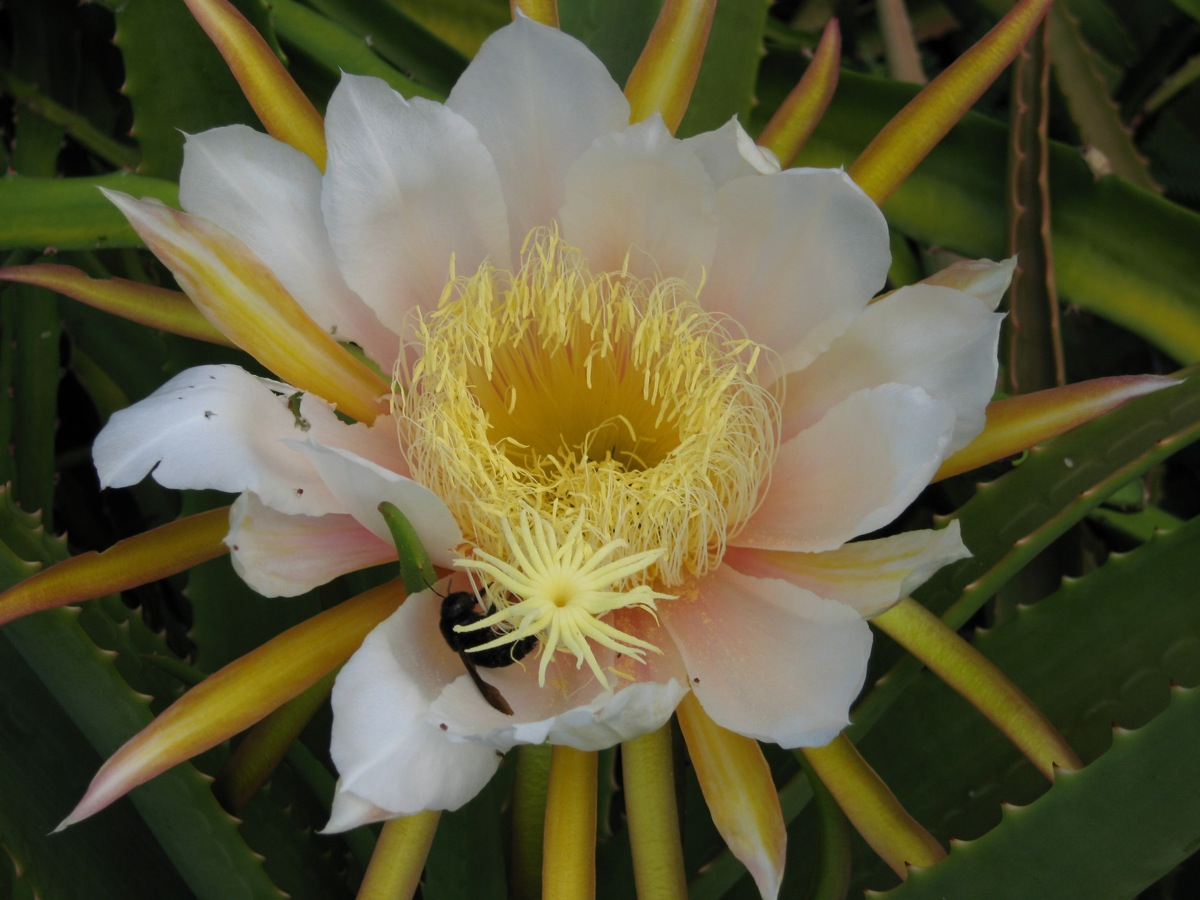
Selenicereus monacanthus

== See also ==
- List of botanical gardens in the United States
