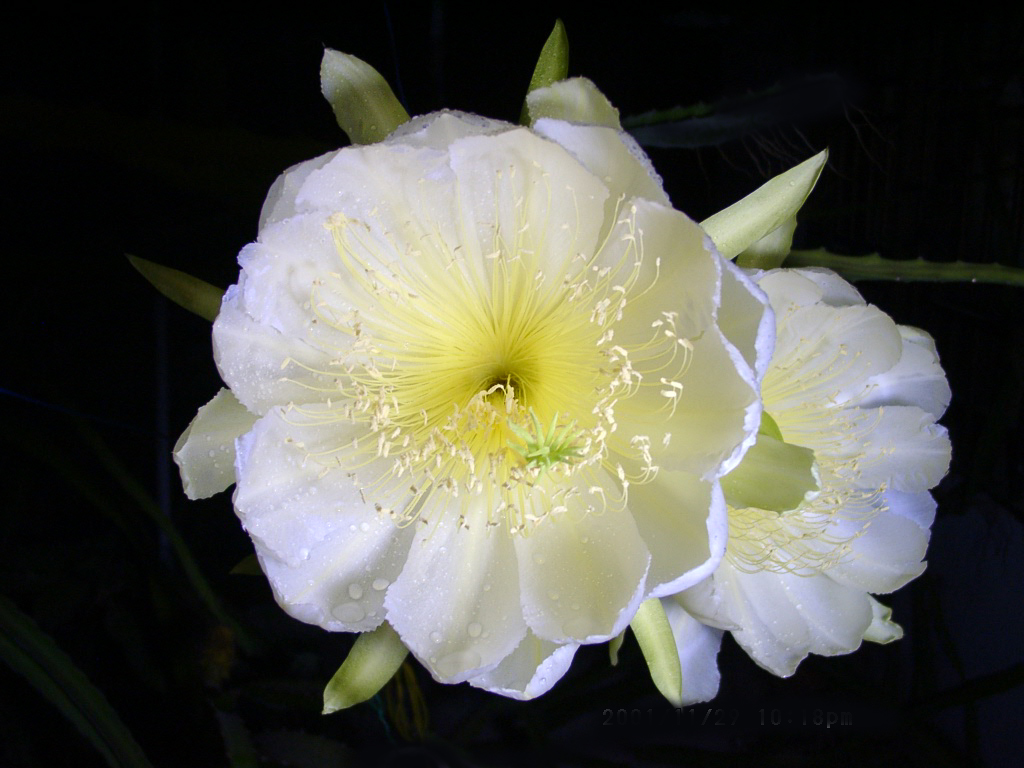

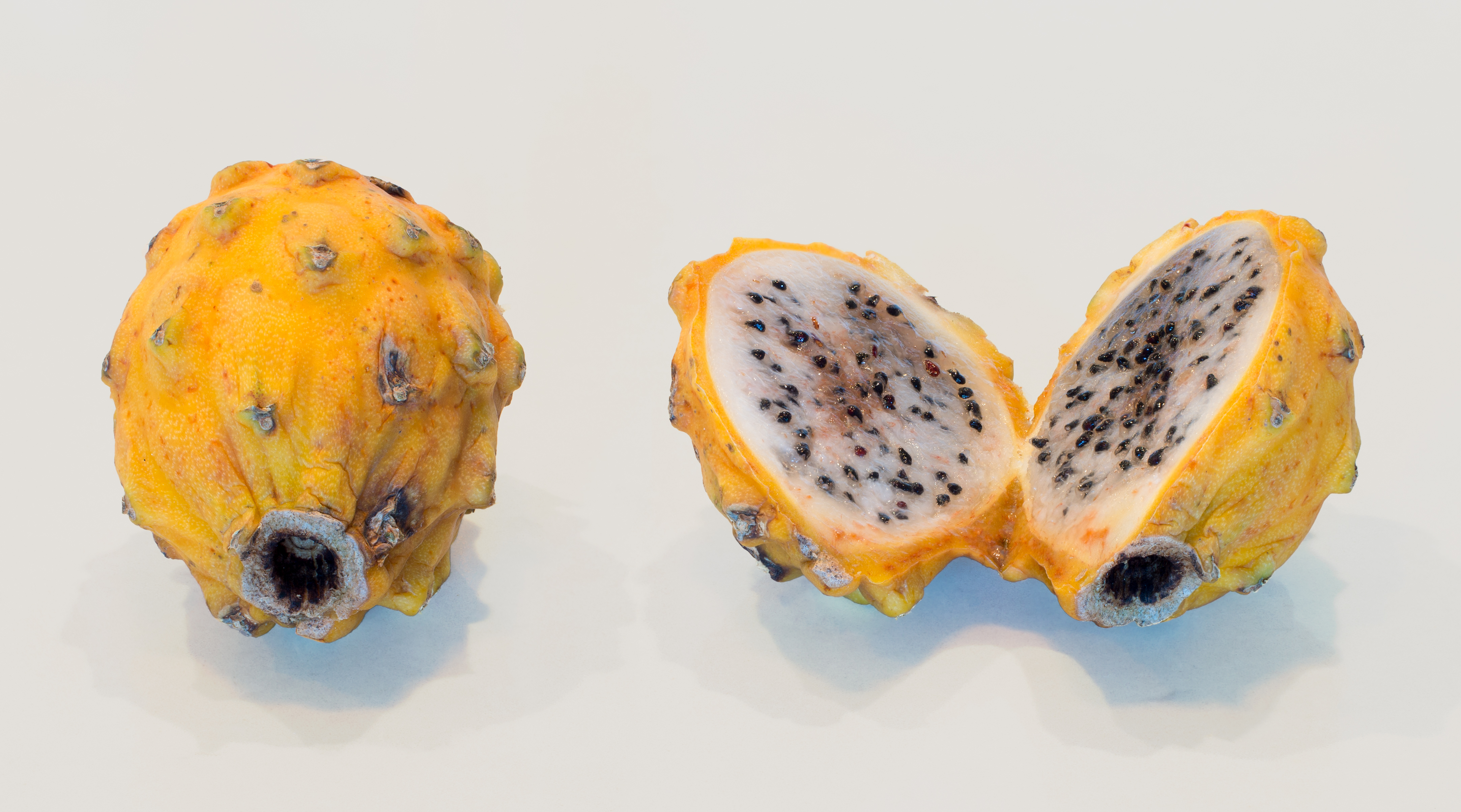

Conservation status
- Least Concern (IUCN 3.1)

Scientific classification
- Kingdom: Plantae
- Clade: Tracheophytes
- Clade: Angiosperms
- Clade: Eudicots
- Order: Caryophyllales
- Family: Cactaceae
- Subfamily: Cactoideae
- Genus: Selenicereus
- Species: S. megalanthus

Binomial name
- Selenicereus megalanthus (K.Schum. ex Vaupel) Moran

Synonyms
- Cereus megalanthus K.Schum. ex Vaupel; Hylocereus megalanthus (K.Schum. ex Vaupel) Ralf Bauer; Mediocactus megalanthus (K.Schum. ex Vaupel) Britton & Rose

= Selenicereus megalanthus =

Species of plant

Selenicereus megalanthus, synonym Hylocereus megalanthus, is a cactus species in the genus Selenicereus that is native to northern South America, where it is known, along with its fruit, by the name of pitahaya. The species is grown commercially for its yellow fruit, but is also an impressive ornamental climbing vine with perhaps the largest flowers of all cacti.

The yellow skinned fruit of S. megalanthus has spines, unlike the green, red or yellow skinned dragon fruits of S. undatus, S. monacanthus and their cultivated hybrids. S. megalanthus is commonly known as "yellow dragon fruit", "yellow pitahaya", "kirin fruit", or "yellow pitaya". This name leads at times to confusion, as unrelated cultivars of other dragonfruit species can also have yellow skinned fruit. One example of a yellow dragonfruit cultivar not related to S. megalanthus is 'Australian Gold'.

First ever genome of Selenicereus megalanthus [2n = 4x = 44] was published by Zaman and colleagues (2025) (https://link.springer.com/article/10.1186/s13059-025-03695-3) with the size of 1.79 Gb, harboring 27,246 high-confidence genes. Authors also describe it as an autotetraploid species and reveal the 3D genomic structure (A/B Compartments, Topologically Associated Domains (TADs), and Loops).

== Etymology ==
Megalanthus (Greek) – large flowered. This species produces some of the largest flowers in the cactus family.

== Origin and habitat ==
The species is native to Colombia, Costa Rica, Ecuador, Nicaragua, Panama, Peru, Trinidad and Tobago and Venezuela. It is found in tropical riparian forests and is epiphytic or xerophytic.

== Description ==
- Stems may lie along the ground (procumbent), climb (scandent), or hang (pendent). Stems are often only 1.5 cm thick, producing aerial roots; 3 ribs; margins slightly undulating; white areoles; 1-3 spines 2–3 mm long, yellowish; several hairs on young growth, brittle-like; green epidermis.
- Flowers are nocturnal and funnel-shaped, 32–38 cm long; pericarpel is ovoid or slightly globose, tubercles are large and flattened, with felt-like and spiny areoles subtended by small bracteoles; receptacle elongate; outer tepals long, green, triangular-acute; inner tepals 10 cm long, 3.5 cm wide, white, broader; stamens numerous inserted in two zones, yellow; style yellow, stigma lobes numerous, green.
- Fruit: ovoid, tuberculate, spiny, skin yellow (sometimes red/orange, when hybridized), seeds black; interior white (sometimes pink, when hybridized), edible, having a pleasant, mildly sweet flavor.
- Pollination: Yellow pitayas are self-fertile (meaning no cross-pollination is required)

== Cultivation ==
This is an easily cultivated, fast-growing plant. It needs a compost containing plenty of humus, and sufficient moisture in summer. It should not be kept in temperatures under 8 °C (46.5 °F) in winter. It can be grown in semi-shade, but it does best in full sunlight. Extra light in the early spring stimulates budding. The plant flowers in June to October. The plant can grow to a very large size.

== See also ==
- List of culinary fruits
