= Poʻipū, Hawaii =

Poʻipū
- Census-designated place
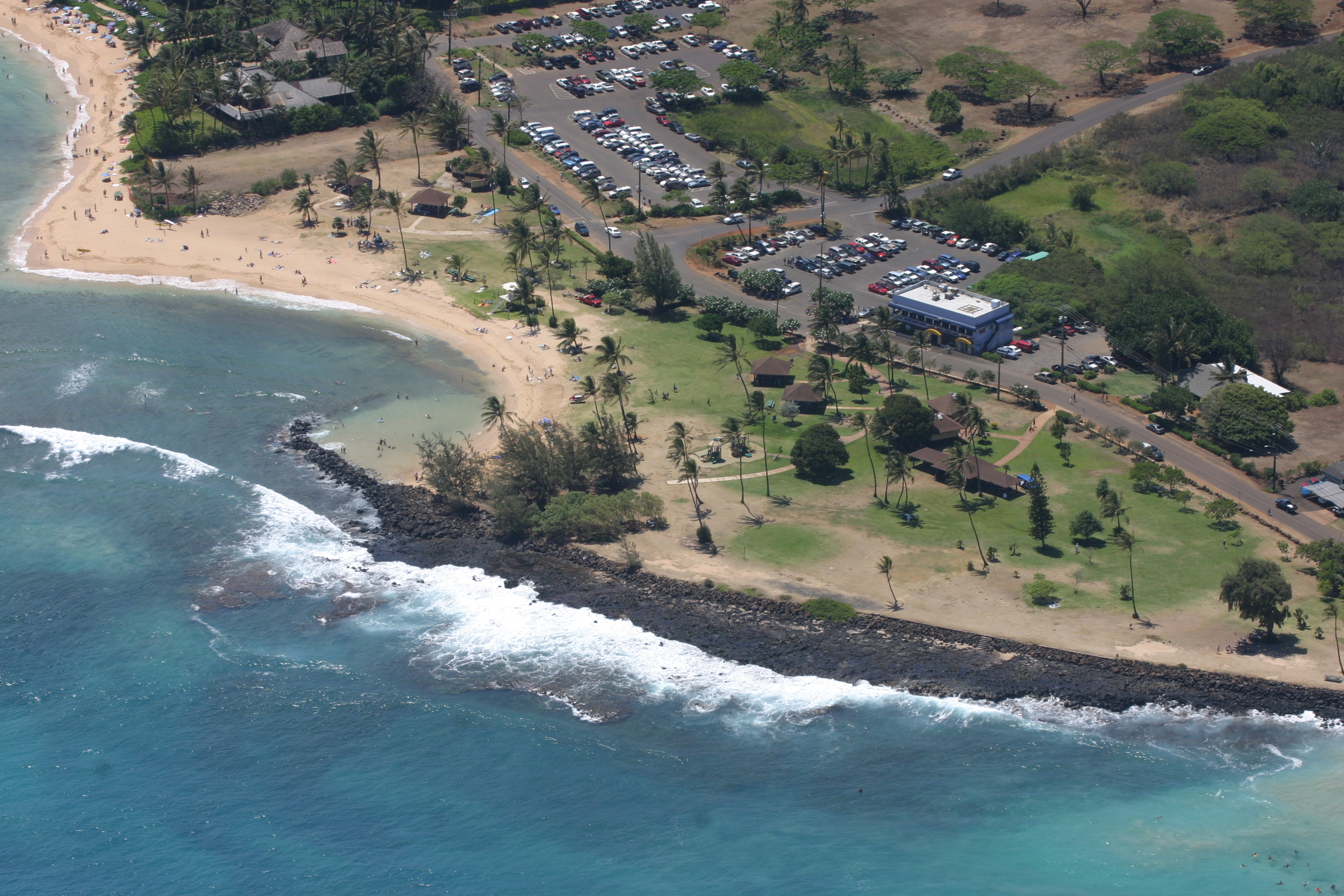
- Aerial view of Poipu Beach Park

- Location in Kauaʻi County and the state of Hawaii
- Coordinates: 21°53′3″N 159°27′51″W
- Country: United States
- State: Hawaii
- County: Kauaʻi

Area
  - Total: 2.89 sq mi (7.48 km^{2})
  - Land: 2.57 sq mi (6.65 km^{2})
  - Water: 0.32 sq mi (0.83 km^{2})
- Elevation: 20 ft (6 m)

Population (2020)
  - Total: 1,299
  - Density: 505.8/sq mi (195.29/km^{2})
- Time zone: UTC-10 (Hawaii-Aleutian)
- ZIP code: 96756
- Area code: 808
- FIPS code: 15-64550
- GNIS feature ID: 0363379

Poʻipū (literally, "crashing waves" in Hawaiian) is a census-designated place (CDP) in Kauaʻi County on the southern side of the island of Kauaʻi in the U.S. state of Hawaiʻi. The population was 1,299 at the 2020 census. The town features a group of high-end hotels, resorts and two main shopping centers.

== Geography ==
Poʻipū is located at 21°53′3″N 159°27′51″W (21.884079, -159.464195). It is bordered to the north by Kōloa and to the south by the Pacific Ocean.

According to the United States Census Bureau, the CDP has a total area of 2.9 square miles (7.5 km^{2}), of which 2.6 square miles (6.7 km^{2}) are land and 0.3 square miles (0.8 km^{2}), or 11.08%, are water.

== Demographics ==
Historical population
Census	Pop.	Note	%±
2020	1,299		—
U.S. Decennial Census

As of the census of 2000, there were 1,075 people, 472 households, and 311 families residing in the CDP. The population density was 437.9 inhabitants per square mile (169.1/km^{2}). There were 1,969 housing units at an average density of 802.2 per square mile (309.7/km^{2}). The racial makeup of the CDP was 69.4% White, 0.1% African American, 0.4% Native American, 16.9% Asian, 2.0% Pacific Islander, 0.7% from other races, and 10.5% from two or more races. Hispanic or Latino of any race were 4.2% of the population.

There were 473 households, out of which 18.6% had children under the age of 18 living with them, 57.4% were married couples living together, 5.3% had a female householder with no husband present, and 34.1% were non-families. 24.6% of all households were made up of individuals, and 7.4% had someone living alone who was 65 years of age or older. The average household size was 2.28 and the average family size was 2.65.

In the CDP the population was spread out, with 16.3% under the age of 18, 3.3% from 18 to 24, 23.0% from 25 to 44, 37.0% from 45 to 64, and 20.5% who were 65 years of age or older. The median age was 49 years. For every 100 females, there were 94.7 males. For every 100 females age 18 and over, there were 96.1 males.

The median income for a household in the CDP was $51,442, and the median income for a family was $62,396. Males had a median income of $40,694 versus $30,625 for females. The per capita income for the CDP was $35,800. About 2.7% of families and 7.5% of the population were below the poverty line, including 6.0% of those under age 18 and 1.3% of those age 65 or over.

== Gallery ==
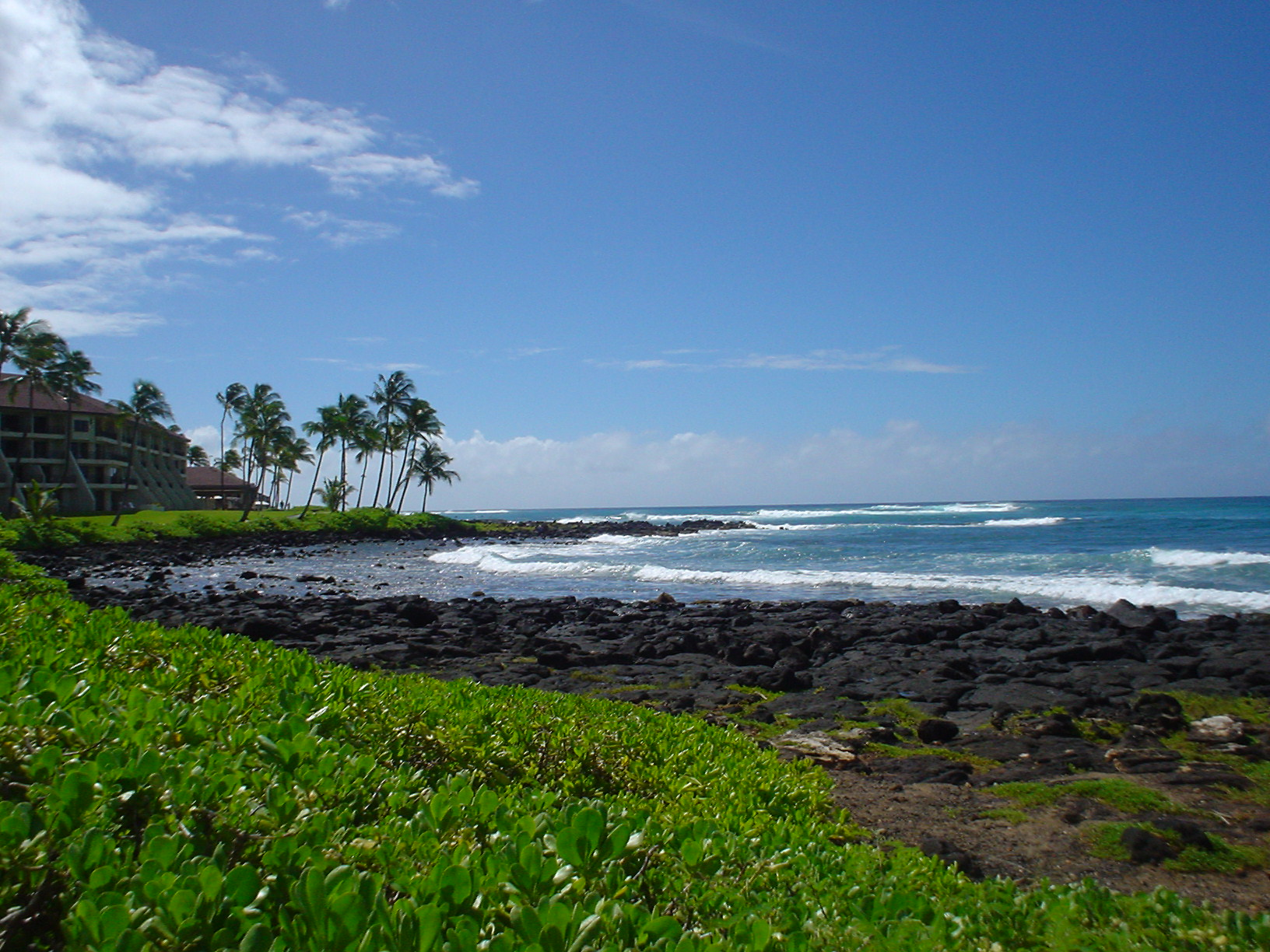
Poipu Beach

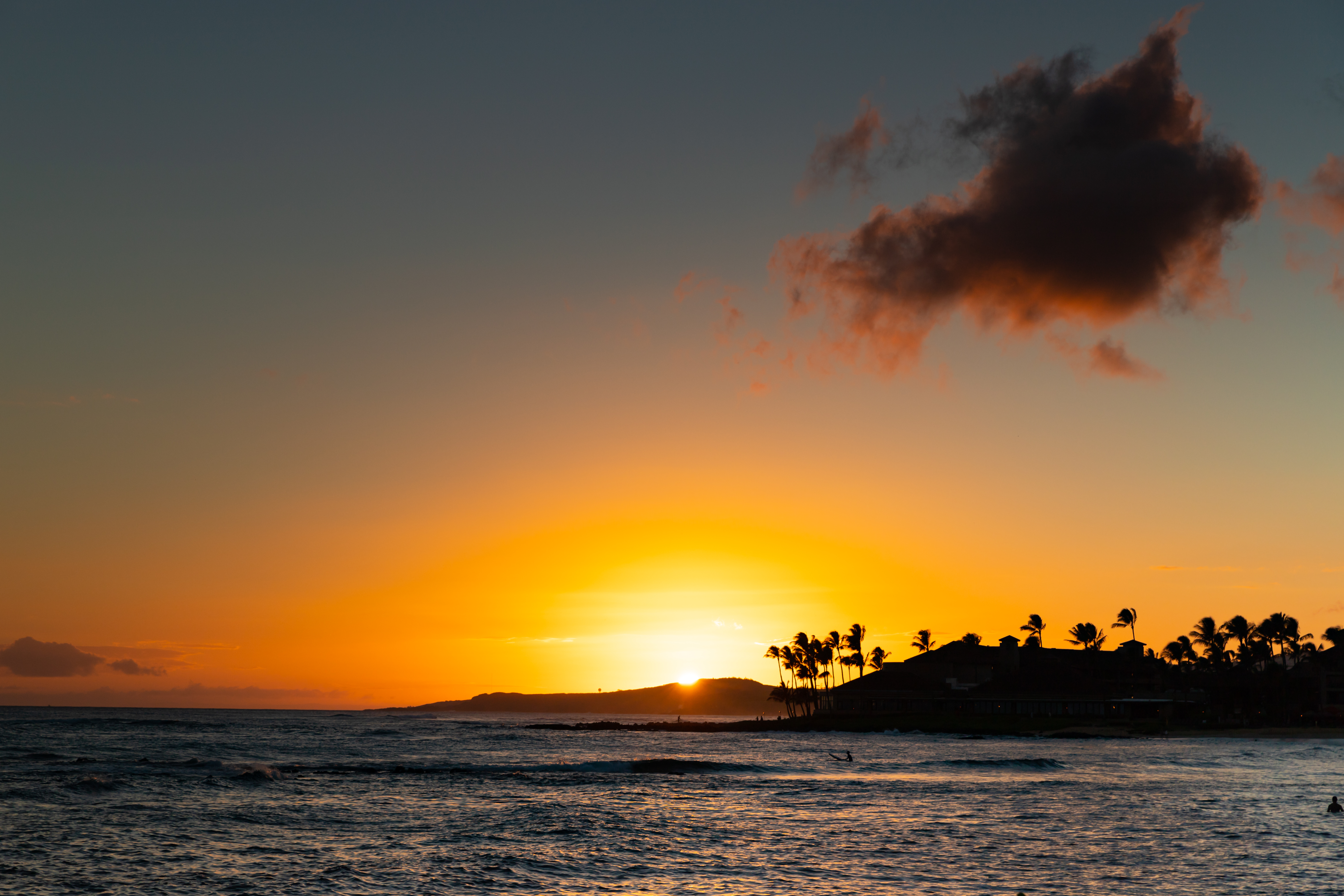
Sunset at Poipu Beach, Kauai, Hawaii

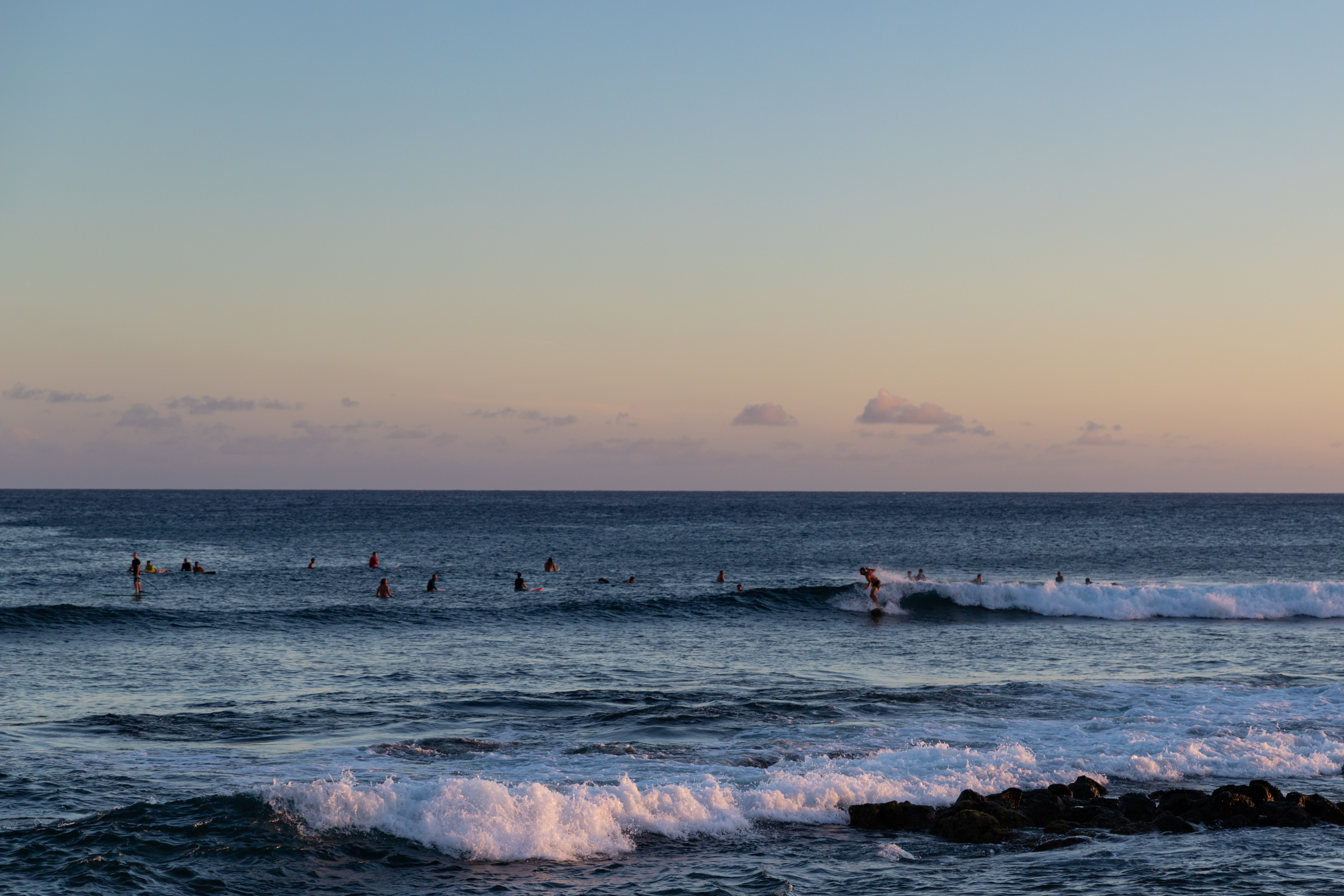
Poipu Beach surfspot, Kauaʻi island, Hawaii

== Points of interest ==
- Allerton Garden
- Kāneiolouma Complex – Archaeological site of ancient Hawaiian village
- Moir Gardens
- Mahaulepu Beach
- Makauwahi Cave
- McBryde Garden
- Poipu Beach Park
- Prince Kuhio Park
- Spouting Horn – park with blowhole
