= Poʻipū Beach Park =

Beach in Poʻipū, Kauai, Hawaii

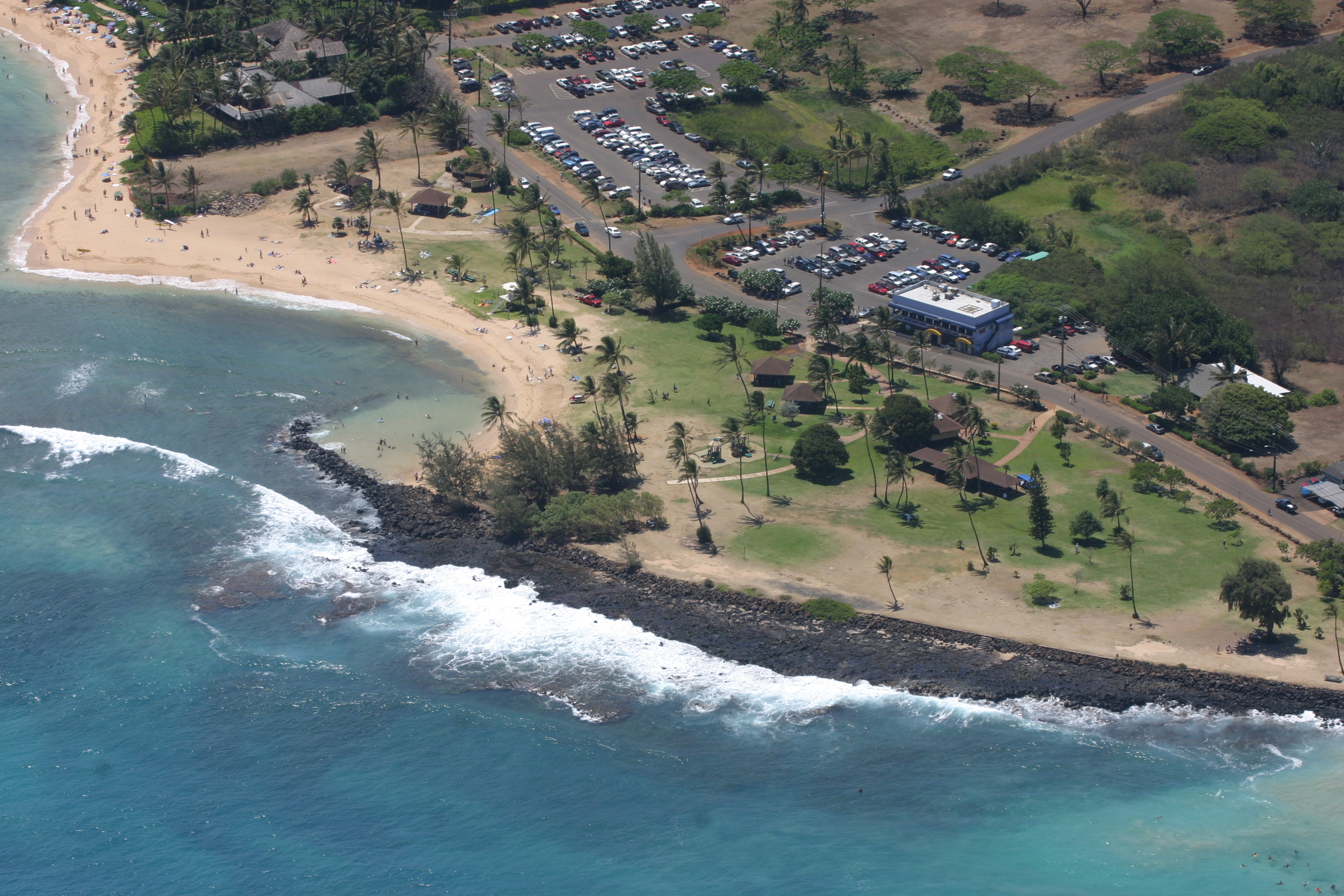
Poʻipū Beach

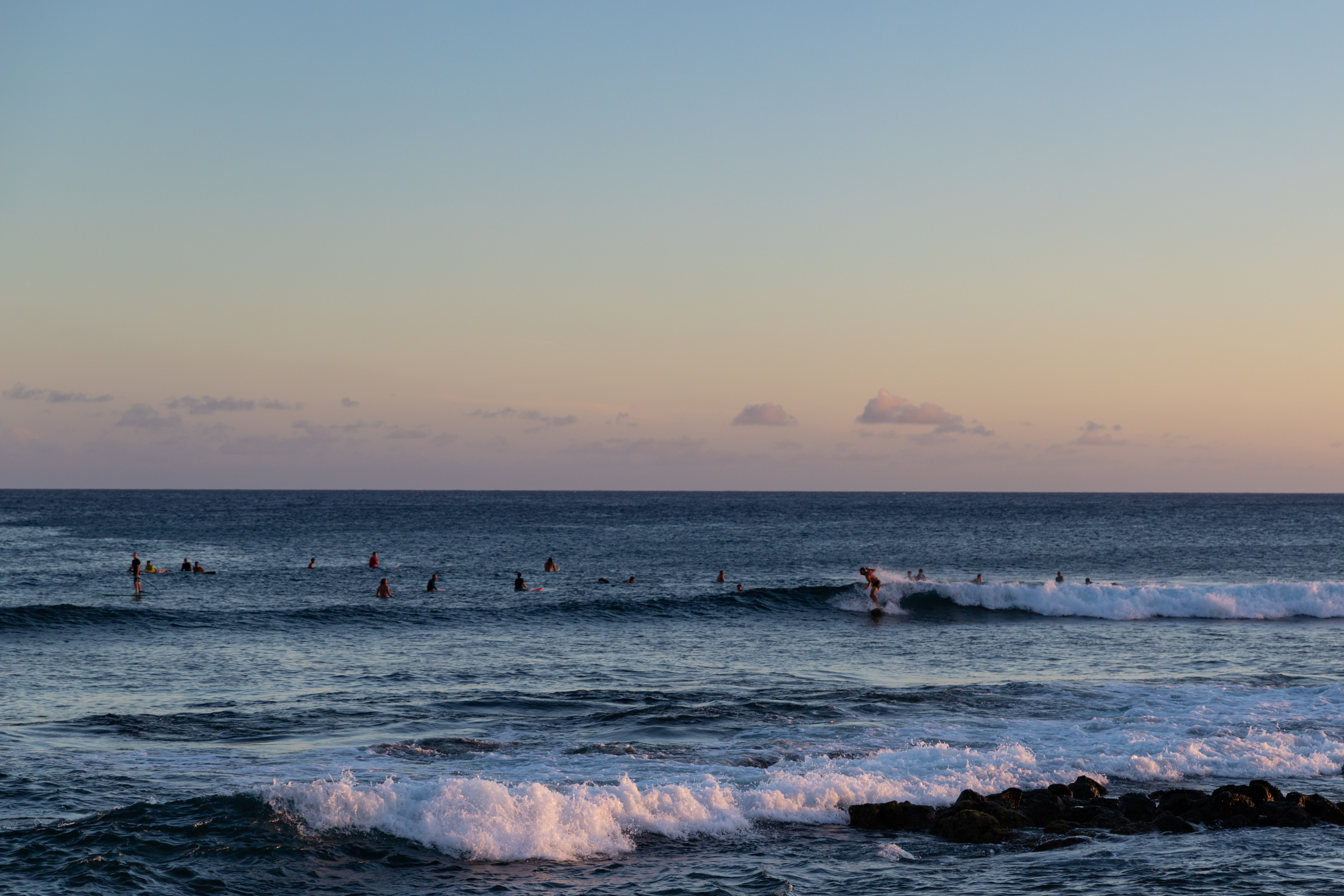
Poipu Beach surfspot, Kauaʻi island, Hawaii

Poʻipū Beach Park is located in the community of Poʻipū on the southern coast of Kauaʻi island in Hawaii.

The beach is a park has lifeguards provided by county of Kauaʻi. There are swimming and snorkeling areas, and a surf break over a reef for experienced surfers only. It can get crowded on weekends. It was ranked as the best beach in America by Florida International University professor Stephen Leatherman, "Dr Beach" in 2001. It is located at 21°52′24″N 159°27′15″W. Nearby points of interest include the Kāneiolouma Complex, an ancient Hawaiian village across the street, and the Moir Gardens on the Kiahuna plantation.

Starting in 2021, Green sea turtles have been crawling out of the sea to bask and doze on Poʻipū Beach every afternoon and evening, surrounded by tourists. Hawaiian monk seals sometimes haul out here to rest.

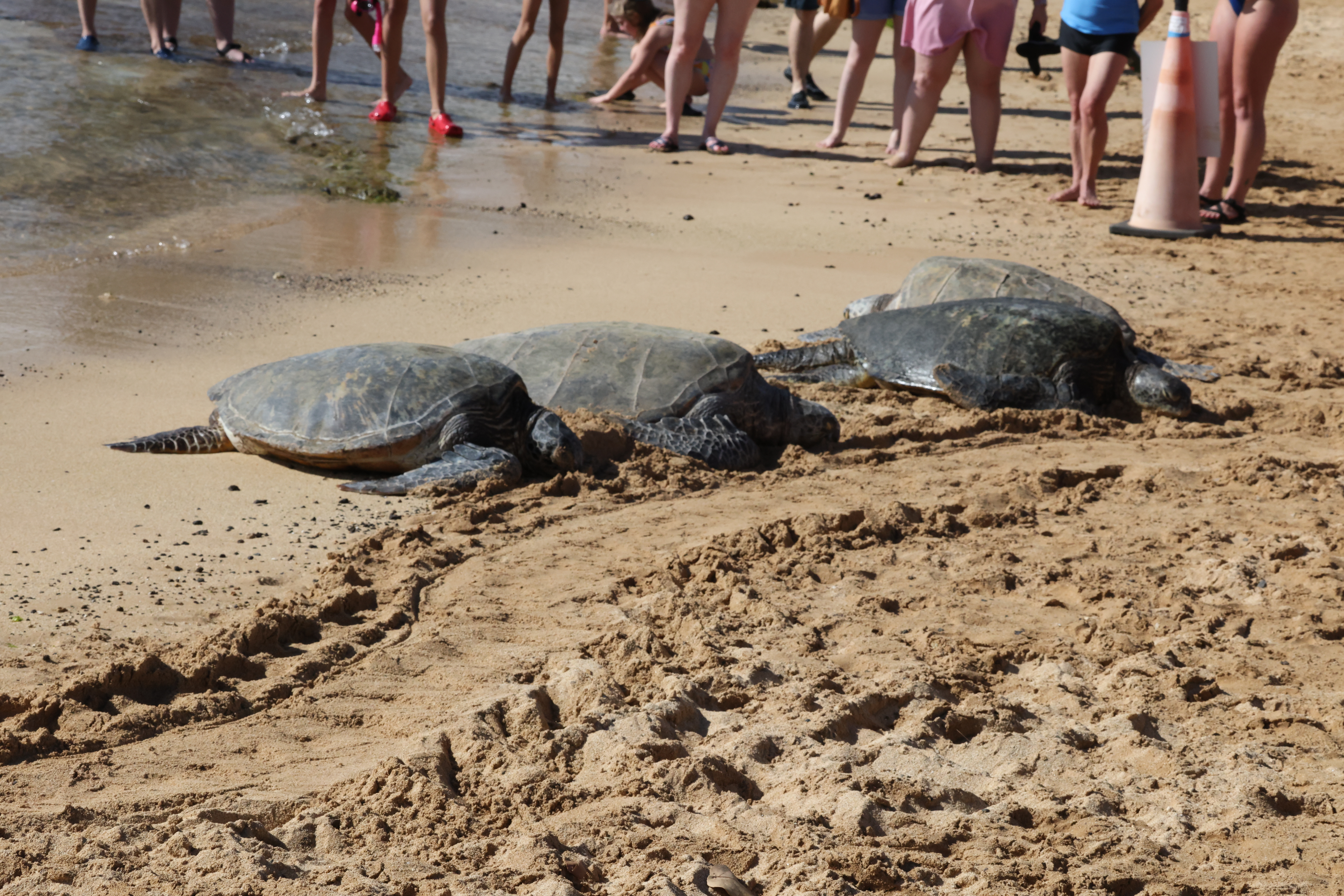
Green sea turtles on the beach
