= Kōloa, Hawaii =

Kōloa
- Census-designated place
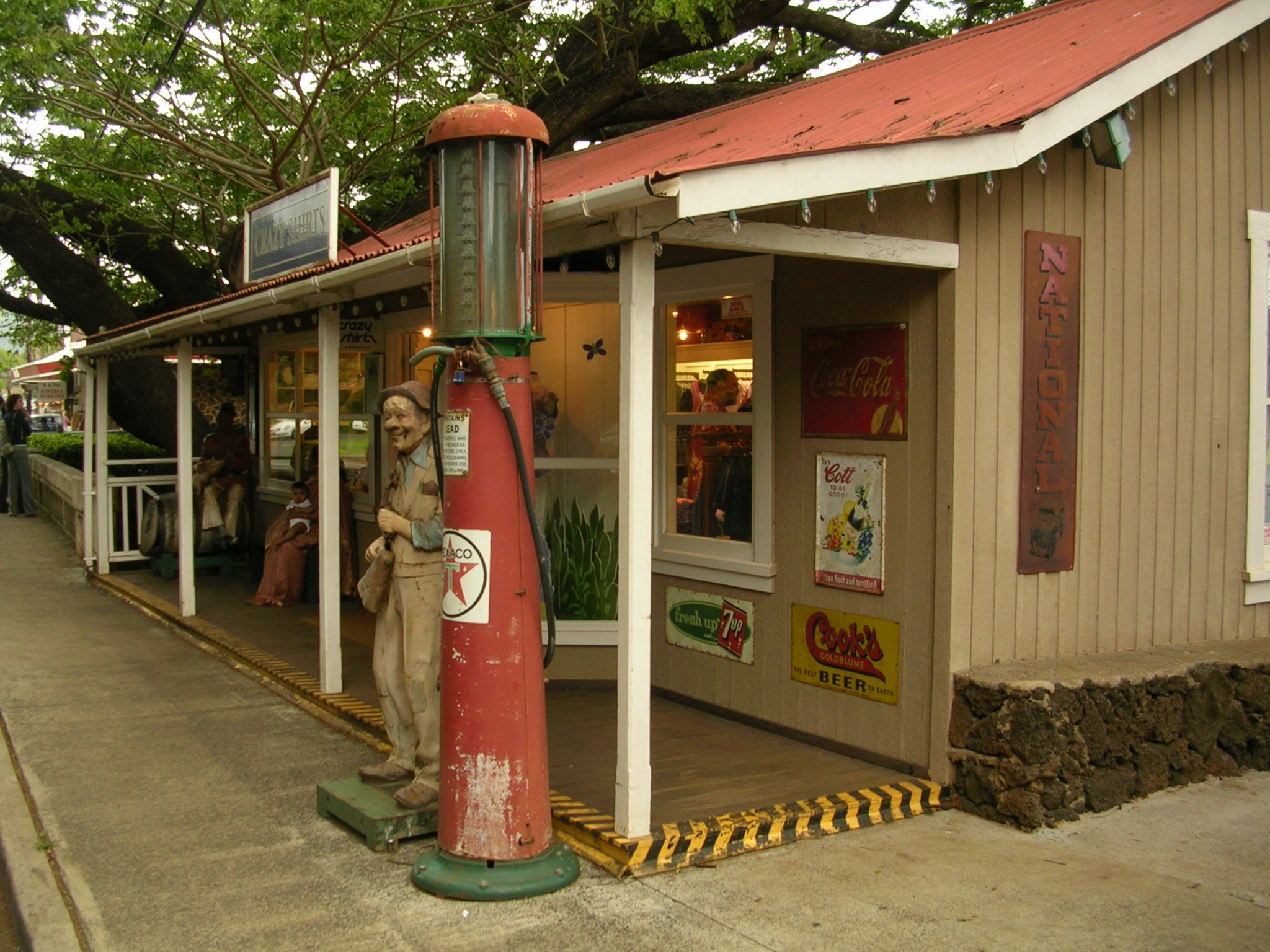
- A shop in Kōloa

- Location in Kauaʻi County and the state of Hawaii
- Coordinates: 21°54′26″N 159°27′57″W
- Country: United States
- State: Hawaii
- County: Kauaʻi

Area
  - Total: 1.25 sq mi (3.24 km^{2})
  - Land: 1.25 sq mi (3.24 km^{2})
  - Water: 0 sq mi (0.00 km^{2})
- Elevation: 213 ft (65 m)

Population (2020)
  - Total: 2,231
  - Density: 1,782.6/sq mi (688.26/km^{2})
- Time zone: UTC-10 (Hawaii-Aleutian)
- ZIP code: 96756
- Area code: 808
- FIPS code: 15-39200
- GNIS feature ID: 0361395

Kōloa is an unincorporated community and census-designated place (CDP) in Kauaʻi County, Hawaiʻi, United States. The population was 2,231 at the 2020 census, up from 1,942 at the 2000 census. The first successful sugarcane plantation in the Hawaiian Islands was started here in 1835. It became a part of Grove Farm in 1948.

Kōloa means "a long cane with a crook." The "native duck" is the correct translation for the similar-looking koloa (without the macron). According to one account, the district of Kōloa was named for a steep rock called Pali-o-kō-loa which was found in Waikomo Stream.

== Geography ==
Kōloa is located on the southern side of the island of Kauaʻi at 21°54′26″N 159°27′57″W (21.907137, -159.465877). It is bordered to the northwest by Omao and to the south by Poipu.

According to the United States Census Bureau, the CDP has a total area of 1.2 square miles (3.2 km^{2}), all of it recorded as land. Waikomo Stream passes through the center of the community.

== Demographics ==
Historical population
Census	Pop.	Note	%±
2020	2,231		—
U.S. Decennial Census

Demographics, 1894

Demographics, 1897

As of the census of 2000, there were 1,942 people, 693 households, and 507 families residing in the CDP. The population density was 1,629.5 inhabitants per square mile (629.2/km^{2}). There were 748 housing units at an average density of 627.6 per square mile (242.3/km^{2}). The racial makeup of the CDP was 20.2% White, 0.4% African American, 0.3% Native American, 43.8% Asian, 7.8% Pacific Islander, 1.2% from other races, and 26.4% from two or more races. Hispanic or Latino of any race were 11.4% of the population.

There were 693 households, out of which 34.8% had children under the age of 18 living with them, 47.2% were married couples living together, 18.9% had a female householder with no husband present, and 26.8% were non-families. 22.5% of all households were made up of individuals, and 8.7% had someone living alone who was 65 years of age or older. The average household size was 2.80 and the average family size was 3.25.

In the CDP the population was spread out, with 26.0% under the age of 18, 9.9% from 18 to 24, 26.7% from 25 to 44, 21.6% from 45 to 64, and 15.8% who were 65 years of age or older. The median age was 36 years. For every 100 females, there were 101.0 males. For every 100 females age 18 and over, there were 96.3 males.

The median income for a household in the CDP was $34,786, and the median income for a family was $43,393. Males had a median income of $31,125 versus $25,938 for females. The per capita income for the CDP was $16,224. About 16.7% of families and 17.8% of the population were below the poverty line, including 26.5% of those under age 18 and 6.0% of those age 65 or over.

== History ==
The Old Sugar Mill of Koloa was the first major sugarcane plantation in Hawaii in 1835. Missionary Daniel Dole and his family opened a boarding school for English-speaking children, sometimes called the Koloa Academy, in 1855.

== Places of interest ==
- Old Sugar Mill – A National Historic Landmark. Founded in 1835, the Koloa sugar plantation and mill was the first successful large-scale sugar operation in the Hawaiian Islands.
- Poipu Bay Golf Course – Home of the PGA Grand Slam of Golf from 1994 to 2006
- Saint Raphael Catholic Church - The oldest Catholic church in Kauaʻi
- Spouting Horn – park with blowhole
- Hoʻai heiau
- Kāneiolouma Complex – Archaeological site of ancient Hawaiian village
- Makauwahi Cave

== Education ==
The Hawaii State Department of Education is the sole school district of the state. It operates Koloa Elementary School.

The Hawaii State Public Library System operates the Koloa Public and School Library.

== Notable natives ==
- Raymond Kāne, slack-key guitarist
- Prince Jonah Kuhio Kalanianaʻole Piʻikoi, born at Hoʻai, Kualu in Koloa; Kuhio was an heir to the throne of Hawaiʻi, served as minister of the interior for the Kingdom of Hawaiʻi and later became the Republican delegate to the U.S. Congress in 1903.
