= Kāneiolouma Complex =

Ancient Hawaiian village on the island of Kauaʻi

- Ke Kahua O Kaneiolouma (Hawaiian)
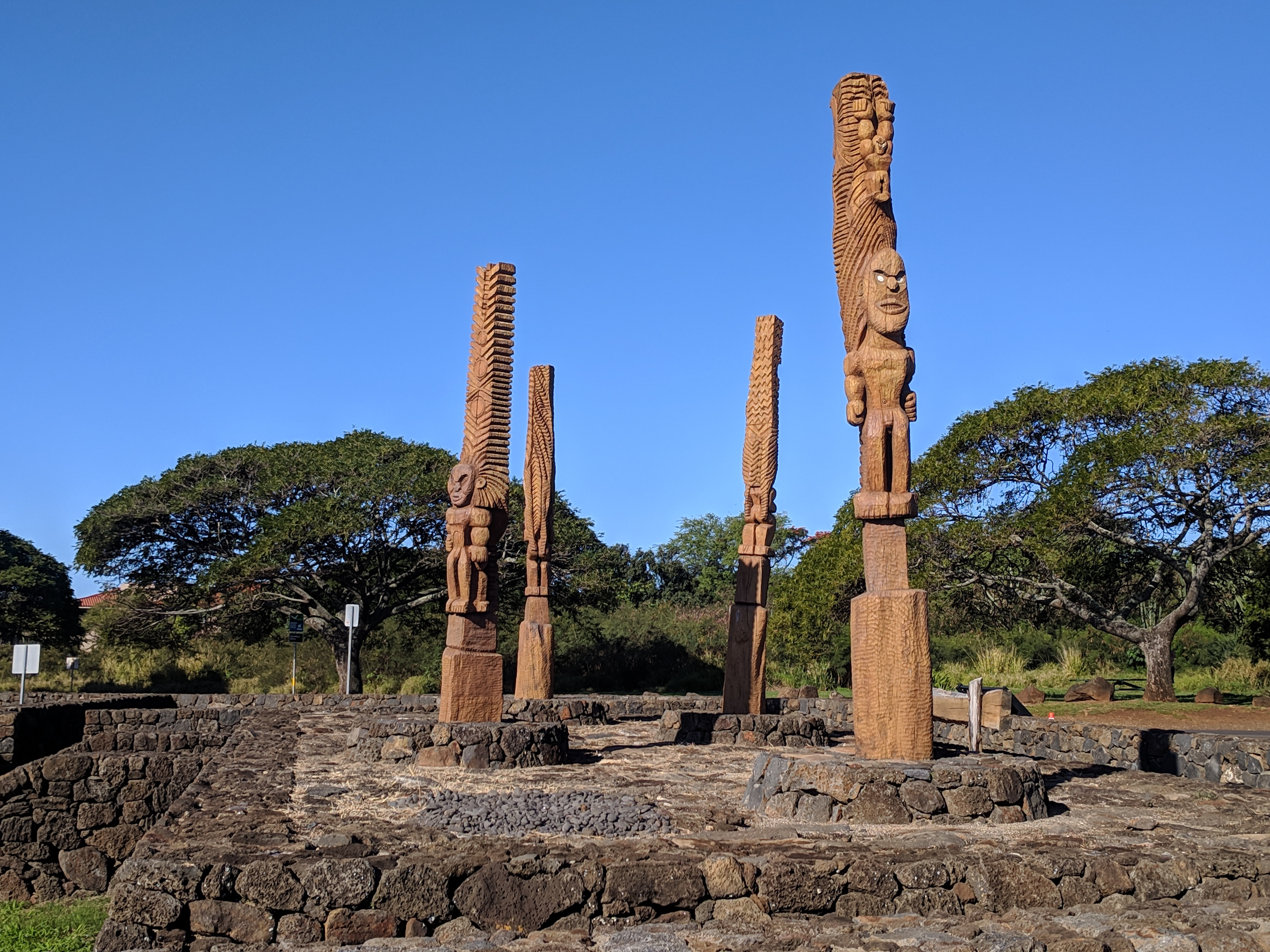
- Four kiʻi representing Hawaiian deities at Kaneiolouma
- Interactive map of Kāneiolouma Complex
- 21°52′32″N 159°27′11″W
- Location: 2000 Poipu Road; Poipu, Hawaii, U.S.

History
- Built: mid-15th century

Site notes
- Area: 13 acres (5.3 ha)
- Restored: 1998
- Restored by: Hui Malama O Kāneiolouma
- Owner: Kauaʻi County

The Kāneiolouma Complex is an ancient Hawaiian village on the south shore of the island of Kauaʻi in Kauaʻi County in the U.S. state of Hawaiʻi. The 13-acre archaeological site (5.3 ha) includes taro patches, fishponds, heiau, shrines, and house sites, with a Makahiki sporting arena in the middle.

== History ==
Kāneiolouma was considered a significant heiau when documented by Wendell C. Bennett in 1931. In his fieldwork, he relied on the available literature, native Hawaiian elders, and, specifically for this site, Tales from the Temples: Hawaiian Annual for 1907 by T.G.Thrum. During an archaeological survey in 1959, Henry Kekahuna noted that the mid-15th century site has three components: ancient-temple religion, agriculture and aquaculture. Kekahuna noted a seating distinction in the sporting arena between the general spectators and aliʻ (noble) who were provided with central, higher-level seating. Boxing, wrestling and spear throwing matches, among other games were held in this amphitheater during the ancient festival of Makahiki. Twenty-three kiʻi sites within the village site were found. The sacred purpose of the arena was made clear by the eighteen kiʻi bordering the game field. As the understanding of the location evolved, the site is now considered a village that originally was about 26 acres (11 ha).

The Kāneiolouma Ancient Hawaiian Village Restoration Project began to work on the overgrown and forgotten site in 1998. The project cleared vegetation and planted native and traditional plants: ʻōlulu, kukui, ʻulu, kou, koa, wiliwili, hala tree and pua kala. A fishpond was restored which attracted birds. The list of restoration suggestions was compiled by Kekahuna, a Native Hawaiian, archaeologist, surveyor, historian, and researcher, as he thoroughly documented the site.

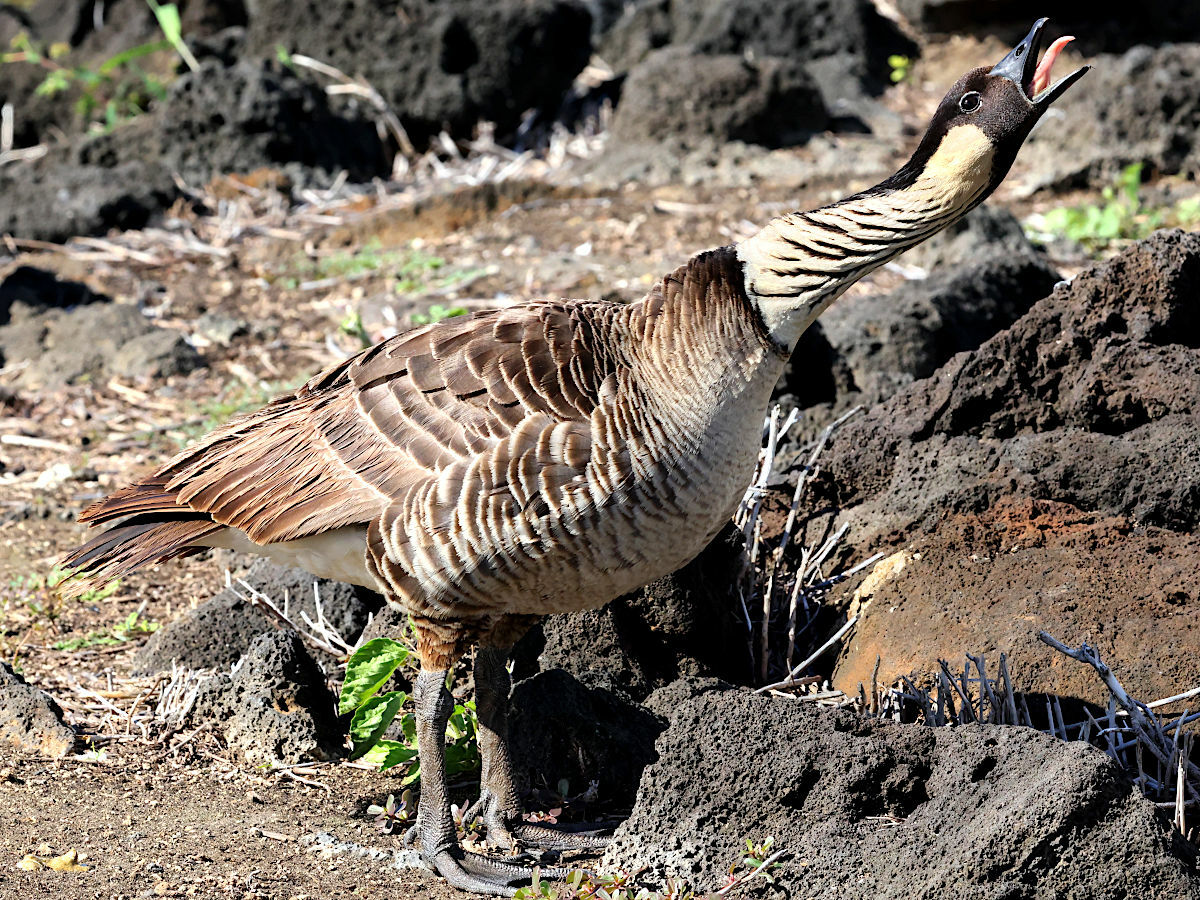
Hawaiian goose by the pond

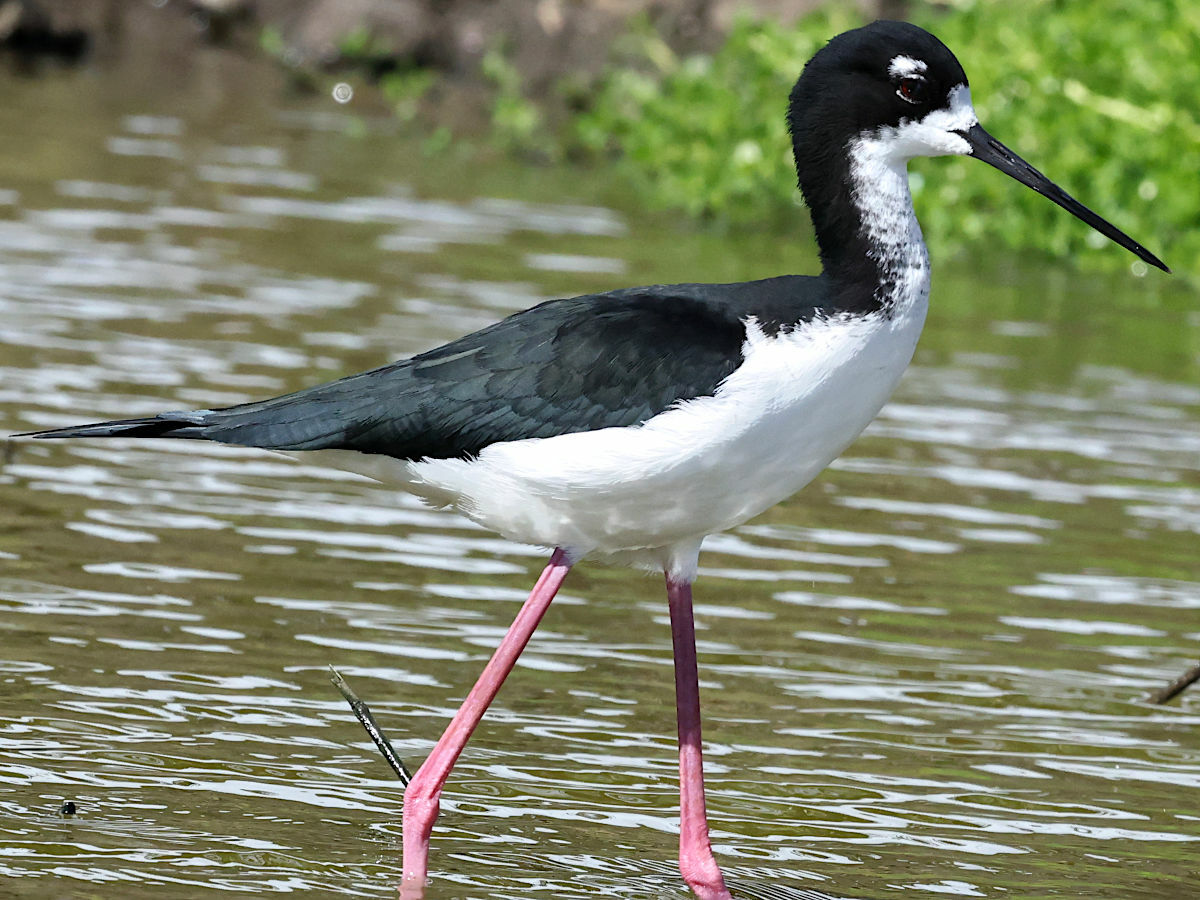
Hawaiian stilt at the pond

Hui Malama O Kāneiolouma, a nonprofit organization, was established in 2003 to conserve and refurbish the area. The group also sought to raise public awareness of the significance of the site as an example of the culture of the Native Hawaiians. A relationship with the county began in 2010 with the stewardship being assumed by the organization of the site across the street from popular, county-owned Poipu Beach Park. A platform named Ke Apapalani O Manokalanipo was constructed in July 2013 with four 16-foot tall kiʻi (4.9 m) facing the cardinal directions. These representatives of the Hawaiian deities honor the ancestors who were aware of the transiting across the sky of celestial bodies and the seasons indicated by the position of the Sun. The organization installed interpretive signs at the intersection of Poipu Road and Hoowiii Road in 2016.
