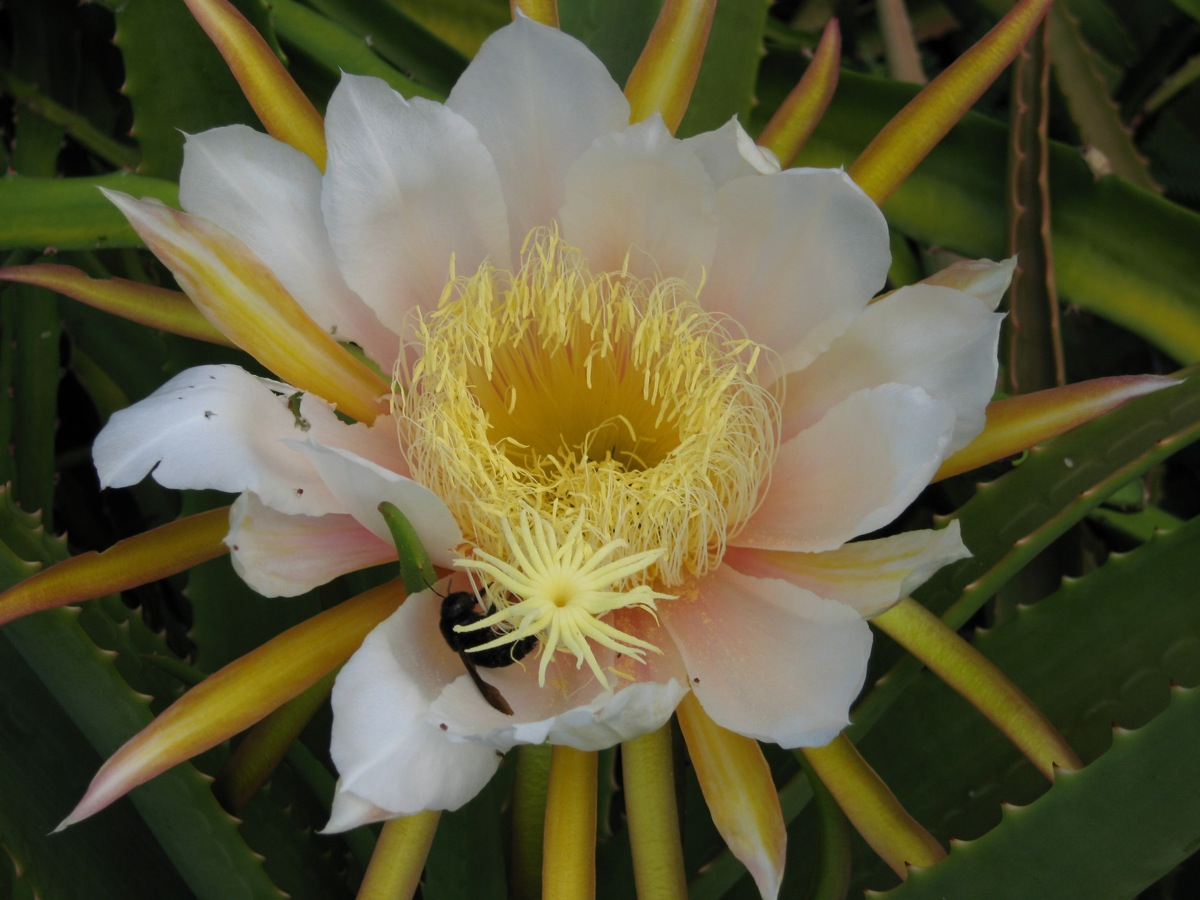

Conservation status
- Least Concern (IUCN 3.1)

Scientific classification
- Kingdom: Plantae
- Clade: Tracheophytes
- Clade: Angiosperms
- Clade: Eudicots
- Order: Caryophyllales
- Family: Cactaceae
- Subfamily: Cactoideae
- Genus: Selenicereus
- Species: S. monacanthus

Binomial name
- Selenicereus monacanthus (Lem.) D.R.Hunt

Synonyms
- Cereus lemairei Hook.; Cereus monacanthus Lem.; Cereus polyrhizus F.A.C.Weber; Cereus scandens Salm-Dyck; Cereus schomburgkii Otto ex K.Schum.; Cereus trinitatensis Lem. & Herment; Cereus venezuelensis (Britton & Rose) Werderm.; Hylocereus estebanensis Backeb.; Hylocereus lemairei (Hook.) Britton & Rose; Hylocereus monacanthus (Lem.) Britton & Rose; Hylocereus peruvianus Backeb.; Hylocereus polyrhizus (F.A.C.Weber) Britton & Rose; Hylocereus scandens (Salm-Dyck) Backeb.; Hylocereus schomburgkii (Otto ex K.Schum.) Backeb.; Hylocereus trinitatensis (Lem. & Herment) A.Berger; Hylocereus venezuelensis Britton & Rose; Wilmattea venezuelensis Croizat

= Selenicereus monacanthus =

Species of cactus

Selenicereus monacanthus, synonym Hylocereus monacanthus, is a species of plant in the family Cactaceae. It is native to parts of Central America and South America (Colombia, Costa Rica, Ecuador, Nicaragua, Panama, Peru, Trinidad and Tobago and Venezuela).
