= Leaf cactus =

The common name leaf cactus (plural leaf cacti) refers to any of the following genera in the family Cactaceae:

- Epiphyllum, a genus of epiphytic cacti
- Pereskia, a genus with very primitive elements including well developed leaves
- Pereskiopsis
