= Tanhua =

Tanhua may refer to:

- Epiphyllum oxypetalum (曇花), a species of cactus cultivated in China that blooms rarely and only at night
- Tanhua Lin (昙华林, literally "Tanhua Forest"), a forest in Wuhan, Hubei, China
- Tanhua Shan (昙华山, literally "Tanhua Mountain"), a mountain range near Dayao in Chuxiong, Yunnan, China
- Tanhua Si (昙华寺, literally "Tanhua Temple"), a destroyed Mahayana Buddhist temple that is now a park in eastern Kunming, Yunnan, China
