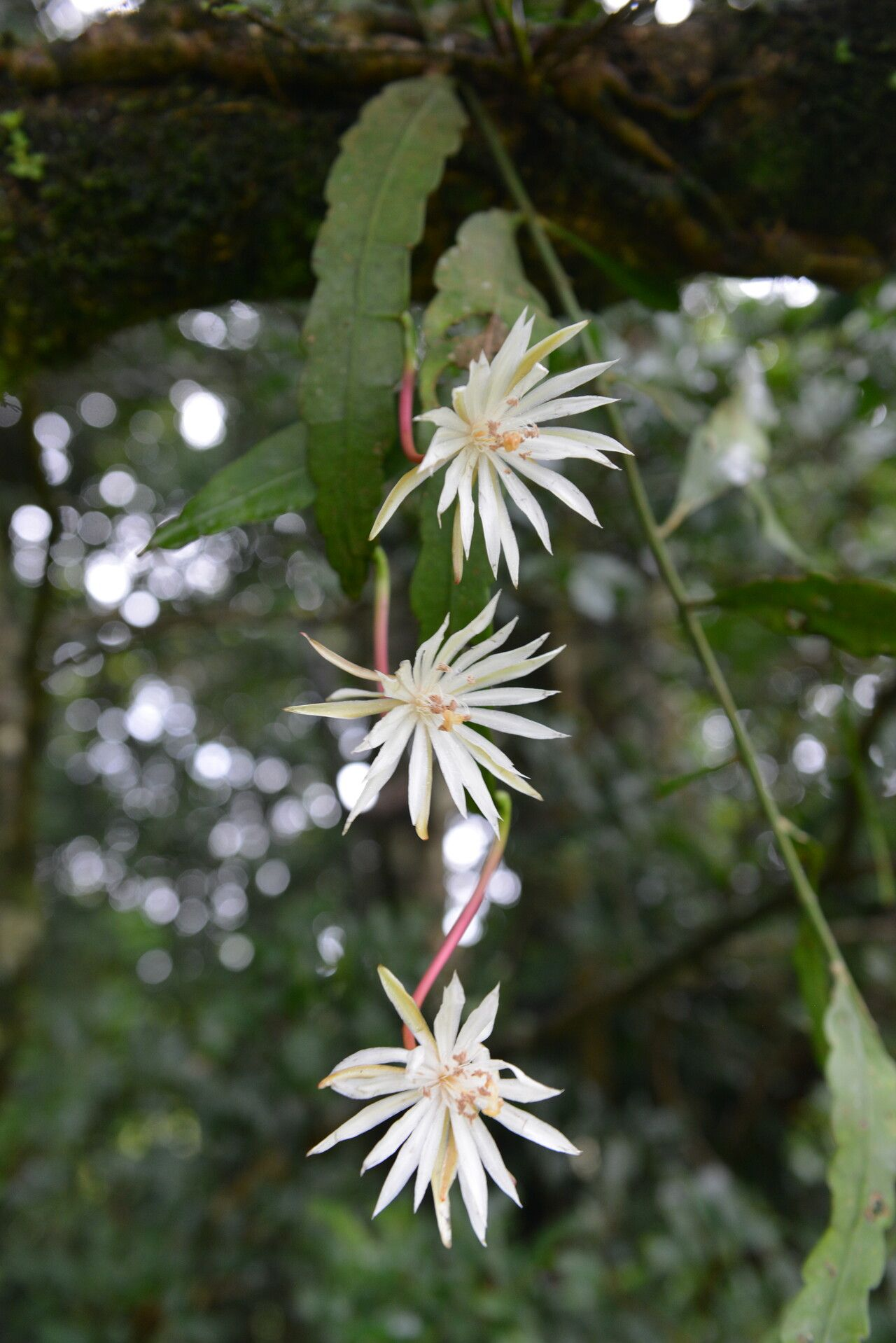

Conservation status
- Least Concern (IUCN 3.1)

Scientific classification
- Kingdom: Plantae
- Clade: Tracheophytes
- Clade: Angiosperms
- Clade: Eudicots
- Order: Caryophyllales
- Family: Cactaceae
- Subfamily: Cactoideae
- Genus: Epiphyllum
- Species: E. cartagense

Binomial name
- Epiphyllum cartagense (F.A.C.Weber) Britton & Rose
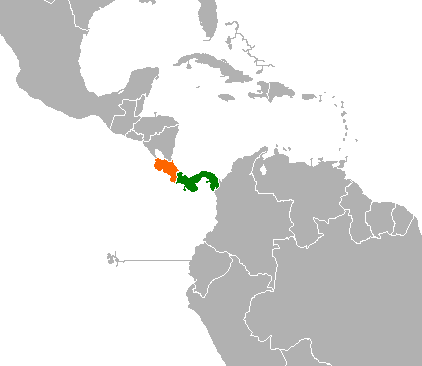
- Distribution of Epiphyllum cartagense

Synonyms
- Phyllocactus cartagensis F.A.C.Weber; Phyllocactus cartagensis var. refractus F.A.C.Weber

= Epiphyllum cartagense =

Species of cactus

Epiphyllum cartagense is an epiphytic species of cactus native to Costa Rica and Panama. This species occurs in subtropical and tropical moist lowland forest or montane wet forest at elevations of 600 to 2000 m. The population is stable and the IUCN categorises the species as least concern. International trade is restricted to the conditions of CITES. The specific epithet cartagense refers to the locality Cartago in Costa Rica.
