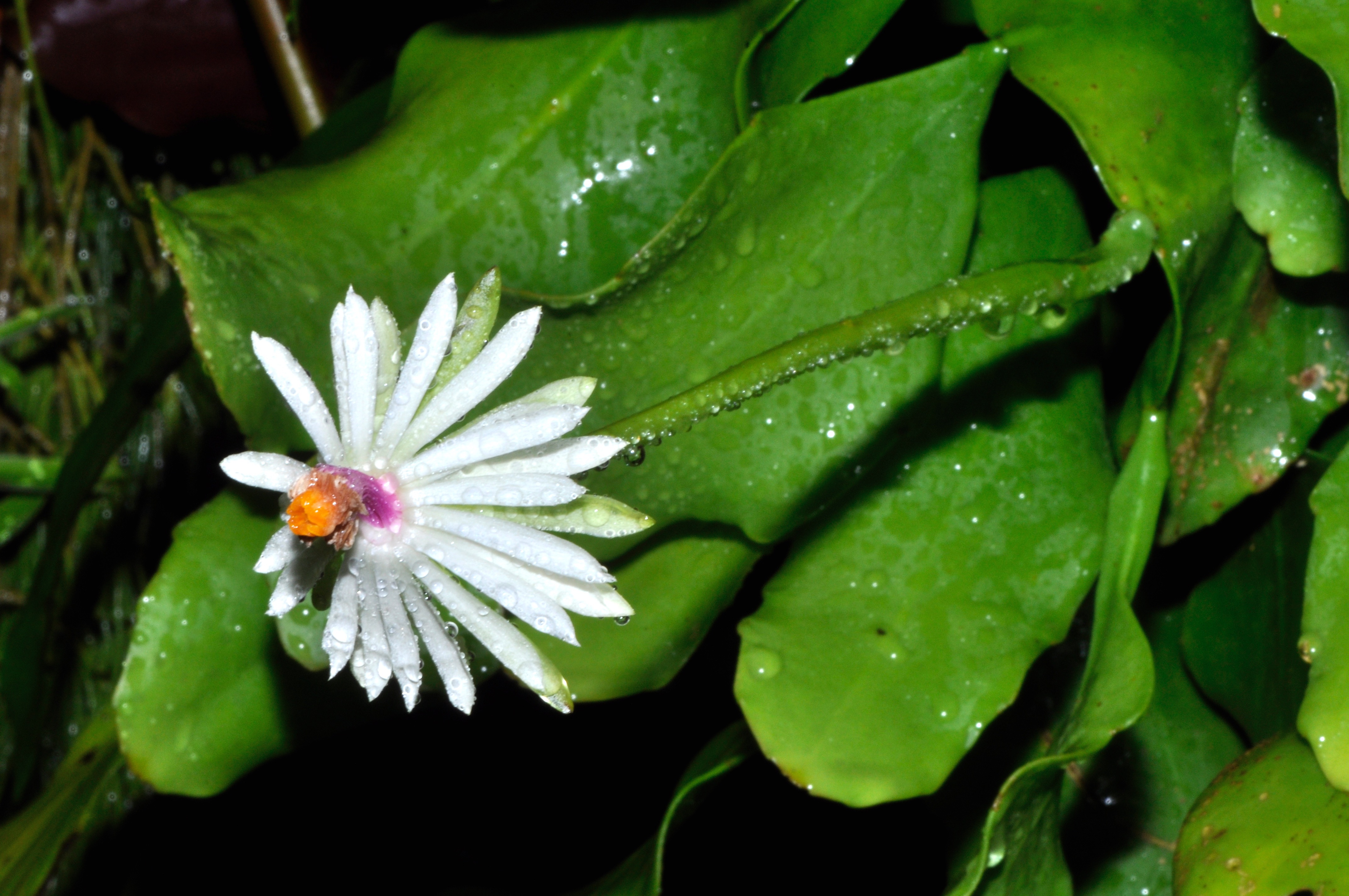

Conservation status
- Data Deficient (IUCN 3.1)

Scientific classification
- Kingdom: Plantae
- Clade: Tracheophytes
- Clade: Angiosperms
- Clade: Eudicots
- Order: Caryophyllales
- Family: Cactaceae
- Subfamily: Cactoideae
- Genus: Epiphyllum
- Species: E. baueri

Binomial name
- Epiphyllum baueri Dorsch
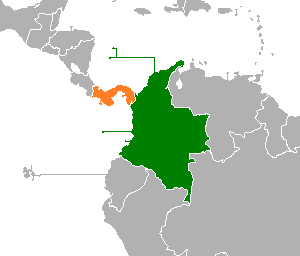
- Distribution of Epiphyllum baueri

= Epiphyllum baueri =

Species of cactus

Epiphyllum baueri is an epiphytic species of cactus native to Colombia and Panama. It is found up to 250 m in altitude in subtropical and tropical moist lowland forest. The assessment of the IUCN red list concludes, that this species status is data deficient.

== Etymology ==
It is named after Dr. Ralf Bauer.

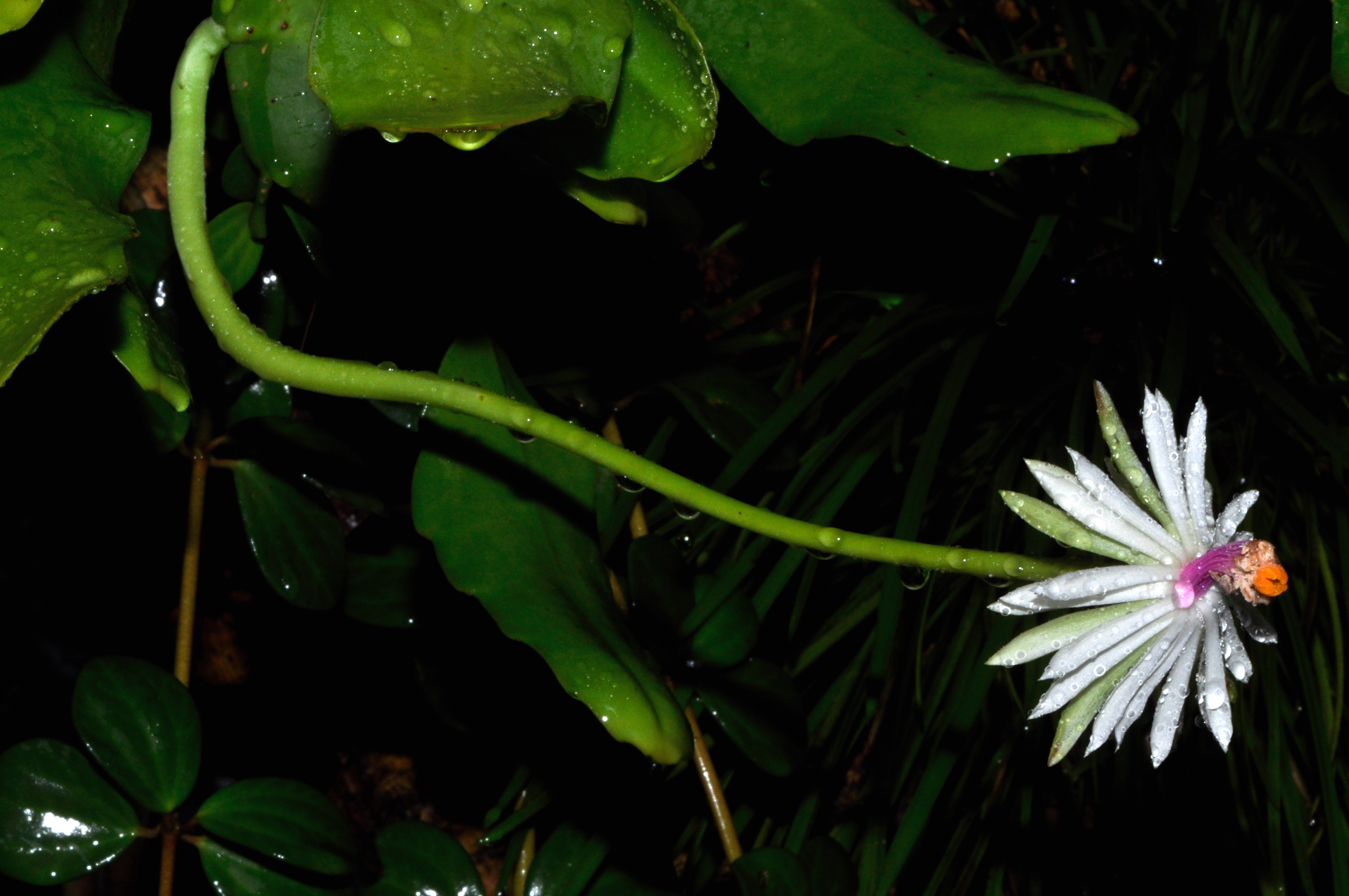

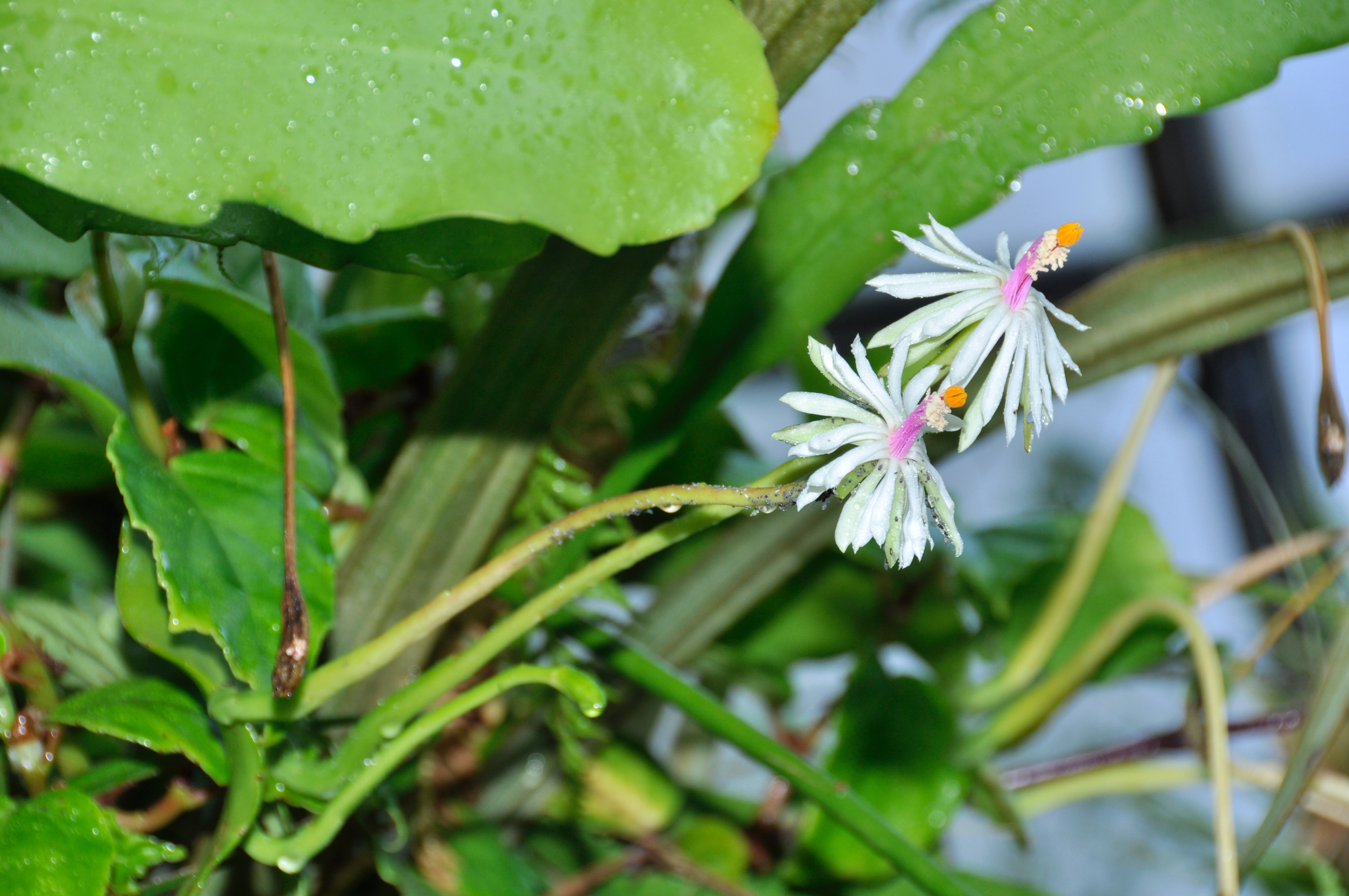
