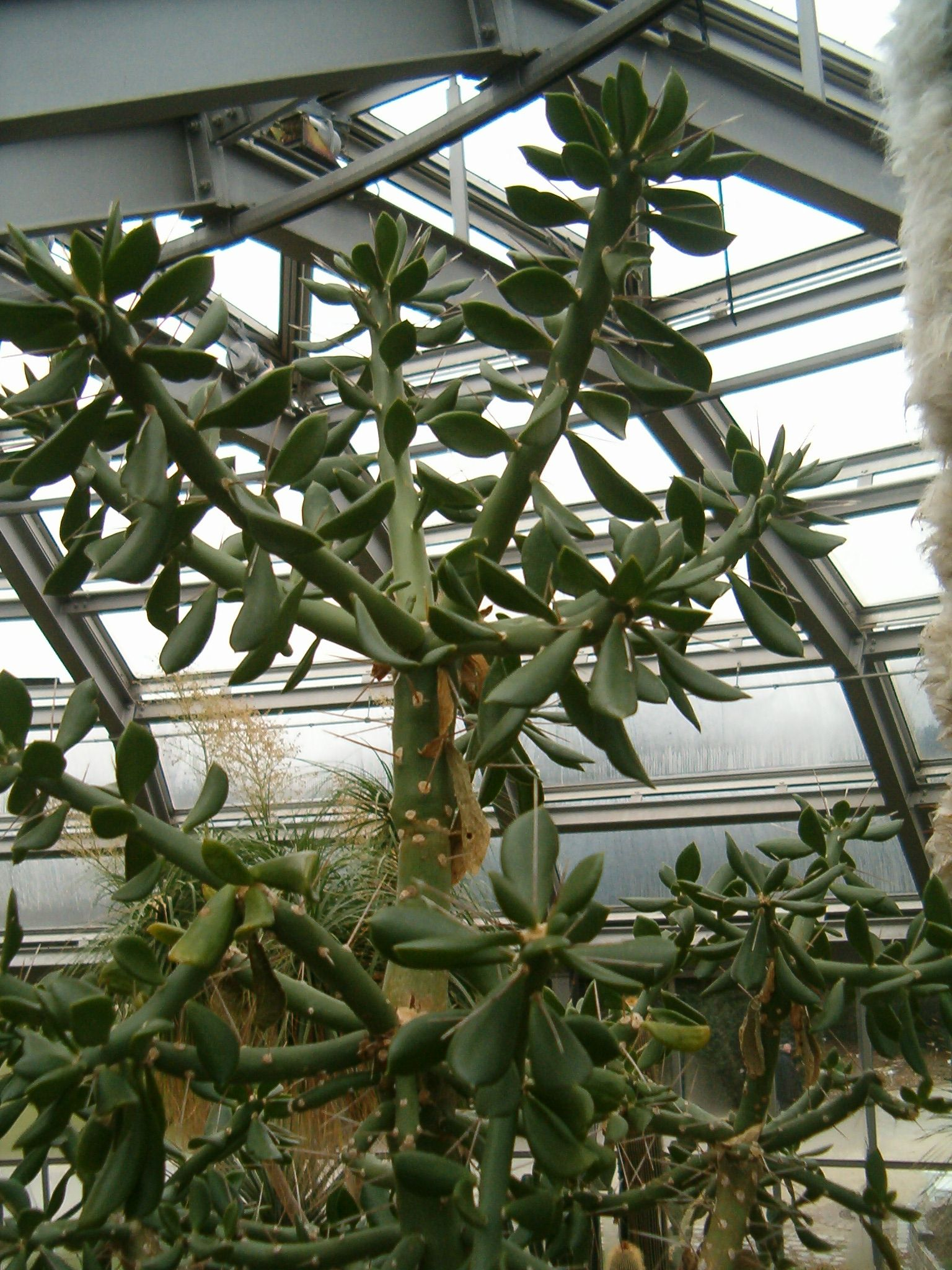
- Quiabentia verticillata

Scientific classification
- Kingdom: Plantae
- Clade: Tracheophytes
- Clade: Angiosperms
- Clade: Eudicots
- Order: Caryophyllales
- Family: Cactaceae
- Subfamily: Opuntioideae
- Tribe: Cylindropuntieae
- Genus: Quiabentia; Britton & Rose

Type species
- Quiabentia zehntneri

Species
- See Text

= Quiabentia =

Genus of cacti

Quiabentia is a genus of cacti, closely related to Pereskiopsis.

== Description ==
The tree-like or bushy xerophytic species of the genus Quiabentia have whorled, fleshy, round branches that produce flat, fleshy leaves. The leaves are broadly ovate to spatulate and up to 7 centimeters long. Their areoles are covered with glochids and numerous spines.

The almost terminal or terminal appearing, striking flowers are red or pink and open during the day. The flower cup has leaves, areoles, glochids and thorns. A flower tube is missing.

The fruits are elongated, fleshy and usually smooth. The large, circular and flattened seeds have a seed coat.

== Taxonomy ==
One species of the genus Quiabentia is distributed in Brazil, the other in Bolivia, Paraguay and Argentina.

The first description of the genus was made in 1923 by Nathaniel Lord Britton and Joseph Nelson Rose in the appendix to the fourth volume of their work The Cactaceae. The type species of the genus is Quiabentia zehntneri.

=== Species ===
Species of the genus Quiabentia according to Plants of the World Online As of January 2023:

| Image | Scientific name | Distribution |
|---|---|---|
| | Quiabentia verticillata (Vaupel) Borg | Bolivia to N. Argentina |
| | Quiabentia zehntneri (Britton & Rose) Britton & Rose | Brazil (Bahia, Minas Gerais). |
