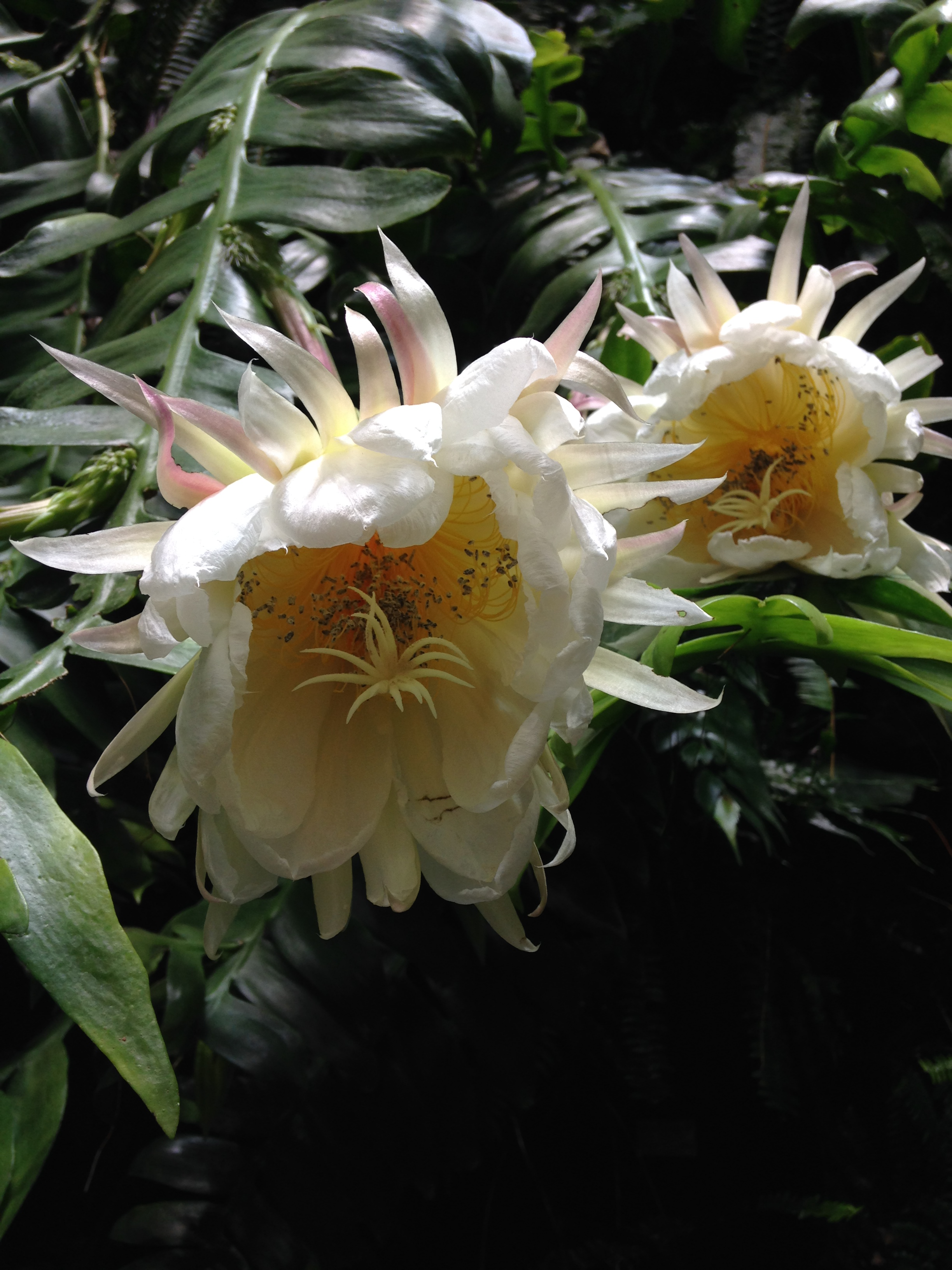

Conservation status
- Data Deficient (IUCN 3.1)
- CITES Appendix II (CITES)

Scientific classification
- Kingdom: Plantae
- Clade: Tracheophytes
- Clade: Angiosperms
- Clade: Eudicots
- Order: Caryophyllales
- Family: Cactaceae
- Subfamily: Cactoideae
- Genus: Epiphyllum
- Species: E. chrysocardium

Binomial name
- Epiphyllum chrysocardium Alexander
- Epiphyllum chrysocardium is native to Southeast Mexico

Synonyms
- Chiapasophyllum chrysocardium (Alexander) Doweld; Marniera chrysocardia (Alexander) Backeb.; Selenicereus chrysocardium (Alexander) Kimnach

= Epiphyllum chrysocardium =

Species of plant

Epiphyllum chrysocardium (syn. Selenicereus chrysocardium) is an epiphytic cactus endemic to Mexico. It is sometimes called fern leaf cactus, or golden heart epiphyllum.

== Description ==
=== Vegetative characteristics ===
Epiphyllum chrysocardium is a large, epiphytic plant with pale green flat, fleshy stems, up to 1.8 m long, and up to 30 cm wide phylloclades.

=== Generative characteristics ===
The nocturnal, white, fragrant flowers are 30–35 cm long. The filaments are golden yellow. The stigma has 12–13 lobes. The green, globose, 5–6.5 cm long, and 4–5 cm wide fruit is densely covered in bristles.

== Taxonomy ==
It was published by Edward Johnston Alexander in 1956. It used to be the only species in the genus Chiapasophyllum, in addition to a former inclusion in the genus Selenicereus (commonly referred to as the fishbone, ric-rac or zig-zag cacti), but molecular phylogenetic studies show that it belongs to Epiphyllum.

=== Etymology ===
The specific epithet chrysocardium from chryso- meaning gold and -cardium meaning heart means gold-hearted.

== Habitat and distribution ==
It occurs in the Mexican states Chiapas and Tabasco in montane cloud forests.

== Conservation ==
Epiphyllum chrysocardium is a threatened species. The IUCN conservation status is data deficient (DD). The trade falls under the CITES Appendix II regulations.
