= Epiphyllum grandilobum =

Conservation status
- Near Threatened (IUCN 3.1)

Scientific classification
- Kingdom: Plantae
- Clade: Tracheophytes
- Clade: Angiosperms
- Clade: Eudicots
- Order: Caryophyllales
- Family: Cactaceae
- Subfamily: Cactoideae
- Genus: Epiphyllum
- Species: E. grandilobum

Binomial name
- Epiphyllum grandilobum (F.A.C.Weber) Britton & Rose

Synonyms
- Epiphyllum gigas Woodson & Cutak; Phyllocactus grandilobus F.A.C.Weber

Species of cactus

Epiphyllum grandilobum is an epiphytic species of cactus native to Costa Rica, Nicaragua, Panama. This species occurs in elevations of 20 to 1100 m in continuously declining forest habitats, which are threatened by housing and urban areas, tourism and recreational areas, in addition to annual and perennial non-timber crops. The populations are severely fragmented. International trade is restricted to the terms of CITES appendix II, in order to prevent poaching of wild populations. One source suggests the species is also found in Guatemala.

== Etymology ==
The specific epithet grandilobum, meaning "big-lobed", refers to the unusually large lobes of the phyllocladia.
