= Leo Zehntner =

Swiss naturalist (1864–1961)

Leo Zehntner (19 December 1864 in Reigoldswil – 3 April 1961 in Liestal) was a Swiss naturalist.

== Biography ==
He studied natural sciences in Basel and Bern, and following graduation (1890), he worked as an assistant to entomologist Henri Louis Frédéric de Saussure in Geneva. In 1894 he began work as a zoologist at the Pasuruan inspection station on Java, where he dealt with pests that plagued sugar cane plantations. In 1901 in Salatiga (Java) he opened an inspection station for cacao cultivation.

From 1906 to 1918 he served as director of the agricultural institute for the State of Bahia in Brazil, during which, he is credited with the discovery of eight new plant species. In 1920 he returned to Europe, and from 1926 to 1941, he served as mayor of the town of Reigoldswil.

The Malagasy millipede genus Zehntnerobolus commemorates his name, as does taxa with the specific epithet of zehntneri, an example being the cactus species Quiabentia zehntneri.

== Selected works ==
- Histoire naturelle des orthoptères, 1895 (with Henri de Saussure) – Natural history of Orthoptera.
- De plantenluizen van het suikerriet op Java, 1899.
- Myriopoden aus madagaskar und Zanzibar; gesammelt von Dr. A. Voeltzkow, 1901 (with Henri de Saussure) – Myriapoda of Madagascar and Zanzibar; collected by Alfred Voeltzkow.
- Le cacaoyer dans l'état de Bahia, 1914 – On cacao in the State of Bahia.
- Estudo sobre as maniçobas do estado da Bahia, em relação ao problema das seccas, 1914.

== Bibliography ==
- Hollier, John; Willemse, Luc (2018). "Did Leo Zehntner really name a new species of grasshopper in his own honour?". Metalepta. 38 (3): 18–19.
- Hollier, John; Hollier, Anita (2018). "Leo Zehntner, Swiss pioneer of tropical applied entomology". Antenna. 42 (2): 56–60.
