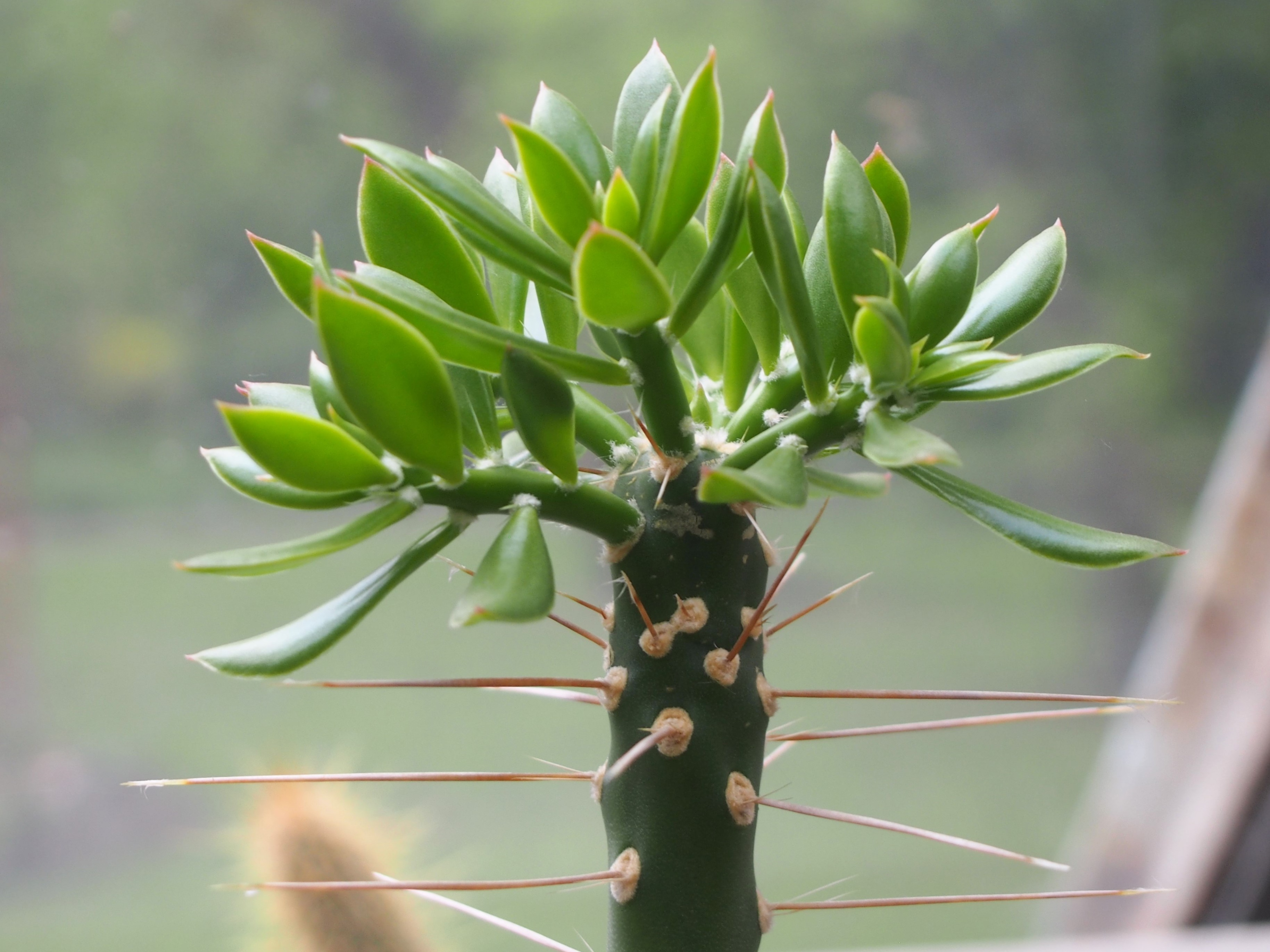

Conservation status
- Least Concern (IUCN 3.1)

Scientific classification
- Kingdom: Plantae
- Clade: Embryophytes
- Clade: Tracheophytes
- Clade: Spermatophytes
- Clade: Angiosperms
- Clade: Eudicots
- Order: Caryophyllales
- Family: Cactaceae
- Genus: Quiabentia
- Species: Q. zehntneri

Binomial name
- Quiabentia zehntneri (Britton & Rose) Britton & Rose

= Quiabentia zehntneri =

Species of cactus

Quiabentia zehntneri is a species of plant in the family Cactaceae. It is endemic to Brazil. It is threatened by habitat loss. Common names are "Quiabento", "Flor de Cera" and "Espinho de São Antonio".

== Description ==
Quiabentia zehntneri grows shrubby with slender green shoots and reaches heights of up to 3 meters. Its 2 to 4 centimeter long leaves are ovate to almost circular and pointed. The shoots are covered with numerous short white spines.

The bright pink-red flowers are 3 to 4 centimeters long and reach 7 to 8 centimeters in diameter.

== Distribution and habitat ==
Quiabentia zehntneri is distributed in northeastern Brazil on rocks in the open Caatinga vegetation at altitudes of 450 to 750 meters. Its natural habitats are subtropical or tropical dry forests and subtropical or tropical dry shrubland.

== Taxonomy ==
The first description as Pereskia zehntneri was made in 1919 by Nathaniel Lord Britton and Joseph Nelson Rose. The specific epithet Zehntneri honors the Swiss biologist Leo Zehntner. In the appendix to the fourth volume of their work The Cactaceae, the two authors created the new genus Quiabentia for the species in 1923. Another nomenclature synonym is Grusonia Zehntneri (Britton & Rose) G.D.Rowley (2006).
