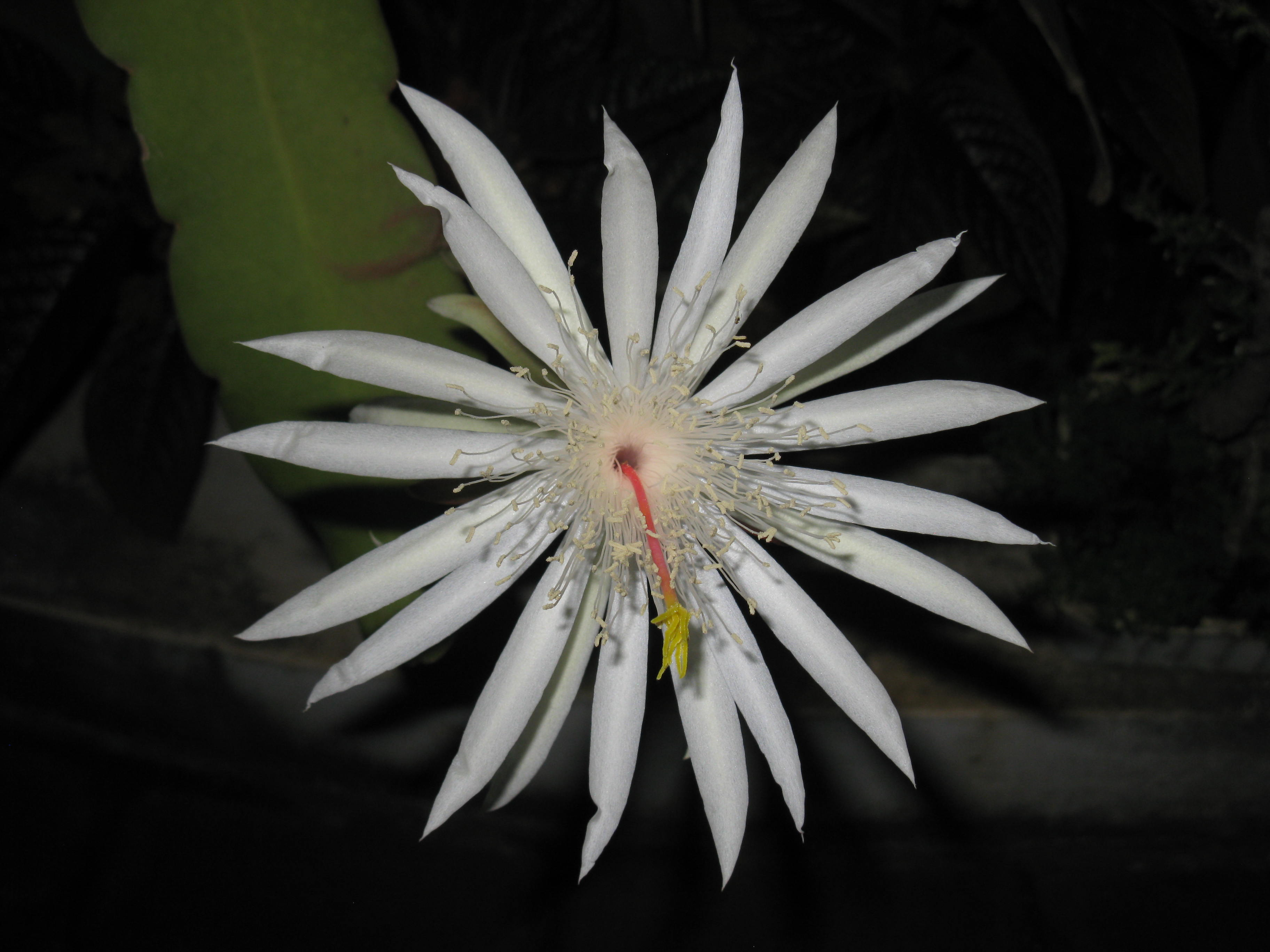

Scientific classification
- Kingdom: Plantae
- Clade: Tracheophytes
- Clade: Angiosperms
- Clade: Eudicots
- Order: Caryophyllales
- Family: Cactaceae
- Subfamily: Cactoideae
- Genus: Epiphyllum
- Species: E. hookeri

Binomial name
- Epiphyllum hookeri Haw.

Synonyms
- Cereus hookeri (Haw.) Pfeifer; Cereus marginatus Salm-Dyck; Epiphyllum phyllanthus subsp. hookeri (Haw.) U.Guzmán; Epiphyllum phyllanthus var. hookeri (Haw.) Kimnach; Epiphyllum stenopetalum (C.F.Först.) Britton & Rose; Epiphyllum strictum (Lem.) Britton & Rose; Phyllocactus hookeri (Haw.) Salm-Dyck; Phyllocactus stenopetalus Salm-Dyck; Phyllocactus strictus Lem.

= Epiphyllum hookeri =

Species of cactus

Epiphyllum hookeri is a species of climbing cactus in the Epiphyllum genus. It forms showy white flowers and is native from Mexico through Central America to Venezuela. A perennial, it was introduced to Florida and some West Indian islands.

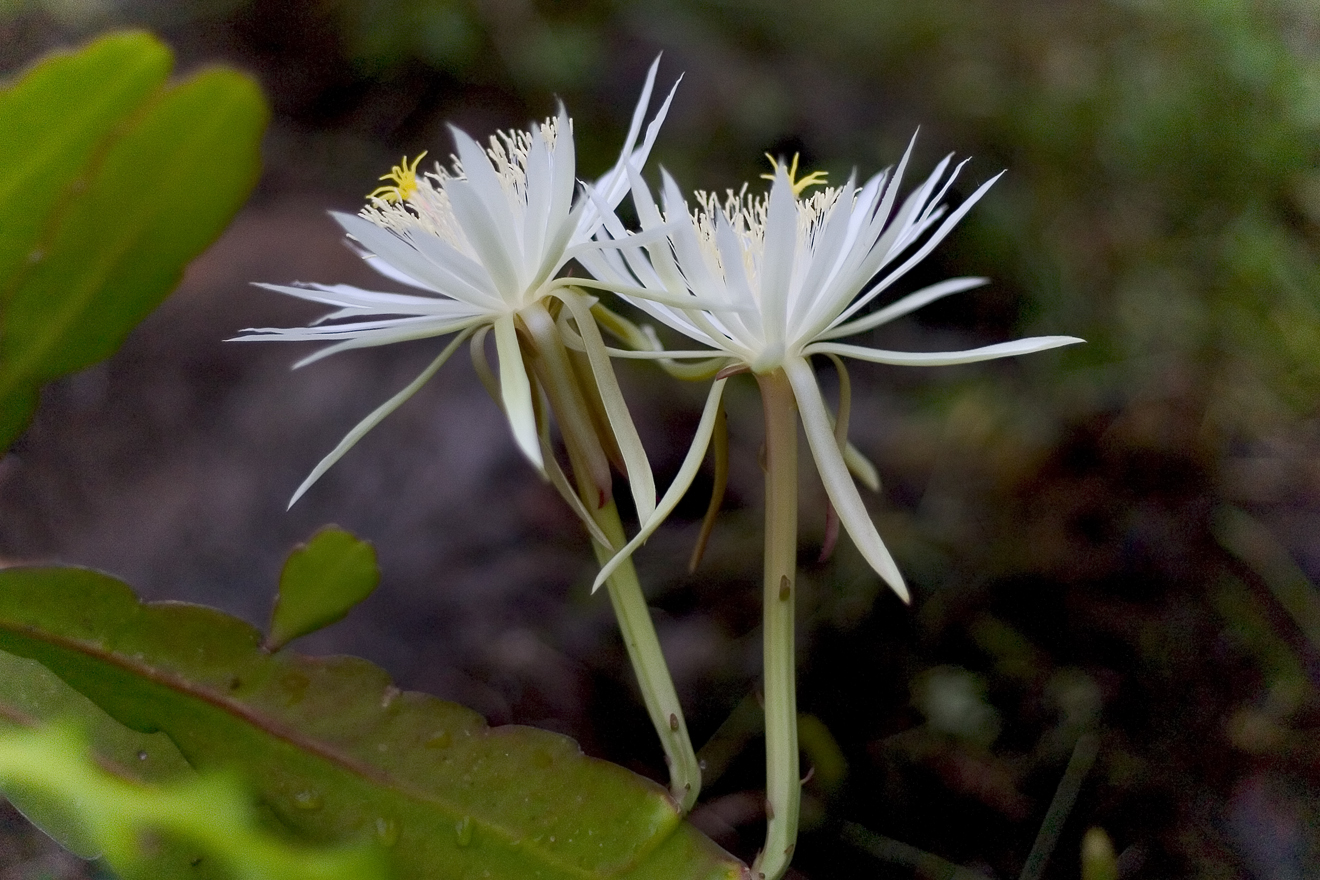
Side shot of twin blooms
