= Pereskiopsis diguetii =

Conservation status
- Least Concern (IUCN 3.1)

Scientific classification
- Kingdom: Plantae
- Clade: Tracheophytes
- Clade: Angiosperms
- Clade: Eudicots
- Order: Caryophyllales
- Family: Cactaceae
- Genus: Pereskiopsis
- Species: P. diguetii

Binomial name
- Pereskiopsis diguetii (F.A.C.Weber) Britton & Rose
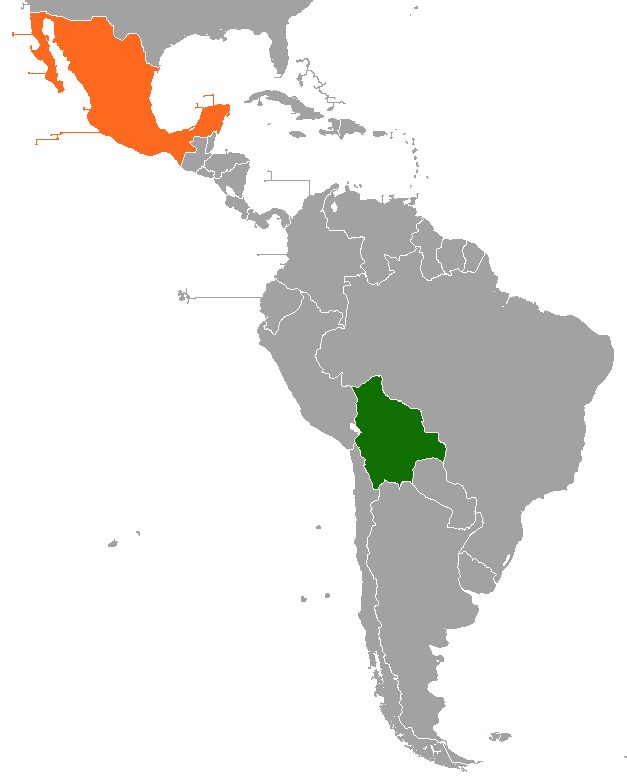
- Pereskiopsis diguetii is native to Bolivia and Mexico

Synonyms
- Grusonia diguetii (F.A.C.Weber) G.D.Rowley; Opuntia diguetii F.A.C.Weber; Opuntia spathulata (Otto ex Pfeiff.) F.A.C.Weber; Pereskia crassicaulis Zucc. ex Pfeiff.; Pereskia higuerana Cárdenas; Pereskia spathulata Otto ex Pfeiff.; Pereskiopsis spathulata (Otto ex Pfeiff.) Britton & Rose; Pereskiopsis velutina Rose; Rhodocactus higueranus (Cárdenas) Backeb.

Species of plant

Pereskiopsis diguetii, commonly known in Spanish as cacto arbusto patilón among other names, is a species of succulent flowering plant in the genus Pereskiopsis, within the family Cactaceae. It is native to the Mexican states of Guanajuato, Guerrero, Jalisco, México, Michoacán, Morelos, Nayarit, Querétaro, and Oaxaca.

== Description ==
Trunk with spines

Pereskiopsis diguetii is a species of cactus with a shrubby growth form that grows to 0.5-2 m in height, although it can occasionally reach 4 m. It exhibits branching from its base and develops a trunk measuring 3-7 cm in diameter, with dark brown to dark gray bark. The branches are semi-climbing, pubescent, and dark green in color; they become tinged with red during dry periods. They measure 4-8 mm in diameter.

The leaves are persistent, and measure 2-6 cm in length and 1.5-3 cm in width. They are ovate or occasionally lanceolate in shape. The apices are acuminate or acute. The surfaces of the leaves are pubescent and dark green in color. The veins are more conspicuous on new growth.

Spines and leaves

The areoles on the branches measure 3-4 mm in length and 2.5-4 mm in width; those on the trunk measure 6-8 mm in length and up to 7 mm in width. They have off-white trichomes, especially on young branches. The glochids are abundant on the branches and are less so on the trunk. They measure approximately 2 mm in length and are light brown to dark brown in color. The areoles on the branches have 1-5 spines each, which measure 2-7 cm in length and 1-1.2 mm thick at the base. The number of spines per areole changes with age. The areoles on the trunk grow 0-12 straight spines, which measure 1.5-7 cm in length. The flowers develop at the tips of the stems, and are yellow in color. They measure 3-7.5 cm in length and 3.2-4.5 cm in diameter when fully open. The pericarpel measures 1.5-2.2 cm in length; it is generally turbinate or slightly subglobose in shape. Its surface is pubescent and dark green in color. The receptacle develops 8-13 bracts, which measure 0.5-3 cm in length and 0.3-1.8 cm in width and vary in shape from suborbicular to elliptical. They are dark green in color. The pericarpel has 10-15 areoles with light yellow or gray tomenta, off-white trichomes, and red-brown to occasionally light yellow glochids measuring 2-3 mm in length.

There are 12-14 tepals per flower; these are arranged in two series. The external tepals measure 0.6-2 cm in length and 0.4-1.4 cm in width. They have mucronate apices and are yellow in color; occasionally, on their upper-middle regions, they may have a red stripe. The internal tepals measure 2-2.4 cm in length and 1.3-1.6 cm in width. They are narrowly or widely obovate in shape and yellow in color.

Plant with mature fruits

The flower has 100-170 stamens, which each measure 5-12 mm in length. The filaments are yellow-green at the base and light yellow towards the apex. The anthers are an intense yellow color, and measure 1.5-1.8 mm in length and 0.4-0.5 mm in width. The style is straight and yellow in color, and measures 1.4-1.8 cm in length. The stigma has 5-6 light yellow lobes, which measure 3-4 mm in length. The flowers are perfect. The fruits measure 2.5-7 cm in length and 1-1.6 cm in width. They are turbinate in shape, and have a pubescent surface. They are orange or yellow in color, and can occasionally be tinged with red. The umbilical zone around where the fruit is attached to its pedicel is sunken, with a depth of 0.5-2 mm and a width of 6-8 mm. The fruits have 12-23 areoles with light gray tomenta, trichomes, and numerous red-brown to light yellow glochids measuring 2-3 mm in length. The pulp is light yellow and is sour in flavor. It takes approximately a year for the fruits to mature; they fully ripen at around the same time as the next year's flowering.

Each fruit contains 0-34 light gray seeds, which measure 3-4 or occasionally up to 5 mm in length and 1.5-3 mm in width. On their surfaces, they have sticky hairs.

== Distribution and habitat ==
Pereskiopsis diguetii is native to Mexico, where it is found in the states of Guanajuato, Guerrero, Jalisco, México, Michoacán, Morelos, Nayarit, Querétaro, and Oaxaca.

It is mainly found in the seasonally-dry tropical biome, from altitudes of 0 to 1900 meters above sea level. Its primary habitat consists of deciduous tropical forests, but it also grows in spiny forests, dry scrublands, and disturbed areas.

== Ecology ==
Pereskiopsis diguetii has perfect flowers and primarily reproduces via cross-pollination. The characteristics of the flowers, including their diameter, their yellow tepals, and their high pollen production suggest that this species is mainly pollinated by bees and butterflies.

The fruits, which contain a small amount of pulp, are part of the diet of birds and small rodents, which widen the distribution of this species by spreading the seeds.

Furthermore, the plant may be propagated asexually via the fruit itself; the areoles present on the pericarpel are able to develop stems when the fruit falls off the plant and comes into contact with soil. This high capacity for vegetative propagation has likely contributed to this species' wide distribution and its ability to colonize disturbed areas.

Flower being pollinated by a bee

== Taxonomy ==
Pereskiopsis diguetii was first described as Opuntia diguetii, a name published in 1898 by the French botanist Frédéric Albert Constantin Weber in the scientific journal Bulletin du Muséum d'Histoire Naturelle: 4: 166.

Later, the American botanists Nathaniel Lord Britton and Joseph Nelson Rose transferred it to the genus Pereskiopsis, renaming it Pereskiopsis diguetii. They registered these changes in the scientific journal Smithsonian Miscellaneous Collections 50: 332, published in 1907.

Etymology

- Pereskiopsis: The genus name is derived from the name of the unrelated but similar-looking genus Pereskia and the Greek suffix -opsis (meaning "appearing similar to"), referring to the resemblance borne to Pereskia by the plants in this genus. Some authors have also used the incorrect spelling Peireskiopsis.
- diguetii: The specific epithet honors the French explorer Léon Diguet (1859 - 1926), who collected the plant material on which Weber based his description of this species.

Synonyms

- Grusonia diguetii (FACWeber) GDRowley, 2006
- Opuntia diguetii F.ACWeber, 1898 (basionym)
- Opuntia spathulata (Otto ex Pfeiff.) FACWeber, 1898
- Pereskia crassicaulis Zucc. ex Pfeiff., 1837
- Pereskia higuerana Cárdenas, 1964
- Pereskia spathulata Otto ex Pfeiff., 1837
- Pereskiopsis diguetii subsp. spathulata (Otto ex Pfeiff.) MHJvan der Meer, 2019
- Pereskiopsis spathulata (Otto ex Pfeiff.) Britton & Rose, 1907
- Pereskiopsis velutina Rose, 1907
- Rhodocactus higueranus (Cárdenas) Backeb., 1966

== Conservation status ==
On the IUCN Red List, Pereskiopsis diguetii is classified as being Least Concern (LC), which signified that it currently faces a low risk of extinction due to its wide geographic distribution, the abundance and stability of its populations, and the absence of significant known threats to its survival on a global scale.

However, it faces several localized threats, including rapid change in land use for infrastructural development and the destruction of forests to use land for livestock grazing. These activities reduce and change the habitats occupied by this species. Even so, as with other Pereskiopsis species, Pereskiopsis diguetii has a capacity to tolerate habitat disturbance.

== Cultivation ==
Pereskiopsis diguetii is mainly cultivated as an ornamental. It may be propagated vegetatively via cuttings. It may also be used as a living fence due to its vigorous growth and its spines and glochids.

Furthermore, it is often sold under its synonym Pereskiopsis spathulata as a grafting stock for small scions (such as seedlings or areoles) of other cactus species since it has the capability to greatly increase the growth rate of these scions due to its own vigorous growth, potentially growing seedlings to flowering size in a matter of months instead of multiple years.

== Common names ==
In Mexico, Pereskiopsis diguetii has many common names in Spanish. These include alfilerillo, cacto arbusto patilón, cactus arbusto patilón, cola de Judas, cola de diablo, cola del diablo, nopaleta, nopalitos, patillón, patilona, patilón, pititache, and tasajillo.

== Gallery ==
In habitat in La Joya, El Pueblito, Querétaro, Mexico

Leaves

Flower buds

Flowers

Fruit
