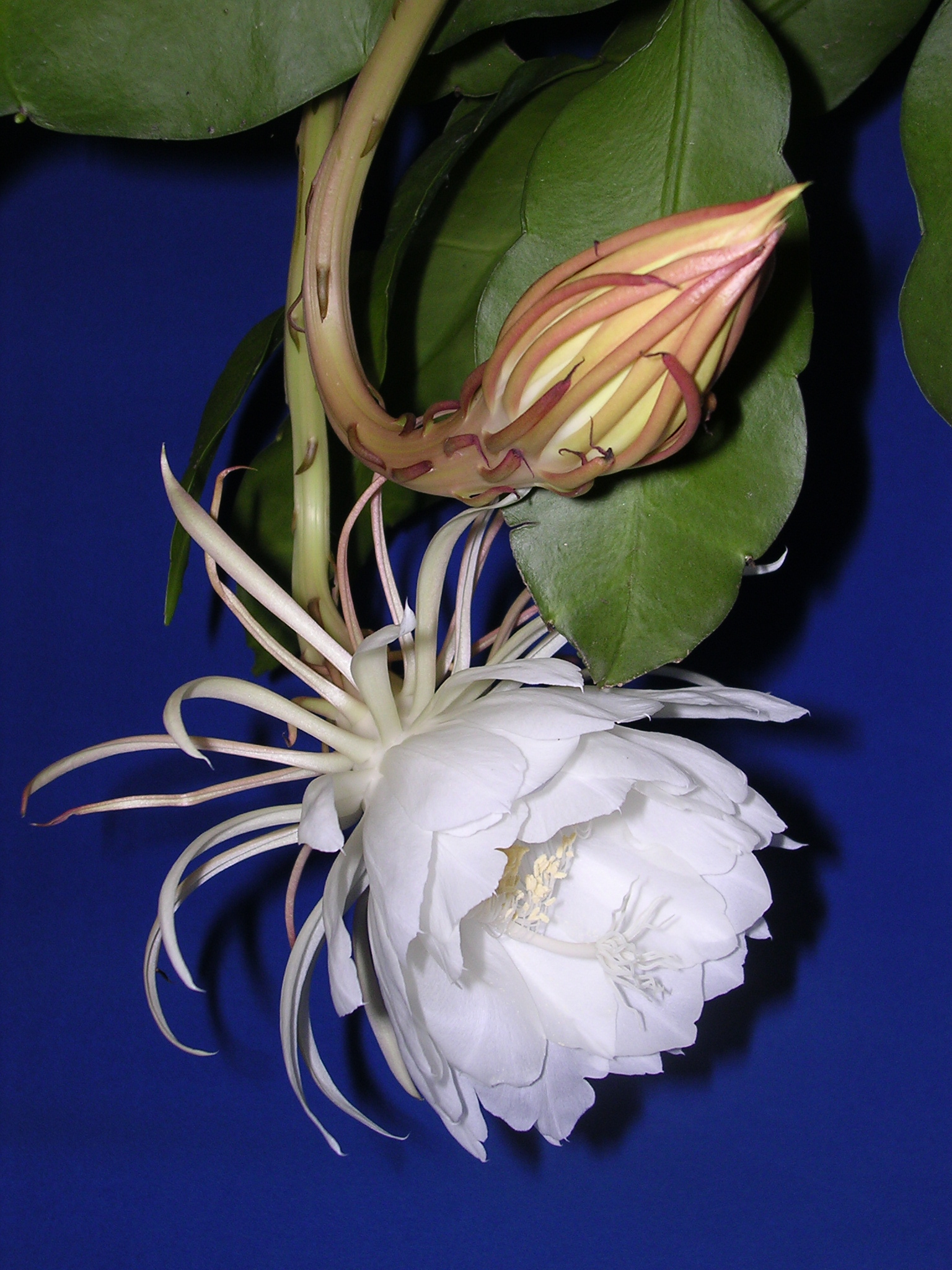

Conservation status
- Least Concern (IUCN 3.1)

Scientific classification
- Kingdom: Plantae
- Clade: Embryophytes
- Clade: Tracheophytes
- Clade: Angiosperms
- Clade: Eudicots
- Order: Caryophyllales
- Family: Cactaceae
- Subfamily: Cactoideae
- Genus: Epiphyllum
- Species: E. oxypetalum

Binomial name
- Epiphyllum oxypetalum (DC.) Haworth

Synonyms
- Cactus oxypetalus Moc. & Sessé ex DC.; Cereus latifrons Zucc.; Cereus oxypetalus DC.; Epiphyllum acuminatum K.Schum.; Epiphyllum grande (Lem.) Britton & Rose; Epiphyllum latifrons (Zucc.) Pfeiff.; Epiphyllum purpusii (Weing.) F.M.Knuth; Phyllocactus acuminatus (K. Schum.) K. Schum.; Phyllocactus grandis Lem.; Phyllocactus latifrons (Zucc.) Link ex Walp.; Phyllocactus oxypetalus (DC.) Link; Phyllocactus purpusii Weing.

= Epiphyllum oxypetalum =

Species of cactus

Epiphyllum oxypetalum, the Dutchman's pipe cactus, princess of the night or queen of the night, is a species of cactus with a native range from Mexico to Nicaragua. It blooms nocturnally, and its flowers wilt before dawn. Though it is sometimes referred to as a night-blooming cereus, it is not closely related to any of the species in the tribe Cereeae that are more commonly known by that name. All Cereus species bloom at night and are terrestrial plants; Epiphyllum species are usually epiphytic.

== Description ==
The stems are erect, ascending, scandent, or sprawling and profusely branched. The primary stems are terete, up to 6 metres (20 ft) long, flattened laterally, and ligneous at their bases. The secondary stems are flat, elliptic-acuminate, up to 30 cm × 12 cm (12 in × 5 in). The stem margins are shallowly through deeply crenate and undulate. Stems appear to be waxy therefore cutin may be present. Cutin reduces water loss from stems. A gel-like substance oozes out of stem cuts. Stems contain much water-filled tissue.

=== Flowers ===
The flowers are nocturnal. They grow on flattened stems and are up to 30 cm (12 in) long and 17 cm (7 in) wide, and very fragrant. The principal odor components in the aroma are benzyl salicylate and methyl linoleate. Pericarpels are nude, slightly angled, and green. Bracteoles are short and narrow up through ca. 10 mm (0.39 in) long. Receptacles are up through 20 cm (8 in) long, 1 cm (0.4 in) thick, brownish, and arching. The outer tepals are linear, acute, 8–10 cm (3.1–3.9 in) long, and reddish through amber. The inner tepals are whitish, oblanceolate or oblong, acuminate, up through 8–10 cm long and 2.5 cm (0.98 in) wide. The stamens are greenish white or white, slender and weak. The styles are greenish white, pale yellow, or white, 4 mm (0.16 in) thick, as long as inner tepals, and with many lobes.

The fruits are oblong, up through 12 x 8 cm, purplish red, and angled.

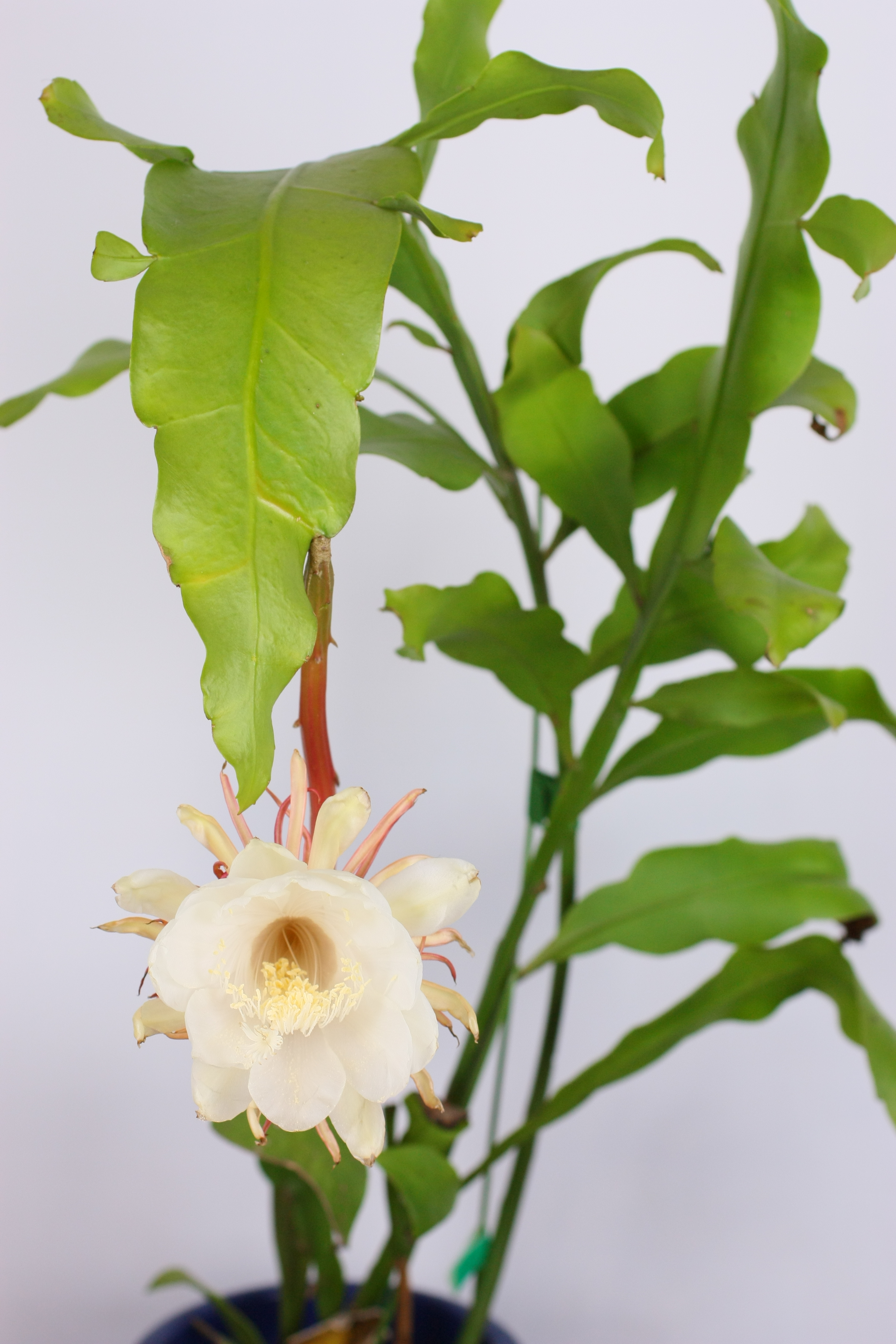

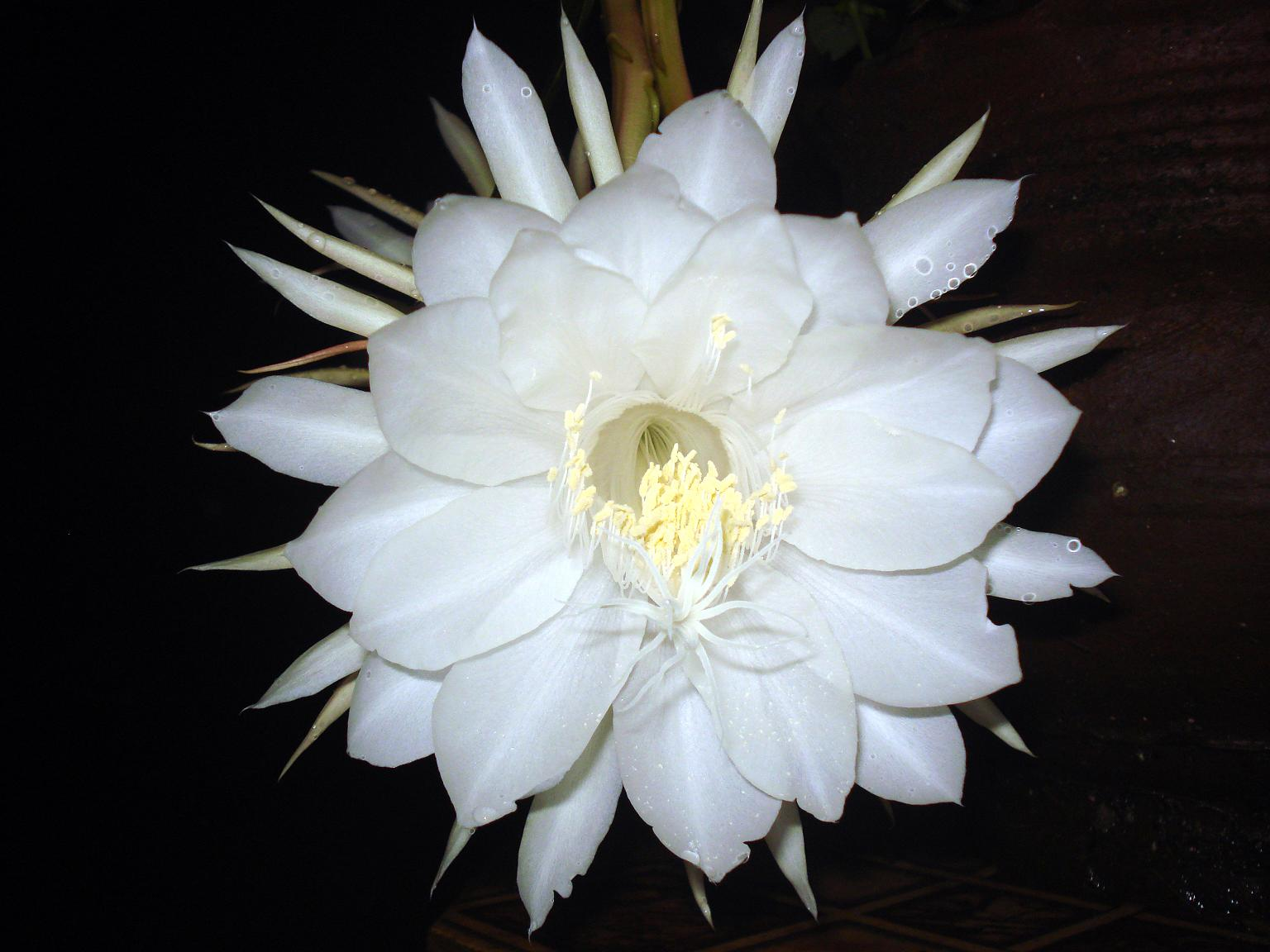

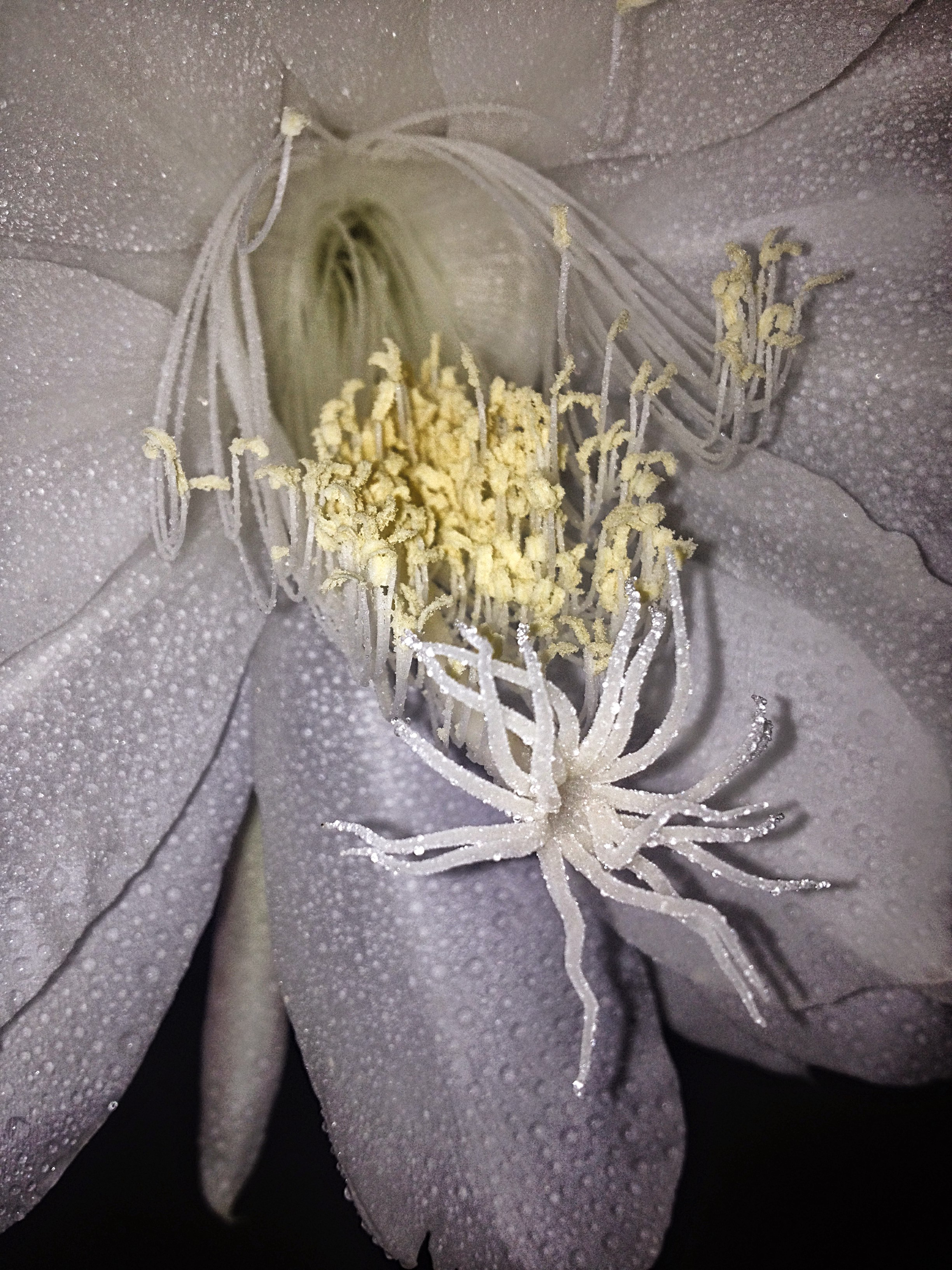
Detail of the reproductive parts of a bloom

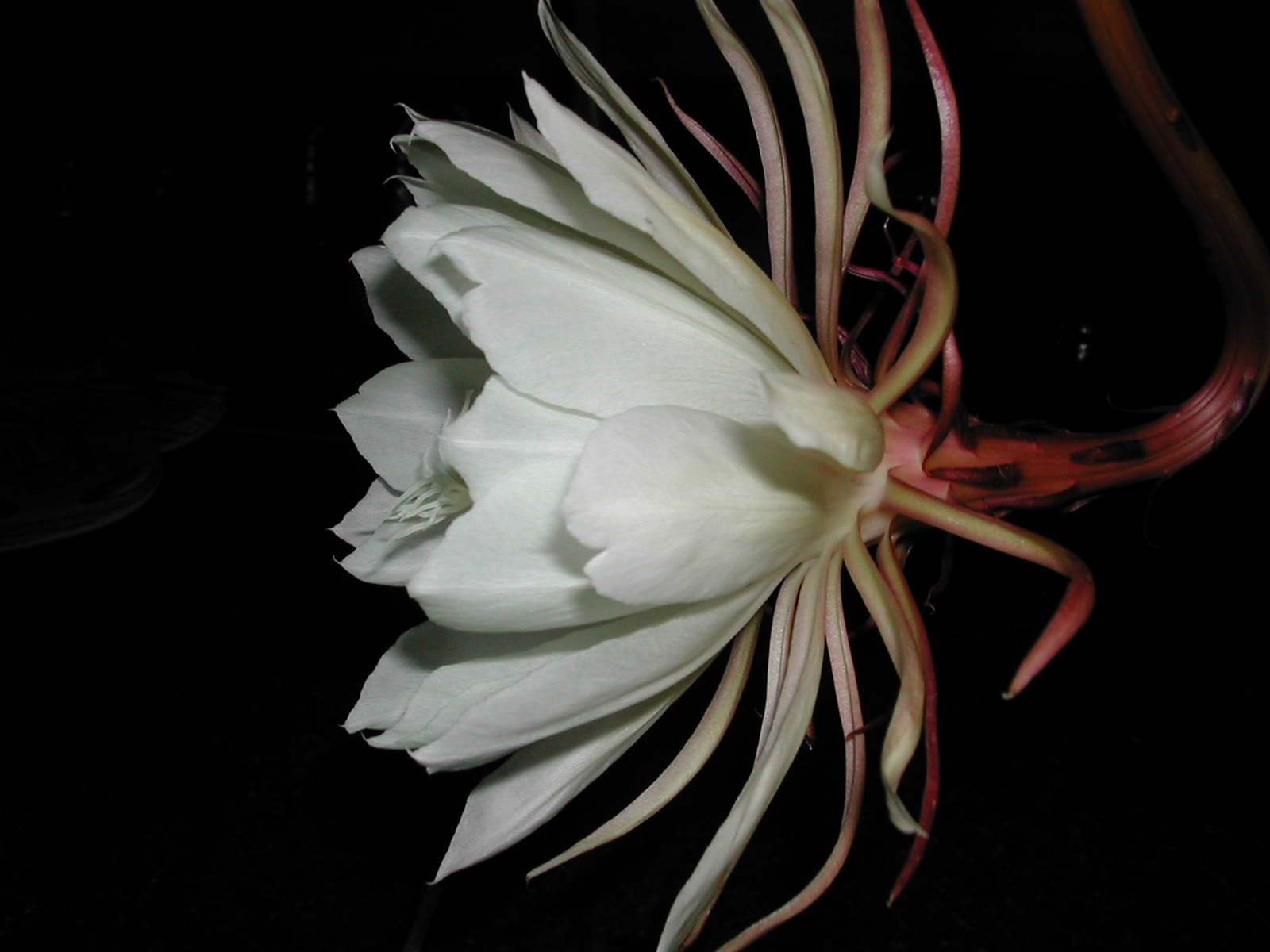
Side view of an open flower

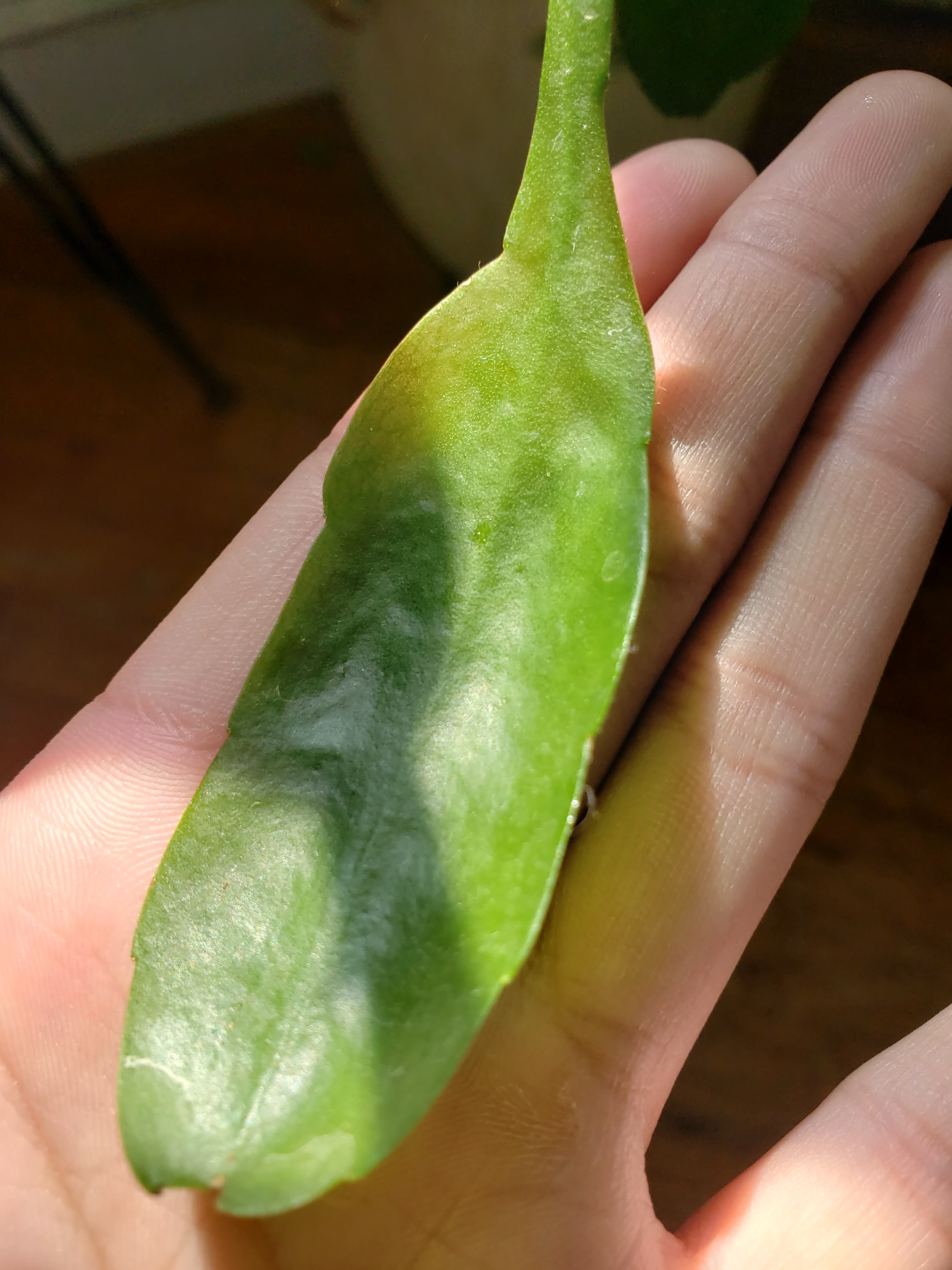
Young stem

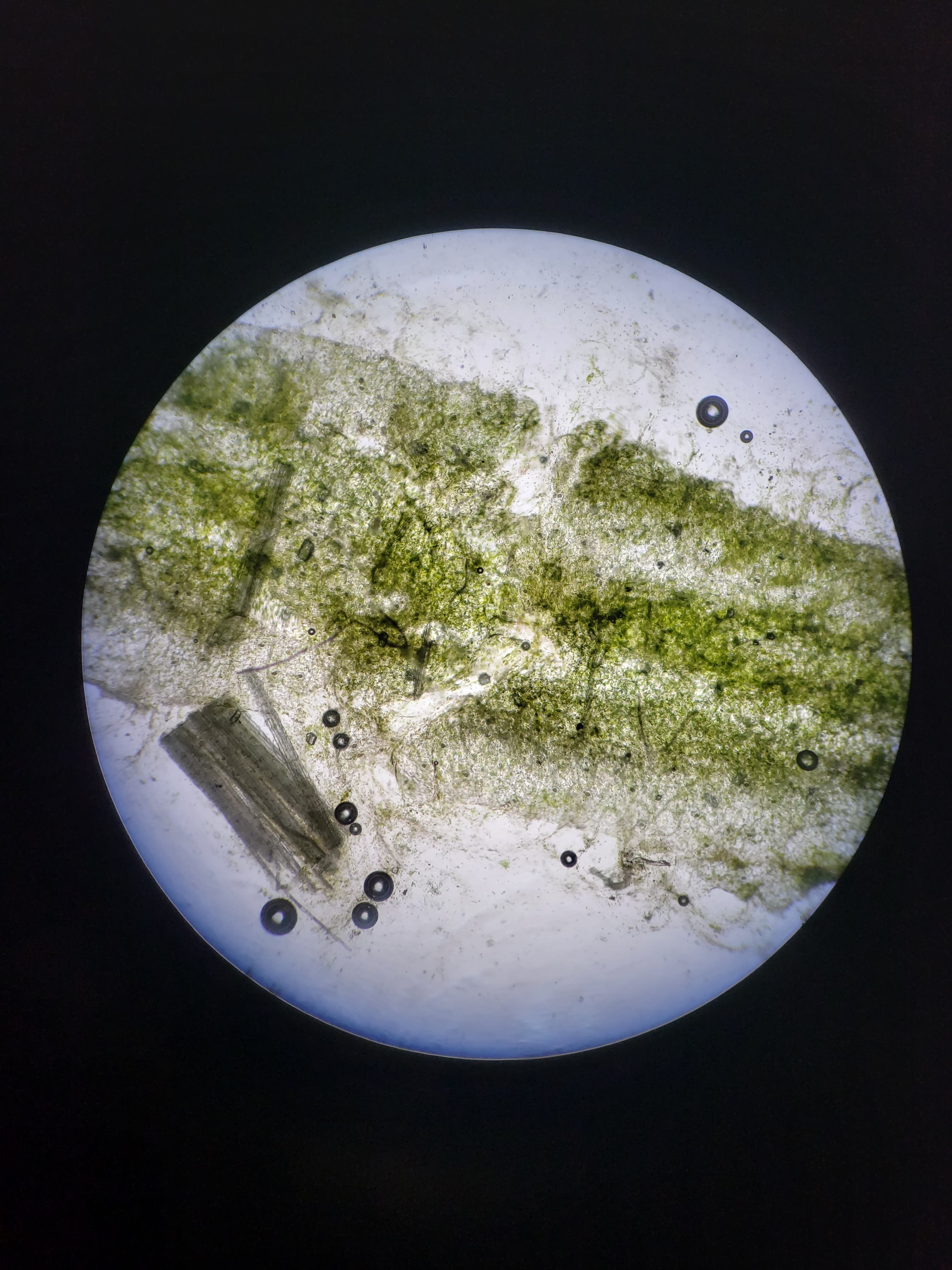
Cross section of stem under a microscope

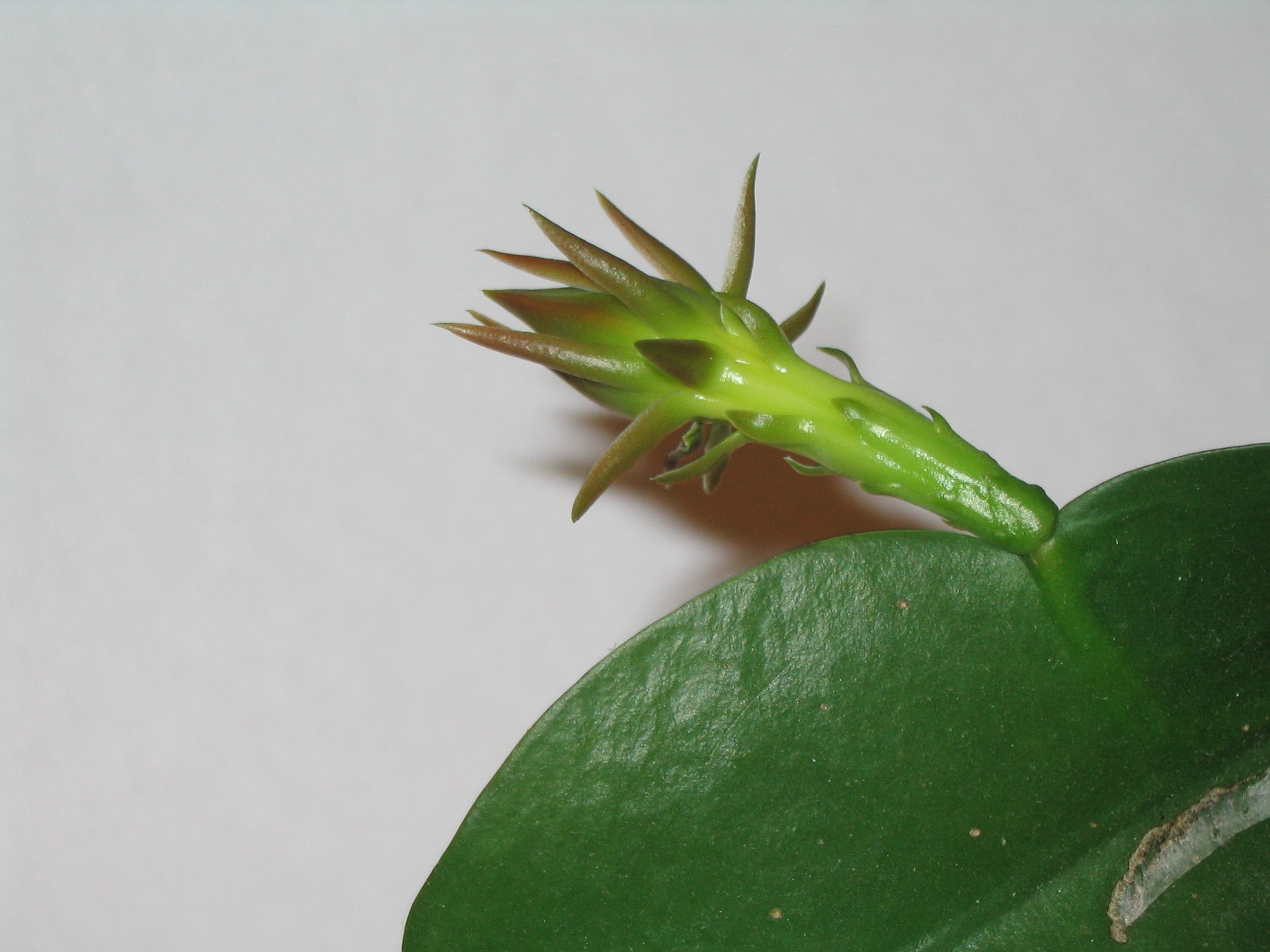
Bud

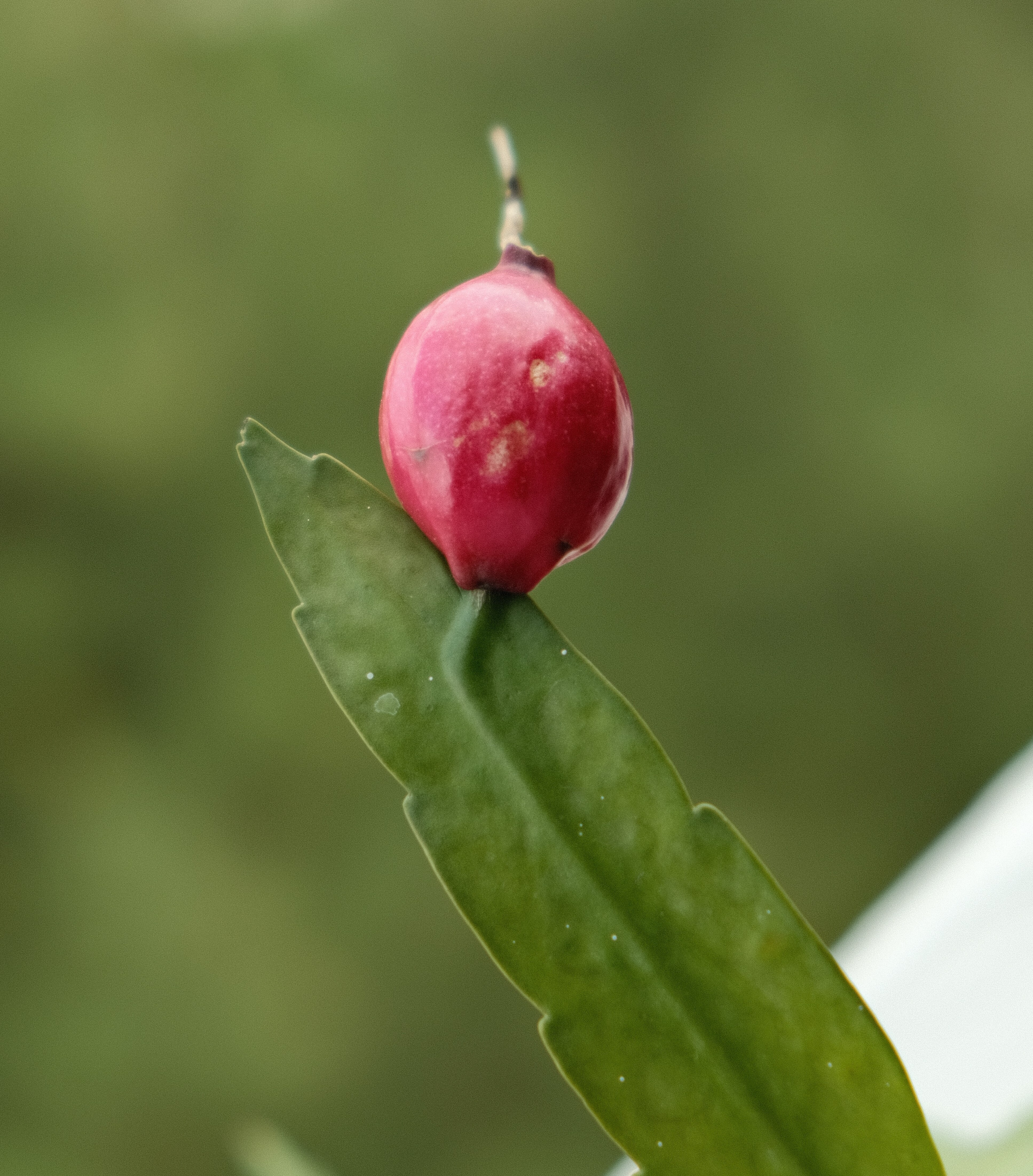
Fruit

== Systematics ==
This species is closely related to E. thomasianum and E. pumilum, but quite distinct from them. In 1909, C. A. Purpus collected a slightly different type in St. Ana, Orizaba, Mexico. It has carmine red outer petals and the flowers have an unpleasant smell, rather than being fragrant. It was originally named Phyllocactus purpusii, but is now included within this species.

== Range ==
Epiphyllum oxypetalum is native to Southern Mexico and to extensive areas of South America. It is widely cultivated, with many escapes from cultivation in tropical areas, especially in southeast Asia. It has become naturalised in China.

== Cultivation and uses ==
Epiphyllum oxypetalum is an easily cultivated, fast growing Epiphyllum. It flowers in late spring through late summer; large specimens can produce several crops of flowers in one season. This is a widely cultivated Epiphyllum species.

It is known to have medicinal properties in many Asian cultures, including India, Vietnam, and Malaysia. The plant is widely used in traditional medicine to treat respiratory ailments, bleeding conditions, and is also believed to have the property of reducing pain and inflammation.

In the popular movie Crazy Rich Asians, based on the novel by Kevin Kwan, the characters organise parties to watch the brief blooming of the plant known in Chinese as tan hua (simplified Chinese: 昙花; traditional Chinese: 曇花; pinyin: tánhuā).
