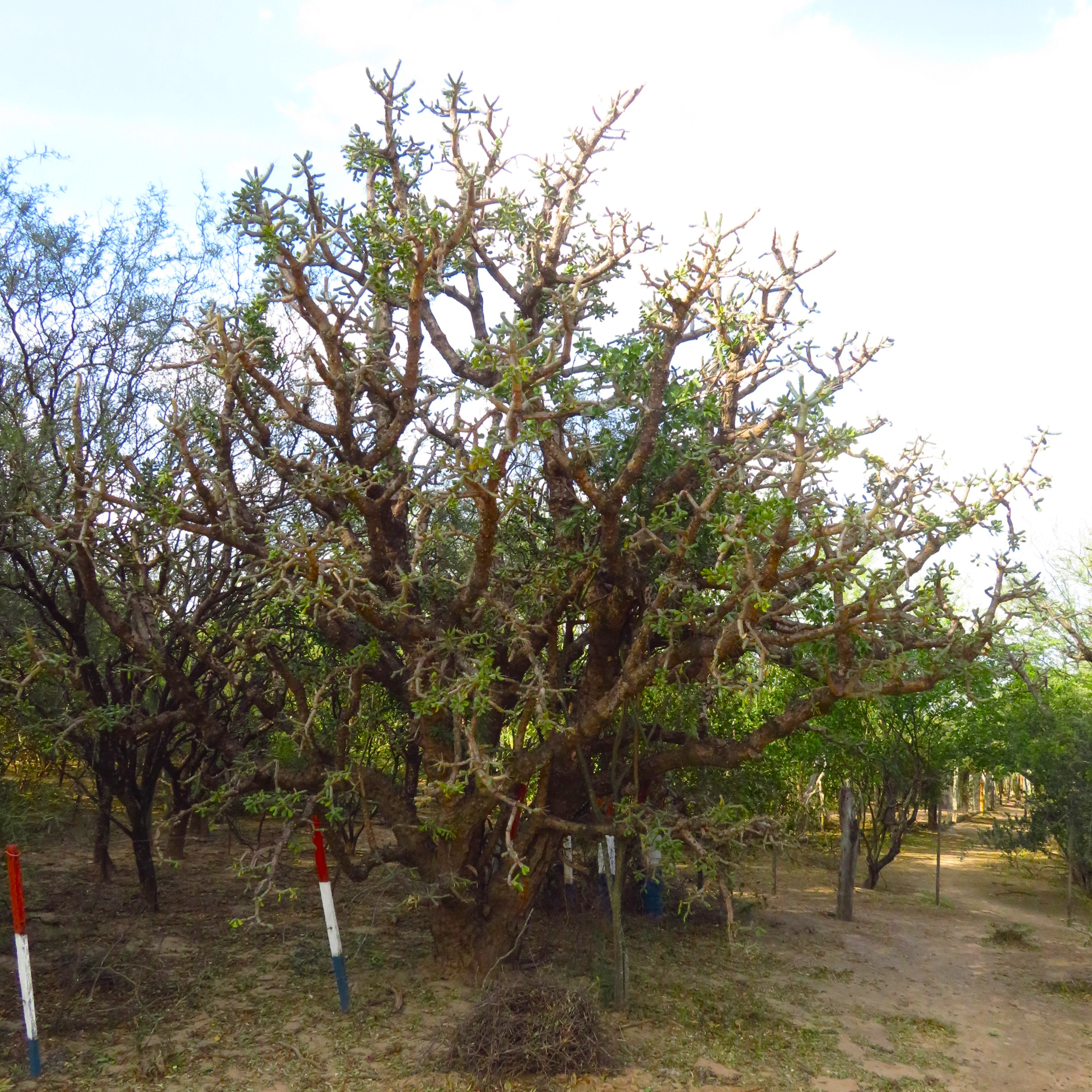
- Mature specimen at Fortín Toledo in Boquerón, Paraguay

Conservation status
- Least Concern (IUCN 3.1)

Scientific classification
- Kingdom: Plantae
- Clade: Tracheophytes
- Clade: Angiosperms
- Clade: Eudicots
- Order: Caryophyllales
- Family: Cactaceae
- Genus: Quiabentia
- Species: Q. verticillata

Binomial name
- Quiabentia verticillata (Vaupel) Borg

Synonyms
- Grusonia verticillata (Vaupel) G.D.Rowley 2006; Pereskia verticillata Vaupel 1923; Pereskia pflanzii Vaupel 1923; Quiabentia chacoensis Backeb. in C.Backeberg & F.M.Knuth, 1936; Quiabentia chacoensis var. jujuyensis Backeb.1956 publ. 1957; Quiabentia pereziensis Backeb. 1956 publ. 1957; Quiabentia pflanzii (Vaupel) Borg 1937

= Quiabentia verticillata =

Species of cactus

Quiabentia verticillata is a species of cactus found in the neotropical forests of the Gran Chaco region (eastern Bolivia, western Paraguay, northern Argentina, and parts of Brazil).

== Description ==
It is an erect woody succulent plant, growing tree-shaped or shrub-like and reaches heights of 2–15 m (7–49 ft). Its leaves, which are approximately 5 cm (2 in) long and up to 2 cm (1 in) wide, are oval to lanceolate (long, wider in the middle, shaped like a lance tip). Like many cacti, it bears leaves which have become specialized as spines. The spines (up to 7 cm (3 in) long) consist of the stipules of the leaves, and protect the plant from browsing by herbivores. It also bears a second type of leaf that is thickened and fleshy, with a somewhat angular cross-section. These leaves and the stems of the plant enable the storage of water. The bright red flowers are 1.5 centimeters long.

== Distribution ==
Quiabentia verticillata is found in the neotropical forests of the Gran Chaco region (eastern Bolivia, western Paraguay, northern Argentina, and parts of Brazil). It grows in dry sandy soils, typically found at the edge of fields, in wastelands, at the side of roads, and opportunistically in vineyards and orchards when they are not irrigated.

== Taxonomy ==
The first description (as Pereskia verticillata) was made in 1923 by Friedrich Karl Johann Vaupel. The specific epithet "verticillata" comes from Latin, means "whorled" and refers to the shape of the branching of the shoots of the species. Curt Backeberg reassigned the species to genus Quiabentia in 1936. Other nomenclature synonyms are Quiabentia verticillata (Vaupel) Borg (1937) and Grusonia verticillata (Vaupel) G.D. Rowley (2006).

== Cultivation and uses ==
Like most cacti, it is a xerophyte, capable of growing in areas receiving very little precipitation. It has a laterally extensive, shallow root system.

== Gallery ==
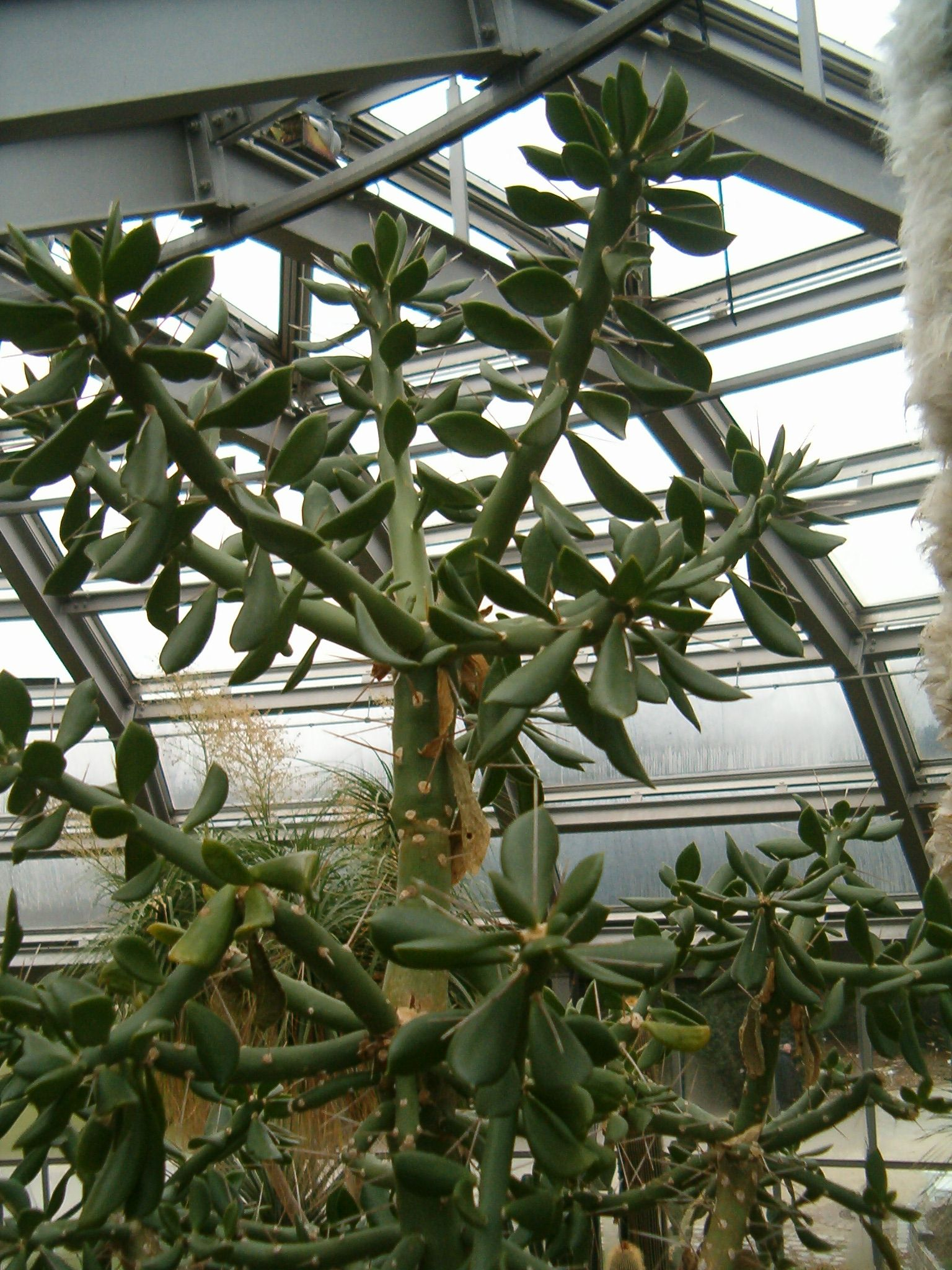
Specimen at the Berlin Botanical Garden and Botanical Museum in Germany

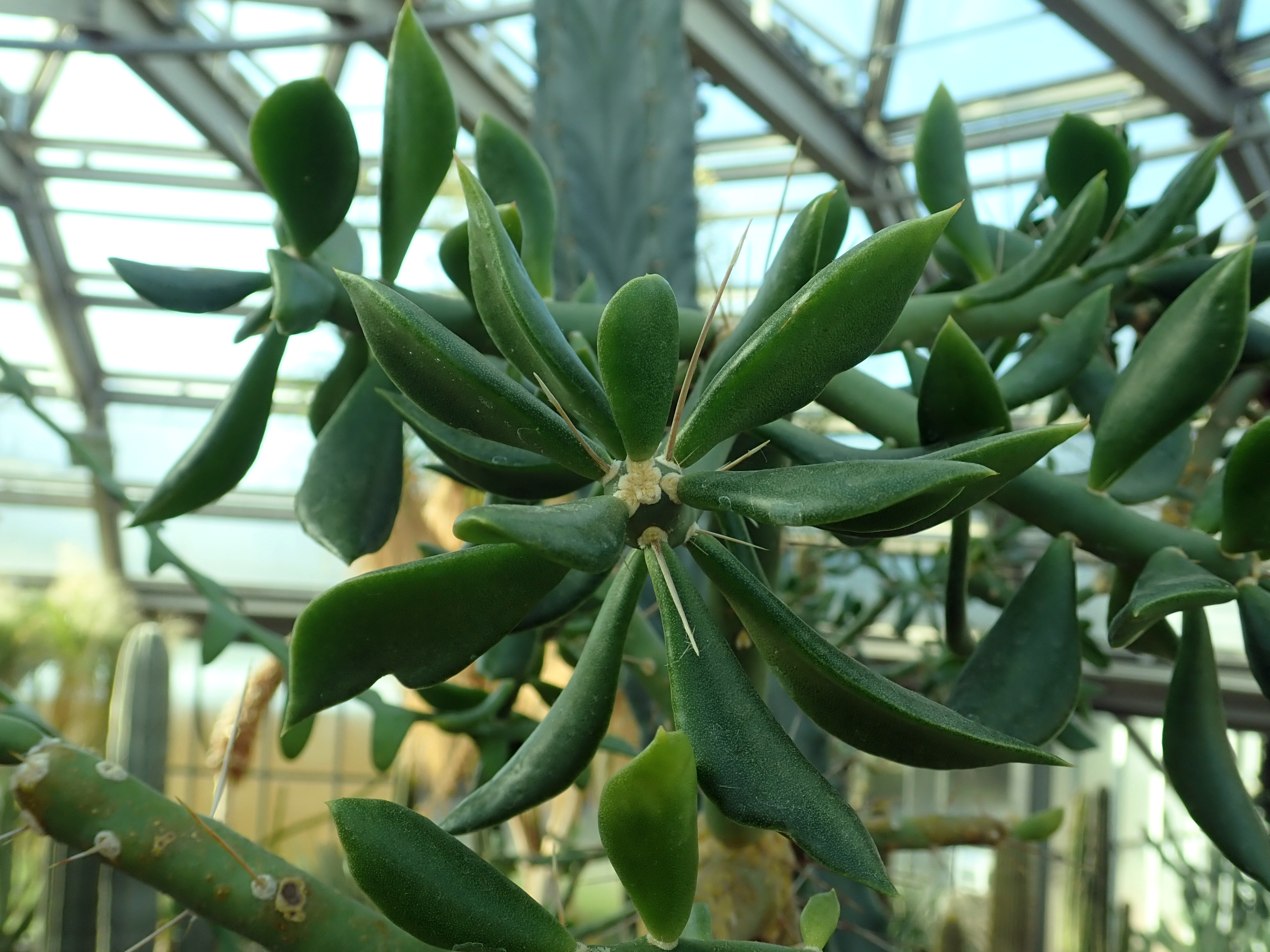
Detail of fleshy leaves

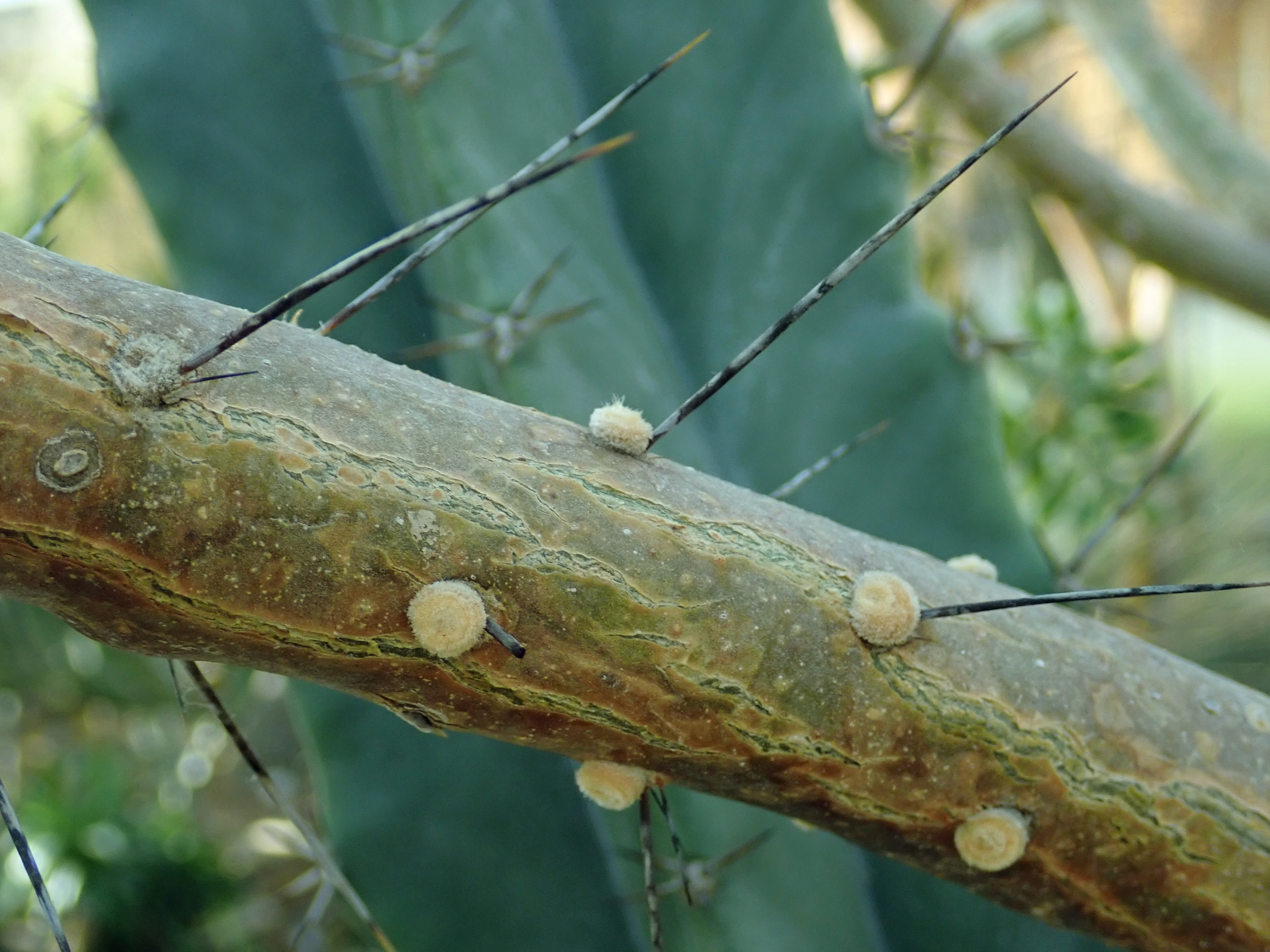
Detail of spines
