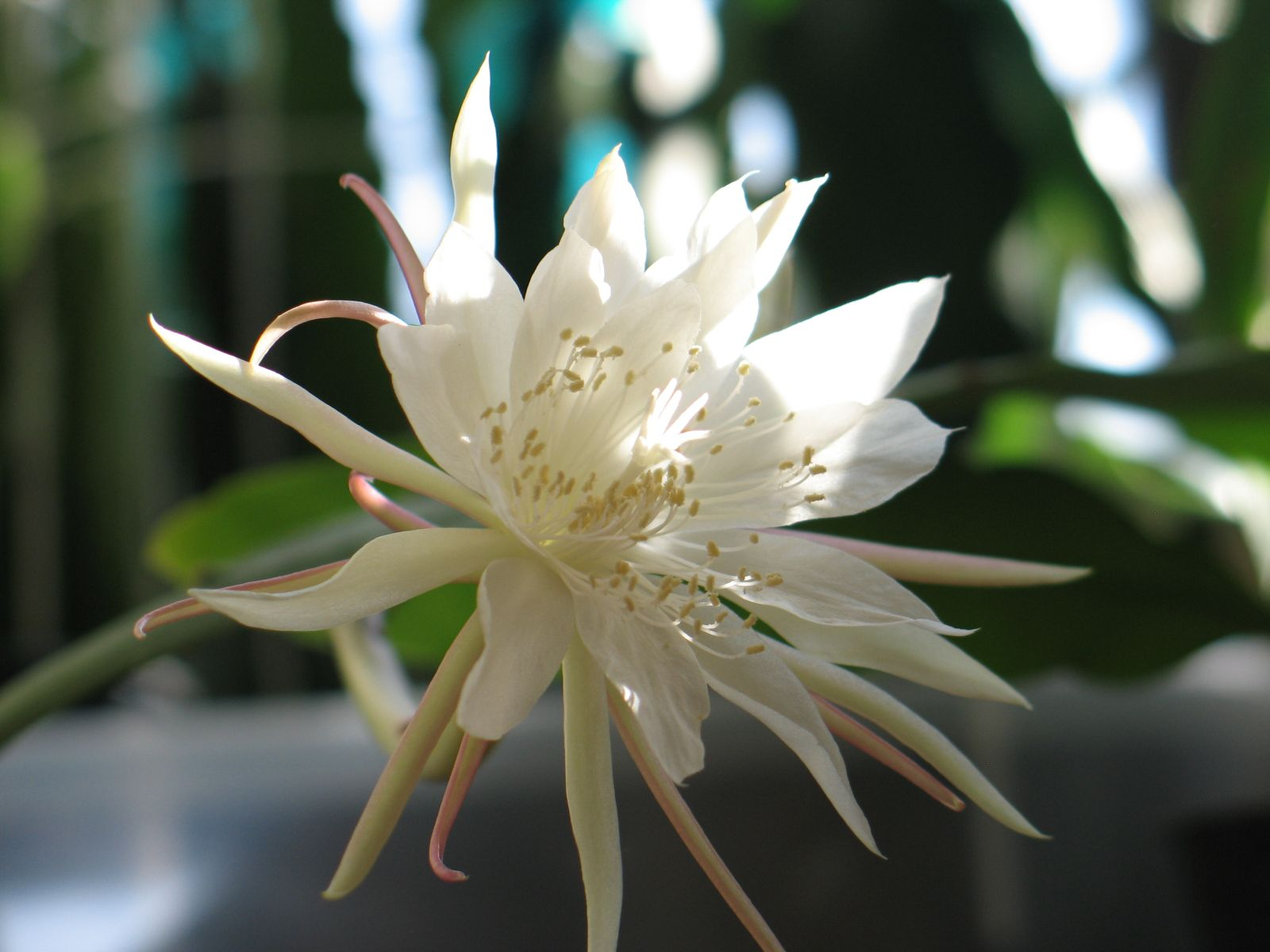

Conservation status
- Least Concern (IUCN 3.1)

Scientific classification
- Kingdom: Plantae
- Clade: Tracheophytes
- Clade: Angiosperms
- Clade: Eudicots
- Order: Caryophyllales
- Family: Cactaceae
- Subfamily: Cactoideae
- Genus: Epiphyllum
- Species: E. pumilum

Binomial name
- Epiphyllum pumilum Britton & Rose

Synonyms
- Phyllocactus pumilus (Britton & Rose) Vaupel; Epiphyllum caudatum Britton & Rose; Phyllocactus caudatus (Britton & Rose) Vaupel

= Epiphyllum pumilum =

Species of cactus

Epiphyllum pumilum is a cactus species native to Mexico and Guatemala. The species is commonly grown as an ornamental for its beautiful, fragrant flowers in the summer.

== Etymology ==
This specific epithet refers to the relatively small flowers of this species. History F. Eichlam found this cacti in Guatemala and sent a living specimen to the U. S. which flowered in Washington on October 3, 1912. It had previously been collected at several occasions but passed as E. pittieri. Unaware of its variable nature, Britton and Rose described the same species again in the same paper, under the name E. caudatum. This time from a specimen collected in Oaxaca, Mexico collected by E. W. Nelson in 1894. Later the same year, Vaupel transferred the two taxa to Phyllocactus, an invalid name used in Europe by that time.

== Origin and habitat ==
Mexico (Vera Cruz, Tabasco, Oaxaca, Chiapas) to the lowlands of Guatemala.

== Systematics ==
This species is closely related to Epiphyllum oxypetalum and differs mainly in its smaller flowers.

== Cultivation ==
Easily cultivated and fast growing. Needs a compost containing plenty of humus and plenty of moisture in summer. Will not tolerate low winter temperatures, around 12 °C (53,5 °F) will be more suitable. Best grown in semi-shade. Usually flowers in summer or in the early autumn.

== Description ==
Stems erect, later ascending becoming pendent, to 5 m long or more, woody at base, profusely branched, primary stems, terete for 80–150 cm, secondary stems and apical parts of primary stems flat (rarely 3-angled), elongated-lanceolate, terete at base, 10–60 cm long, 3–8,5 cm wide, acute to long acuminate, rather thick when mature, margins remotely toothed to indented, shallowly undulate or shallowly crenate; epidermis green. Flowers 10–15 cm long, nocturnal and fragrant; pericarpel ca 12 mm long, 8 mm thick, green, bracteoles 1 mm long, orbicular, reddish, nude or with 1 bristle, less than 1 mm long; receptacle 5–7 cm long, 5 mm thick, greenish white to reddish, bracteoles few, very small, ascending and appressed, without spines or hairs, red: outer petals linear, 4–9 cm long, ca 5 mm wide, greenish or reddish, acute; inner petals white, linear-lanceolate to lanceolate, acuminate, 3–6 cm long, white; stamens inserted in 2 zones, white, anthers creamy white; style slender, 4–9 cm long, white. Fruit ovoid, 2,5 cm thick, brilliant cerice, 5-7 angled, bracteoles few, ascending, pulp white, sweet, seeds minute, black.
