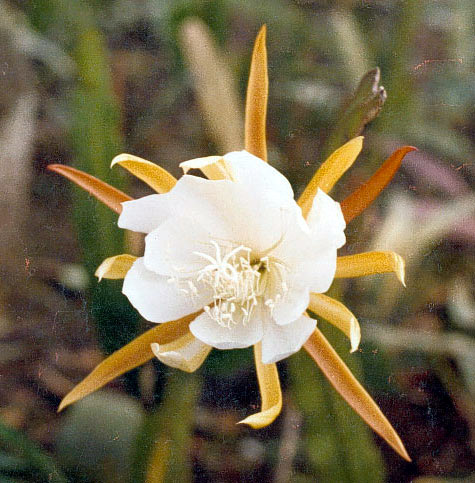
- Photo: Alfred Lau

Scientific classification
- Kingdom: Plantae
- Clade: Tracheophytes
- Clade: Angiosperms
- Clade: Eudicots
- Order: Caryophyllales
- Family: Cactaceae
- Subfamily: Cactoideae
- Genus: Epiphyllum
- Species: E. laui

Binomial name
- Epiphyllum laui Kimnach

= Epiphyllum laui =

Species of cactus

Epiphyllum laui is a cactus species native to Mexico and grown as an ornamental.

== Description ==
Stems branching basally or laterally; base narrow to subterete for 1–2 cm, flattened portions linear, subobtuse, 5–7 cm wide, midrib prominent, crenate, often slightly undulate; areoles hidden by brownish cream leaves, 2 mm wide and 1 mm long, brownish cream; spines 1-3 (-5), 3–5 mm long, hairlike, brownish yellow; epidermis shiny green, smooth, apices often reddish or brownish.

Flowers 15–16 cm long, 14–16 cm wide, opening in the evening and remain fully expanded for two days, funnelform; pericarpel inconspicuous, ca 2 cm long; olive green, tinged pinkish; bracteoles that subtend spare areolar wool and 1-3 thin yellowish spines; the remainder of pericarpel 9 cm long, yellowish olive, tinged pinkish or orange-yellow by light; bracteoles 1–2, without areolar wool; outer tepals recurving to nearly rotate or ascending, attached within 1,5 cm of receptacle, linear-oblanceolate, rather abruptly acute, 7–9 cm long, 5–10 mm wide, outermost reddish orange or reddish yellow, innermost pure yellow; inner tepals 11, forming a campanulate cluster, obovate-oblong, abruptly aristate, 6–7 cm long, 20–22 mm wide, outermost white tinged yellow, innermost pure white; stamens 4 cm long, forming a throat-circle at receptacle apex, cream; anthers light yellow; style 12,5 cm long, lobes 8, expanding and recurving, cream.

Fruit oblong, (4–5) 6 (-8) cm long, 2-3 (3–4) cm thick at middle, carmine red, flesh white, pink when fully ripe. Seeds ovoid-reniform, 2 mm long, 1 mm thick, black.

== Taxonomy ==
E. laui is most closely allied to Epiphyllum crenatum and Epiphyllum anguliger.

=== Taxonomic history ===
Even though this plant was discovered in 1975, it was not described until 1990 as it failed to flower at the Huntington Botanical Garden. However, it flowered profusely for Alfred Lau in Mexico, as in several European collections, so Myron Kimnach knew that the plant represented a new species. In 1989, it finally flowered at Huntington and Kimnach was able to write a scientific description. Kimnach described the plant as "outstandingly attractive".

=== Etymology ===
This species is named after Alfred B. Lau who discovered this species in 1975.

== Origin and habitat ==
E. laui is found in Mexico (Chiapas). It grows as a lithophyte and an epiphyte at altitudes of 1,800 to 2,000 meters.

== Cultivation ==
E. laui is a fast-growing plant but is known to suffer from die-back of stem tissue. Myron Kimnach had to wait 10 years for the first flowers. However, it has been easily cultivated in Europe. In cultivation E. laui seems to prefer high humidity and soil moisture, as well as rather cool conditions. Plants have survived temperatures near freezing in Germany. As the die-back can be caused by a viral infection, it is recommended not to propagate cuttings from plants known to exhibit viral damage.
