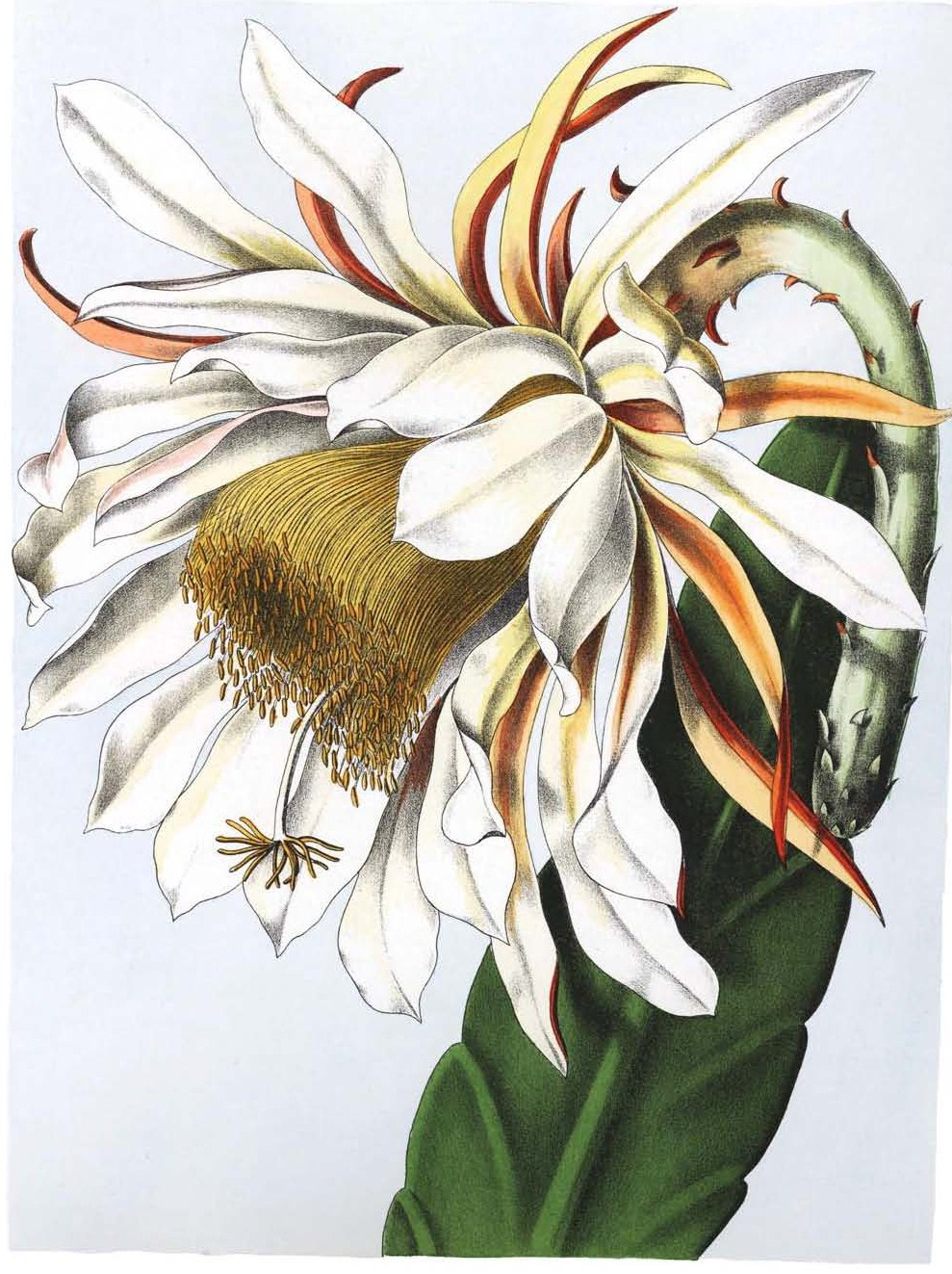

Scientific classification
- Kingdom: Plantae
- Clade: Tracheophytes
- Clade: Angiosperms
- Clade: Eudicots
- Order: Caryophyllales
- Family: Cactaceae
- Subfamily: Cactoideae
- Genus: Epiphyllum
- Species: E. thomasianum

Binomial name
- Epiphyllum thomasianum (K.Schum.) Britton & Rose

Synonyms
- Phyllocactus thomasianus K.Schum.; Epiphyllum costaricense (F.A.C.Weber) Britton & Rose; Epiphyllum macrocarpum (F.A.C.Weber) Backeb.; Epiphyllum thomasianum var. costaricense (F.A.C.Weber) Kimnach; Phyllocactus costaricensis F.A.C.Weber; Phyllocactus macrocarpus F.A.C.Weber

= Epiphyllum thomasianum =

Species of cactus

Epiphyllum thomasianum is an epiphytic species of cactus native to Colombia, Costa Rica, Guatemala, Honduras, Mexico, Nicaragua, and Panamá.

== Description ==
The vegetative morphology closely resembles Epiphyllum oxypetalum. The flowers differ due to their striking golden stamens.

=== Systematics ===
Currently two subspecies are recognised: Epiphyllum thomasianum subsp. costaricense and Epiphyllum thomasianum subsp. thomasianum.
