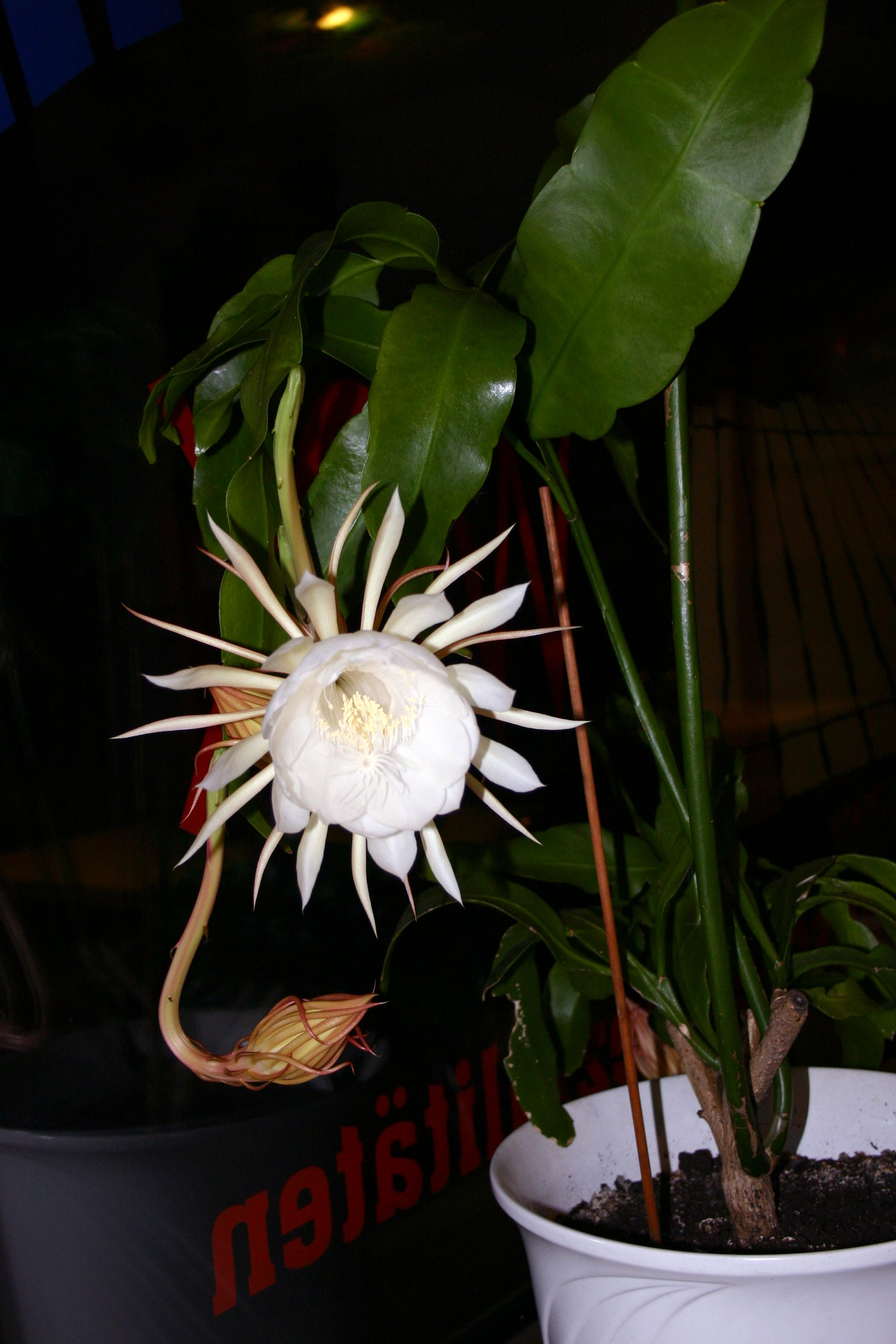
- Epiphyllum oxypetalum

Scientific classification
- Kingdom: Plantae
- Clade: Embryophytes
- Clade: Tracheophytes
- Clade: Angiosperms
- Clade: Eudicots
- Order: Caryophyllales
- Family: Cactaceae
- Subfamily: Cactoideae
- Tribe: Hylocereeae
- Genus: Epiphyllum; Haw.

Type species
- Epiphyllum phyllanthus (L.) Haw.

Species
- See text.

Synonyms
- Phyllocereus Miq.; Marniera Backeb.; Phyllocactus Link

= Epiphyllum =

Genus of cacti

Epiphyllum, /ˌɛpɪˈfɪləm/; from Ancient Greek ἐπι- (epi-), meaning "upon", and φύλλον (phúllon), meaning "leaf", is a genus of epiphytic plants in the cactus family (Cactaceae), native to Central America and South America. Common names for these species include climbing cacti, orchid cacti and leaf cacti, though the latter also refers to the genus Pereskia.

== Description ==
The stems are broad and flat, 1–5 cm broad, 3–5 mm thick, usually with lobed edges. The flowers themselves are large, with diameters ranging from 8 to 16 cm, white through red, with numerous petals. These flowers have notably short, nocturnal antheses, blooming only at night, and wilting at dawn. The fruit is edible, very similar to the pitaya fruit from the closely related genus Hylocereus, though not so large, being only 3–4 cm long.

The broad-leaved epiphyllum (Epiphyllum oxypetalum) is particularly well known species that bears large, strongly fragrant flowers.

== Taxonomy ==
It was published by Adrian Hardy Haworth in 1812. The type species is Epiphyllum phyllanthus (L.) Haw.

=== Species ===
As of May 2020, Plants of the World Online accepts 10 species:

Image	Scientific name	Distribution
	Epiphyllum baueri Dorsch	Colombia, Panama
	Epiphyllum cartagense (F.A.C.Weber) Britton & Rose	Costa Rica, Panama
	Epiphyllum chrysocardium Alexander	Mexico
	Epiphyllum grandilobum (F.A.C.Weber) Britton & Rose	Costa Rica, Nicaragua, Panama
	Epiphyllum hookeri Haw.	Mexico, Central America, Venezuela; introduced to Florida
	Epiphyllum laui Kimnach	Mexico
	Epiphyllum oxypetalum (DC.) Haw.	Belize, Honduras, El Salvador, Mexico
	Epiphyllum phyllanthus (L.) Haw.	Mexico to Venezuela then south to Argentina
	Epiphyllum pumilum Britton & Rose	Guatemala, Mexico
	Epiphyllum thomasianum (K.Schum.) Britton & Rose	Costa Rica, Ecuador, Guatemala, Nicaragua

=== Formerly placed here ===
- Disocactus crenatus (Lindl.) M.Á.Cruz & S.Arias (as Epiphyllum crenatum (Lindl.) G.Don)
- Disocactus lepidocarpus (F.A.C.Weber) M.Á.Cruz & S.Arias (as Epiphyllum lepidocarpum (F.A.C.Weber) Britton & Rose)
- Disocactus phyllanthoides (DC.) Barthlott (as E. phyllanthoides (DC.) Sweet)

== Cultivation ==
The plants known as epiphyllum hybrids, epiphyllums or just epis, which are widely grown for their flowers, are artificial hybrids of species within the tribe Hylocereeae, particularly species of Disocactus. In spite of the common name, the involvement of Epiphyllum species as parents of Epiphyllum hybrids is unconfirmed.
