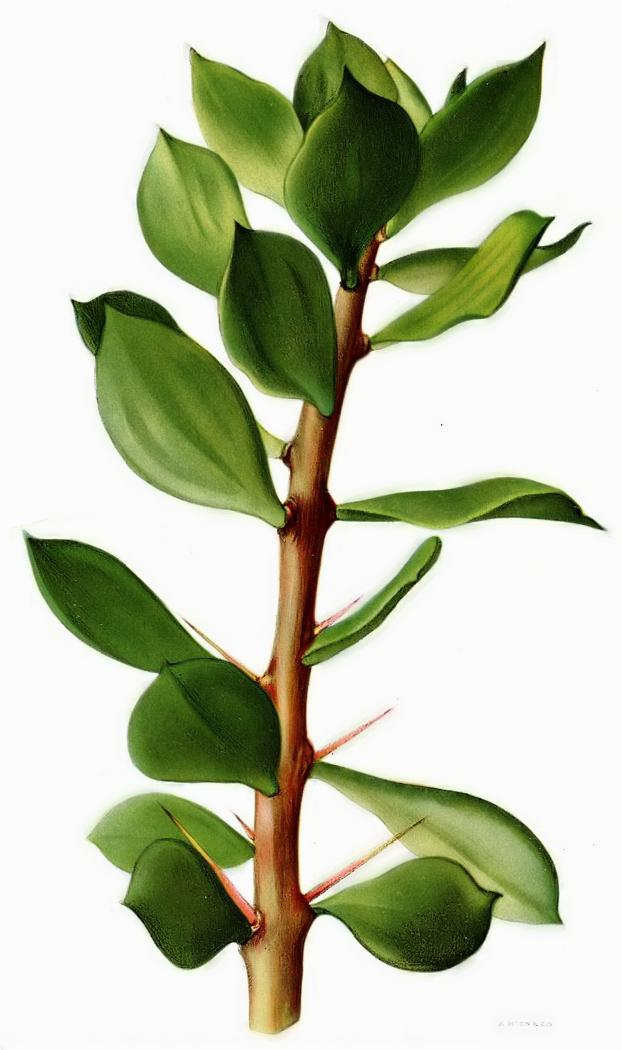
- Pereskiopsis rotundifolia
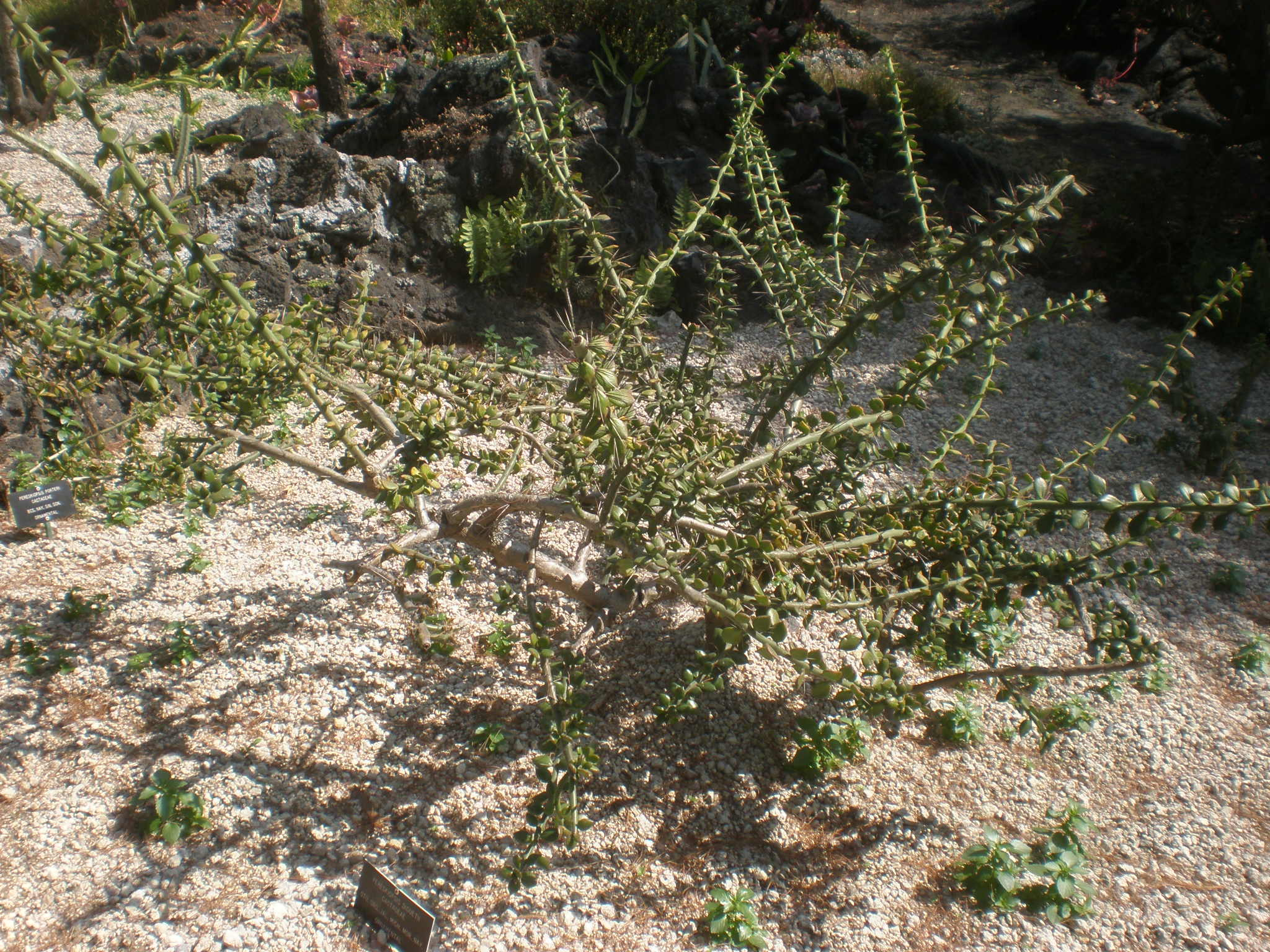
- Pereskiopsis diguetii in the Jardín Botánico de la UNAM, México

Scientific classification
- Kingdom: Plantae
- Clade: Tracheophytes
- Clade: Angiosperms
- Clade: Eudicots
- Order: Caryophyllales
- Family: Cactaceae
- Subfamily: Opuntioideae
- Tribe: Cylindropuntieae
- Genus: Pereskiopsis; Britton & Rose

Species
- See text.

= Pereskiopsis =

Genus of cacti

Pereskiopsis is a genus of cactus (family Cactaceae) in the subfamily Opuntioideae. Unlike typical cacti, it has persistent fleshy leaves. The genus name refers to its resemblance to the genus Pereskia. Most species are found in Mexico south through Guatemala to Honduras, with one species in Bolivia. The incorrect spelling Peireskiopsis has also been used.

== Description ==
Species of Pereskiopsis do not have the typical appearance of most cacti, including those in the subfamily Opuntioideae to which it belongs, since they have persistent fleshy leaves. They mostly have a shrubby or treelike growth habit, although some scramble or climb. Their stems have a round cross section and are not divided into segments. Their leaves are flat, succulent and generally long-lasting, and of various shapes, including elliptical and almost round. The characteristic areoles of cacti are present, and usually have glochids marking them as members of the Opuntioideae as well as needle-like spines. Their flowers resemble those of the genus Opuntia, with petals that open widely during the day. The fruits, which have few seeds, are fleshy and often have glochids.

== Taxonomy ==
The genus was described by Nathaniel Lord Britton and Joseph Nelson Rose in 1907. Species known at that time had been variously placed in either Opuntia or Pereskia. Two were first described in Pereskia in 1828, and transferred to Opuntia in 1898 under the section Pereskiopuntia. The genus name means like Pereskia, being derived from the genus name Pereskia plus the Greek-derived ending -opsis meaning 'appearance'. Pereskia is named after Nicolas-Claude Fabri de Peiresc, a 16th-century French botanist. Some sources have used the incorrect spelling Peireskiopsis.

=== Phylogeny ===
Pereskiopsis is placed in the tribe Cylindropuntieae of the subfamily Opuntioideae. A 2016 molecular phylogenetic study of the tribe suggested the relationships shown in the following cladogram, where the genera Quiabentia and Pereskiopsis are basal to the main clade of Grusonia and Cylindropuntia. However, only two species of Pereskiopsis were included, and the status of Micropuntia pulchella remains uncertain. The author of the study suggested it be recognized as Micropuntia pulchella, although it could be another species of Pereskiopsis. However, M. pulchella has deciduous leaves, unlike the persistent leaves characteristic of Pereskiopsis.

- Cylindropuntieae
  - Quiabentia
  - - - Pereskiopsis
      - Grusonia pulchella, syn. of Micropuntia pulchella
    - - Grusonia (12 species)
      - Cylindropuntia

== Species ==
As of January 2023, Plants of the World Online accepted seven species:

Image	Scientific name	Distribution
	Pereskiopsis aquosa (F.A.C.Weber) Britton & Rose	Mexico
	Pereskiopsis blakeana J.G.Ortega	Mexico (Sinaloa, Durango, Michoacán)
	Pereskiopsis brandegeei Britton & Rose	Mexico (Baja California Sur)
	Pereskiopsis diguetii (F.A.C.Weber) Britton & Rose	Mexico, Bolivia
	Pereskiopsis kellermanii Rose	Guatemala, Honduras, Mexico
	Pereskiopsis porteri (Brandegee ex F.A.C.Weber) Britton & Rose	Mexico (Sinaloa to Durango and Nayarit)
	Pereskiopsis rotundifolia (DC.) Britton & Rose	Mexico

== Distribution ==
Species of Pereskia are native from Mexico south through Guatemala to Honduras, with one species, Pereskiopsis diguetii, also being found in Bolivia.

== Cultivation ==
Pereskiopsis species are not often cultivated as ornamental plants. Seedlings are used as grafting stock because of their narrow stem and vigorous growth, and are commonly used as rootstock to graft seedlings of columnar cacti such as Echinopsis pachanoi and Echinopsis lageniformis in order to accelerate their growth.
