= Cactus elegans =

Cactus elegans may refer to:

- Cactus elegans Link, a synonym for Disocactus phyllanthoides, a species (Cactoideae, Hylocereeae) native to Mesoamerica
- Cactus elegans (DC.) Kuntze, a synonym for Mammillaria elegans, a species (Cactoideae, Cacteae) native to Mexico
