= Orchid cactus =

Orchid cactus may refer to:

- Epiphyllum hybrid, one of a number of hybrid cacti derived primarily from species of the genus Disocactus, often collectively called "epiphyllums" or "epis", for example:
  - Disocactus ×hybridus
- Epiphyllum, one or more of the species of this genus
