= Epiphyllum hybrid =

Hybrid cactus

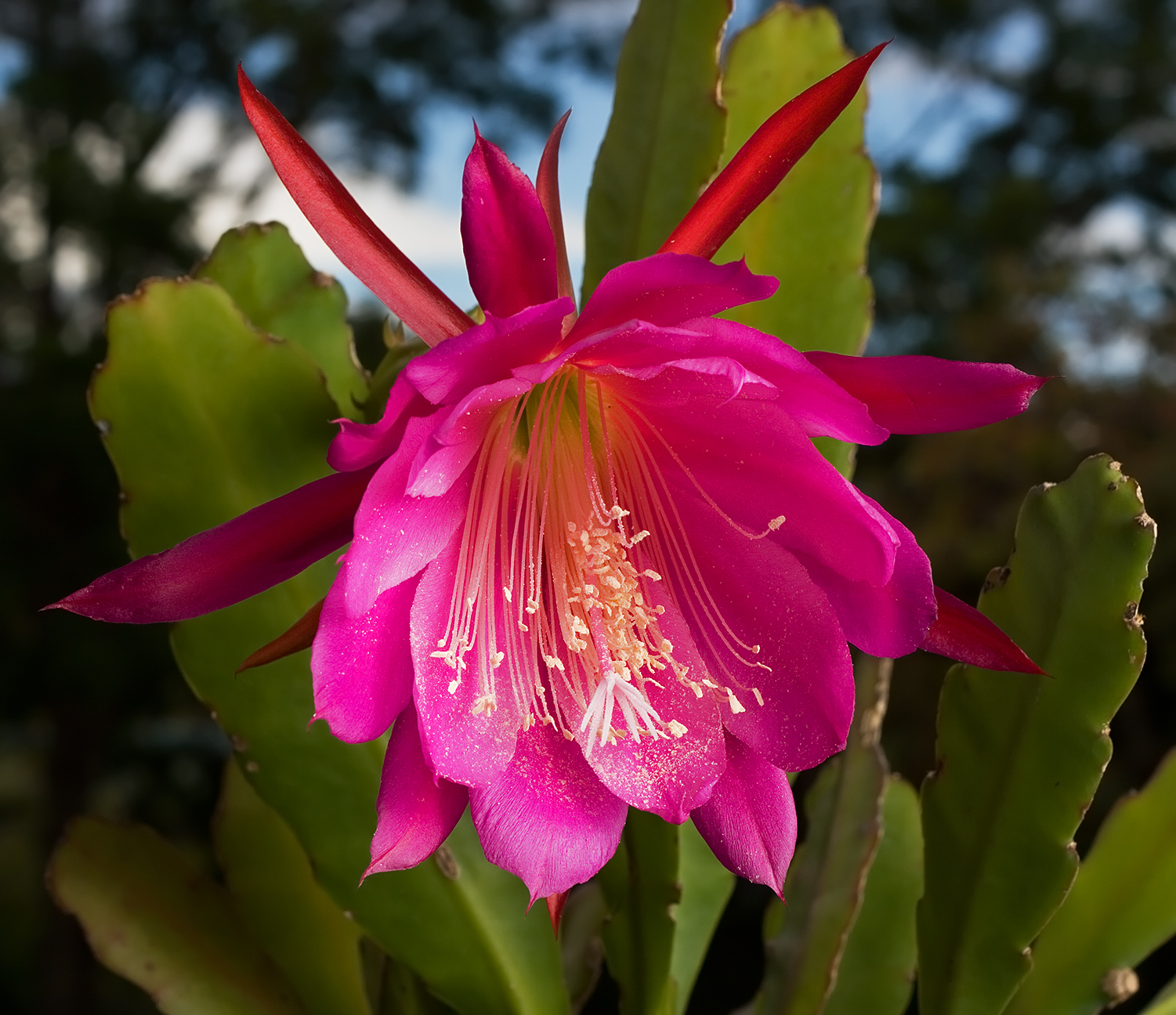
'Wendy'

Epiphyllum hybrids, epiphyllums, epicacti, or just epis, also known as orchid cacti, which are widely grown for their flowers, are artificial hybrids derived primarily from species of the genus Disocactus. These Disocactus species are not true epiphyllums, but they used to be included in the genus Epiphyllum.

== Parental species ==
Epiphyllum hybrids are mostly derived from one or more of the following species:

- Disocactus crenatus (Lindl.) M.Á.Cruz & S.Arias (= Epiphyllum crenatum (Lindl.) G.Don)
- Disocactus phyllanthoides (DC.) Barthlott (= Epiphyllum phyllanthoides (DC.) Sweet)
- Disocactus speciosus (Cav.) Barthlott (= Epiphyllum speciosum (Cav.) Haw.)
- Disocactus macranthus (Alexander) Kimnach & Hutchison (= Pseudorhipsalis macrantha Alexander)
- Disocactus ackermannii (Haw.) Ralf Bauer (= Epiphyllum ackermannii Haw.)
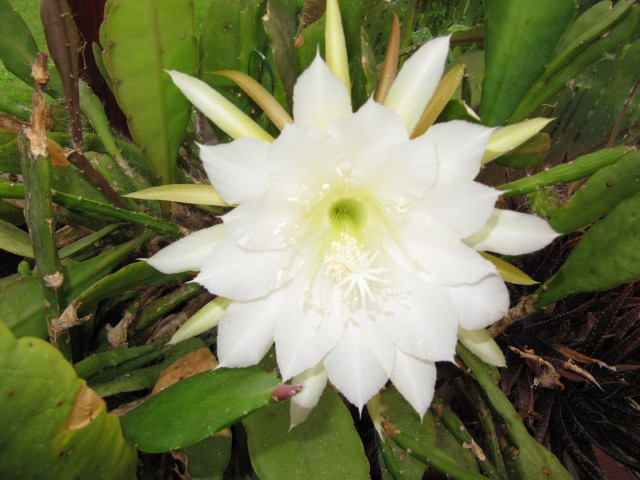
D. crenatus

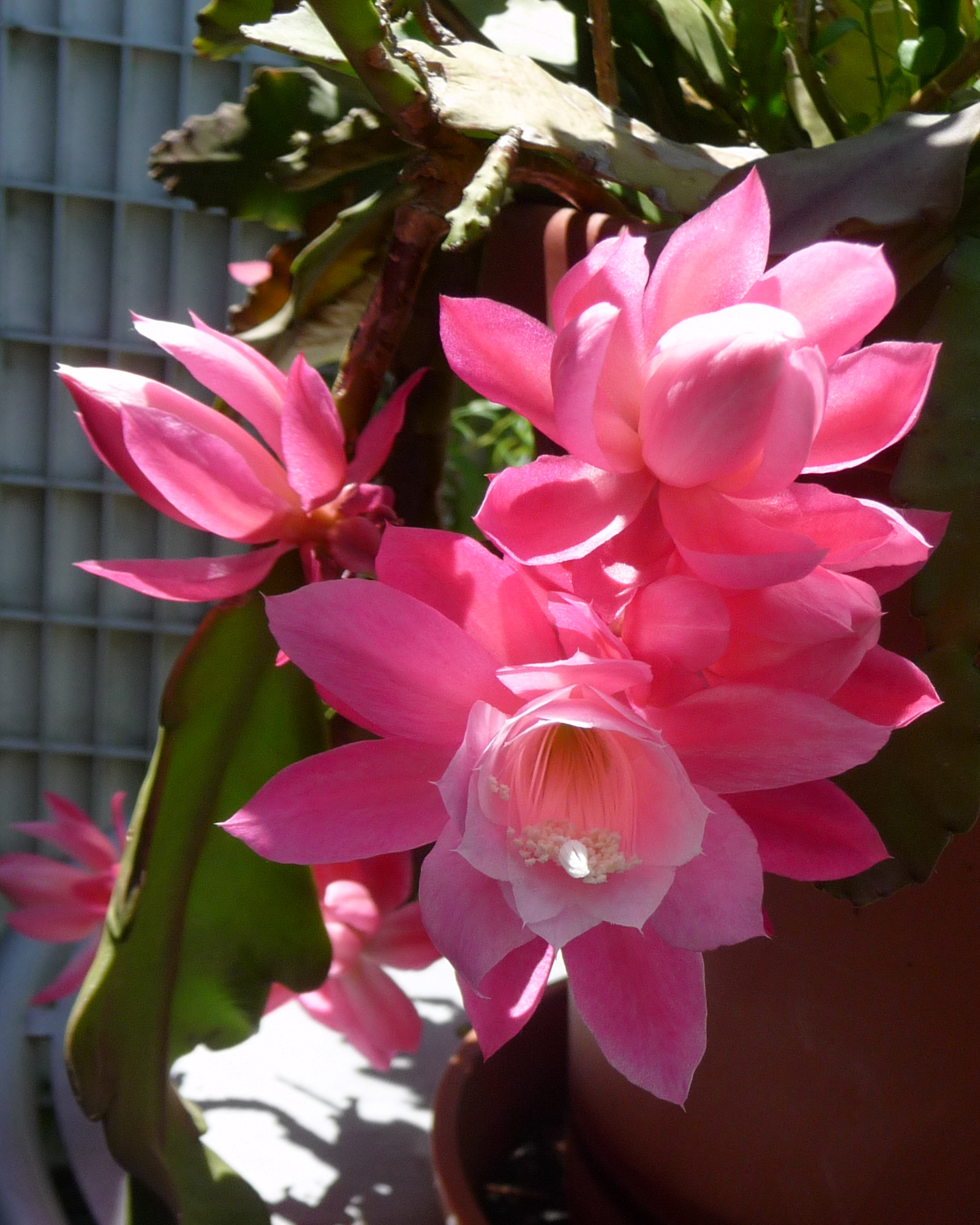
D. phyllanthoides

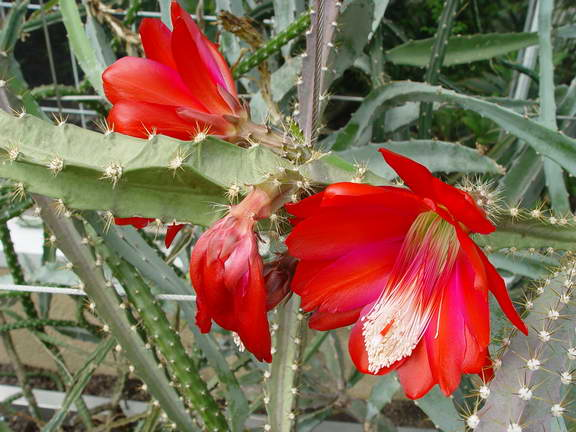
D. speciosus

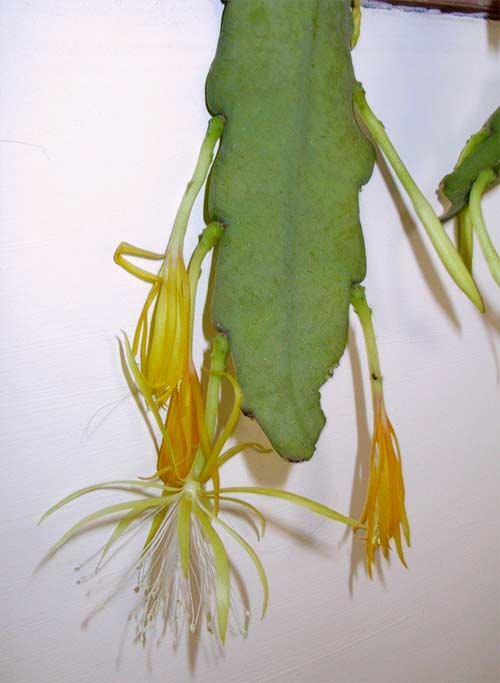
D. macranthus

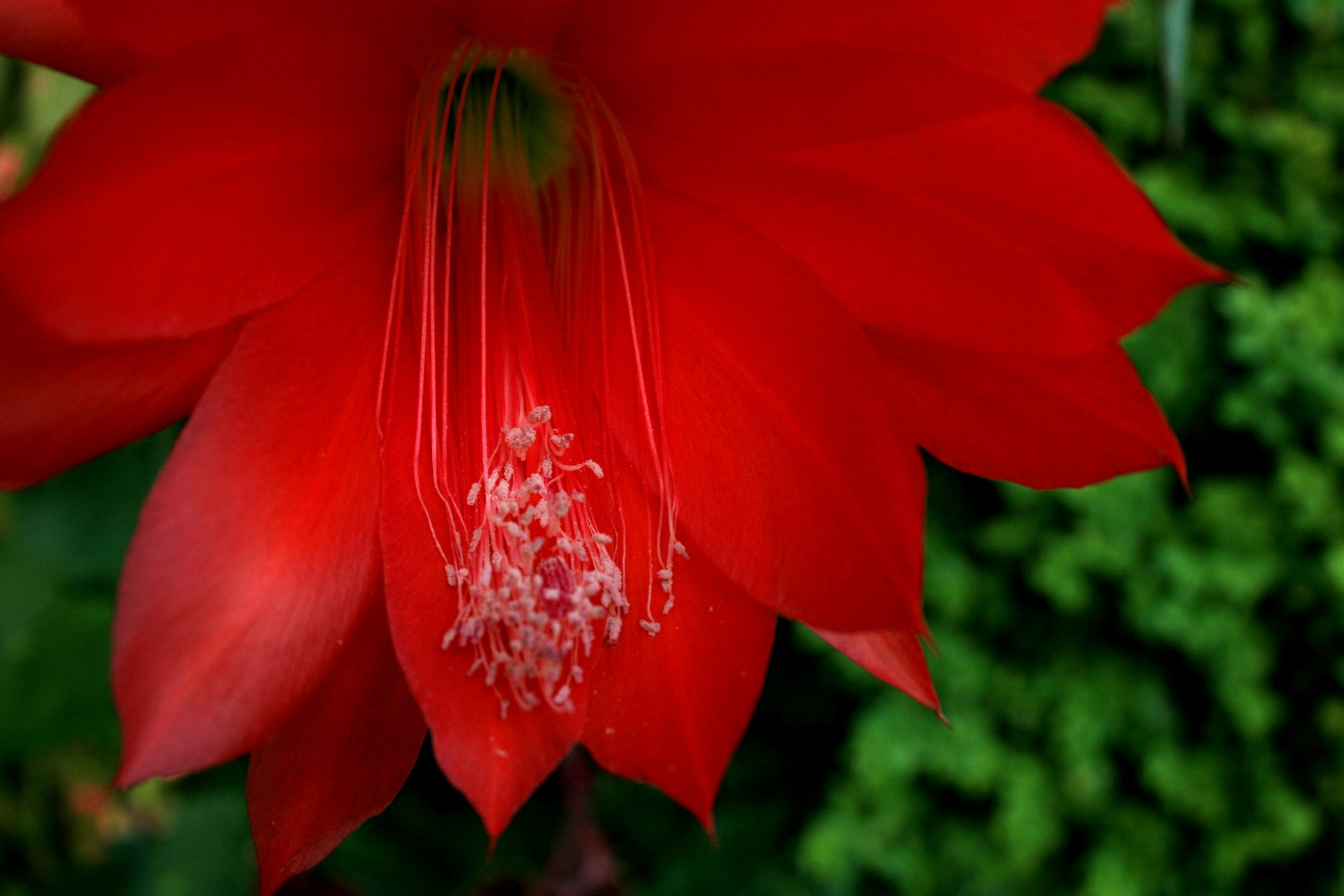
D. ackermannii

Some cacti in the tribe Hylocereeae other than Disocactus have been crossed with species or hybrids of Disocactus, but not all the derived hybrids are considered epiphyllum hybrids. For example, × Disoselenicereus fulgidus (Disocactus speciosus × Selenicereus pteranthus) and × Aporodisocactus mallisonii (Aporocactus flagelliformis × Disocactus speciosus) are too morphologically dissimilar to Epiphyllum to be called "epiphyllum hybrids".

The following are some species reported to be used in intergeneric crosses to breed epiphyllum hybrids:

- Epiphyllum chrysocardium Alexander (reported to be one of the parents of 'Hunsrück Début')
- Epiphyllum hookeri Haw. (reported to be crossed with Disocactus crenatus and then with 'Crème de menthe' to breed 'Aaba')
- Pfeiffera monacantha (Griseb.) P.V.Heath (reported to be one of the parents of 'Naranja')
- Pfeiffera paranganiensis (Cárdenas) P.V.Heath (reported to be one of the parents of 'Inca's Golden Dream')

The following reports on intergeneric epiphyllum hybrids are either dubious or false:

- × Epinicereus cooperi is alleged to be a hybrid between Disocactus crenatus and Selenicereus grandiflorus, but it turns out that this plant is not of hybrid origin, and it should be correctly referred to as Disocactus crenatus subsp. kimnachii 'Cooperi'.
- × Disoselenicereus wrayae is also considered to be a hybrid between Disocactus crenatus and Selenicereus grandiflorus, but Myron William Kimnach supposes it is just a variant of Disocactus crenatus subsp. crenatus as he tried to reproduce the cross but failed.
- A plant called Epiphyllum splendidus was crossed with Disocactus crenatus by Hovey & Co. of Boston in about 1870, but the so-called "Epiphyllum" is actually a reddish-flowered form of Disocactus.
- Edward Frederick Anderson thinks Pseudorhipsalis spp. are in the parentage of epiphyllum hybrids. However, the only "Pseudorhipsalis sp." known as a breeding parent of epiphyllum hybrids is Disocactus macranthus (= Pseudorhipsalis macrantha).

== Named nothospecies ==
- Disocactus × amaranthinus (Regel) M.H.J.van der Meer (= × Disophyllum amaranthinum (Regel) E.Meier)
  - D. crenatus × D. phyllanthoides
- Disocactus × capelleanus (Rother) E.Meier
  - D. ackermannii × D. phyllanthoides
- Disocactus × charltonii (Mast.) M.H.J.van der Meer (= × Disophyllum charltonii (Mast.) E.Meier)
  - D. crenatus × D. speciosus
- Disocactus × coopermannii (Worsley) M.H.J.van der Meer
  - D. crenatus × D. phyllanthoides × D. speciosus
- Disocactus × hansii (Baumann) M.H.J.van der Meer (= Disocactus × violaceus (F.Sm. & T.Sm.bis ex Mast.) Barthlott)
  - D. ackermannii × D. speciosus
- Disocactus × jenkinsonii (McIntosh) M.H.J.van der Meer (= Disocactus × hybridus (Van Geel) Barthlott)
  - D. phyllanthoides × D. speciosus
- Disocactus × kimnachii G.D.Rowley (= Nopalxochia × horichii Kimnach)
  - D. phyllanthoides × ?
- Disocactus × splendens (Regel) M.H.J.van der Meer (= × Disophyllum splendens (Regel) E.Meier)
  - D. crenatus × D. ackermannii
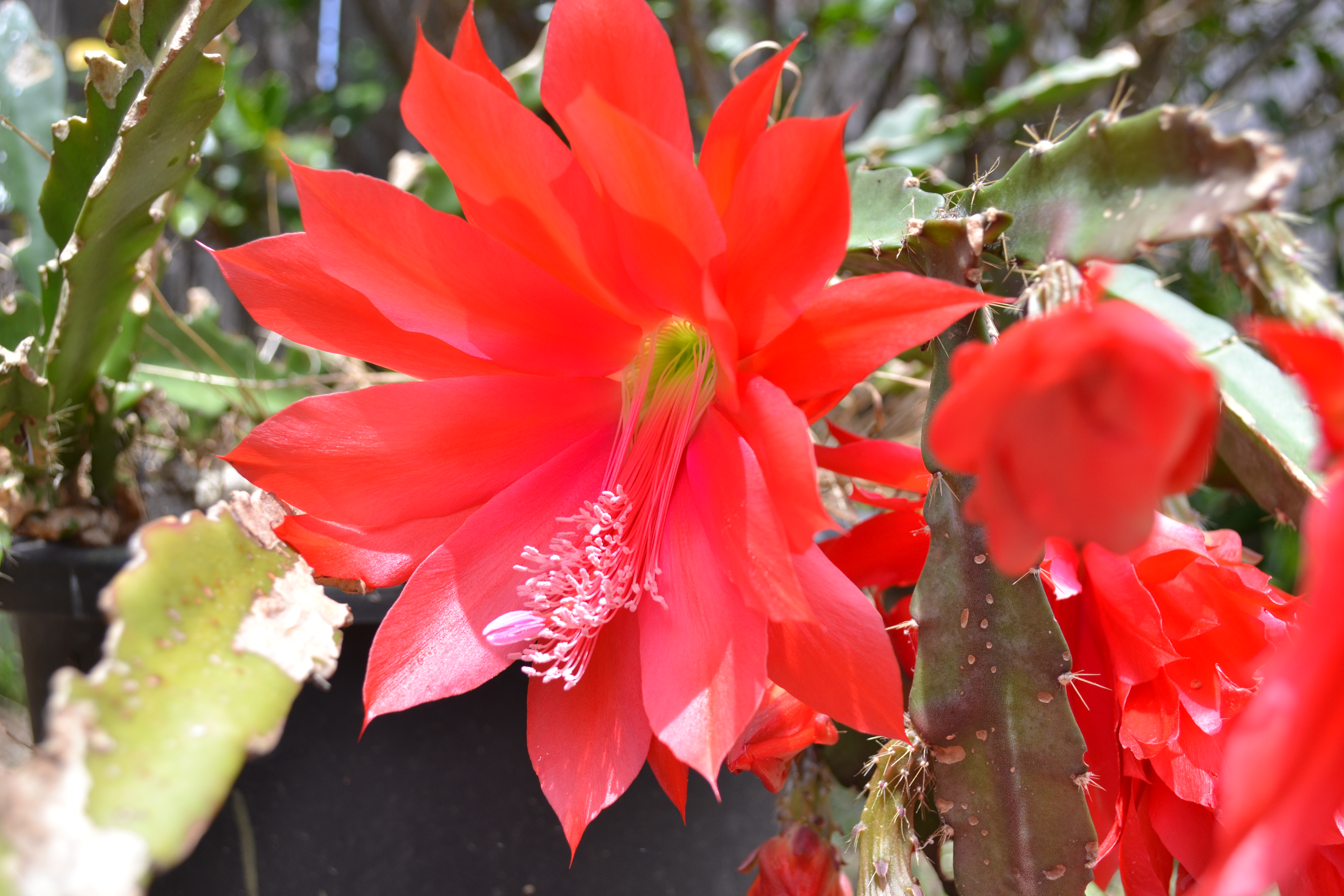
D. × hansii

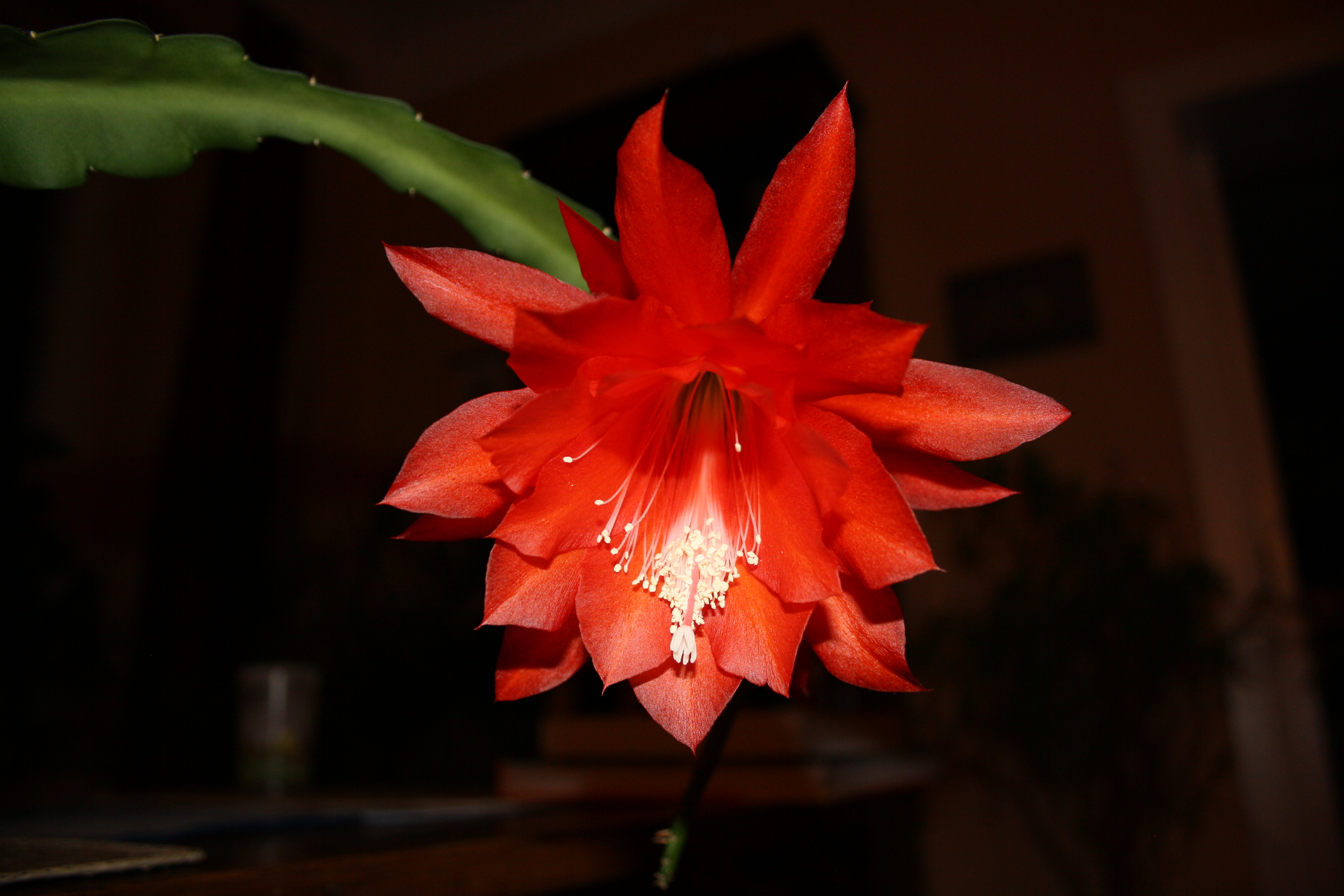
D. × jenkinsonii

== History ==
The parent species from which epiphyllum hybrids were bred are different in appearance and habit from most cacti. They are found in the tropical forests of Central America where they grow as climbers or on trees as epiphytes. They have leafless (or apparently leafless) flattened stems which act as the plant's photosynthetic organs. Relatively large flowers are borne on the sides of the stems; in many species they open at night. Thousands of cultivated hybrids have been created, often with the intention of increasing the size and colour range of their flowers, which average 13–20 cm (5–8 in) across, although the largest can reach 38 cm (15 in).

The Epiphyllum Society of America (the International Registration Authority for hybrids of the Tribe Hylocereeae) maintains a list of epiphyllum hybrids (and Hylocereeae species) which contained over 7,000 names in 1996.

== Cultivation ==
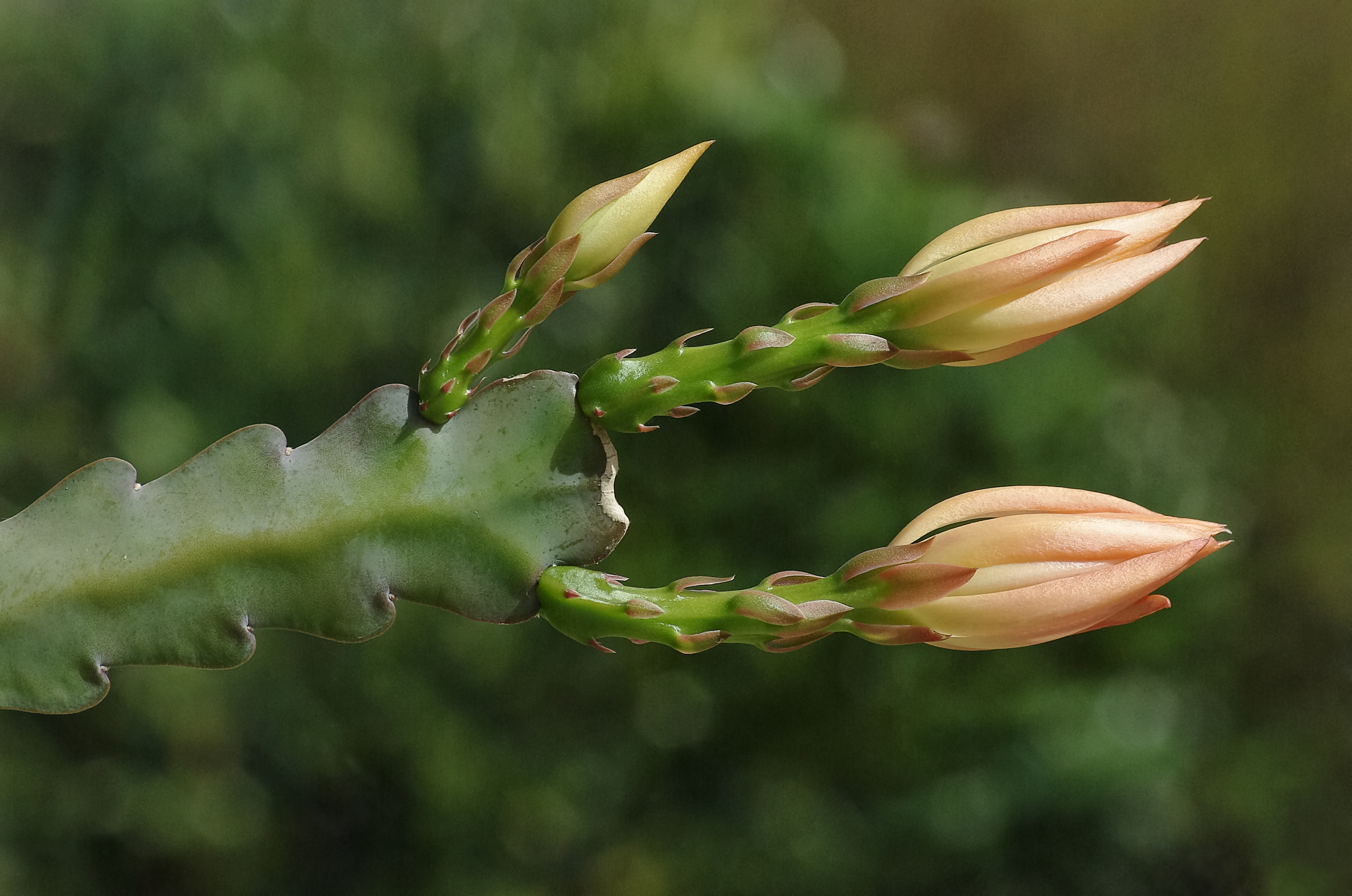
Floral buds of an epiphyllum hybrid

Epiphyllum hybrids need different treatment from semi-desert cacti. They should be protected from direct sunlight, with preferably 75% shading at midday. They are not frost hardy, so need to be protected from freezing conditions. It is recommended that the growing medium allows rapid drainage of water and is open, with at least one third of coarse material to prevent compaction. Plants should be kept moist. High nitrogen fertilizers are not recommended; no fertilizer should be given during the winter rest period.

Epiphyllum hybrids can be propagated from cuttings. Rooting hormone can be applied to the base of the cutting before it is allowed to dry for ten days or more so that the cut forms a callus. The cutting is then planted sufficiently deeply so that it can stand upright. Water is not given for two weeks, after which the growing medium is kept at least slightly moist. Plants can be misted. They are fast growing plants and should flower within two years. Epiphyllum hybrids should be re-potted every 2 to 3 years as they tend to sour and deplete the nutrients in their growing medium. Because the plants are aggressive and grow quickly, they are susceptible to depleting the potassium in their growing medium which results in older growth failing to remain turgid and shriveling. They should be provided a balanced fertilizer when in active growth to prevent the older growth from shriveling. Flowering is triggered by withholding water and giving the plants a dry resting period of about two months during their winter rest.

Flower variation in epiphyllum hybrids

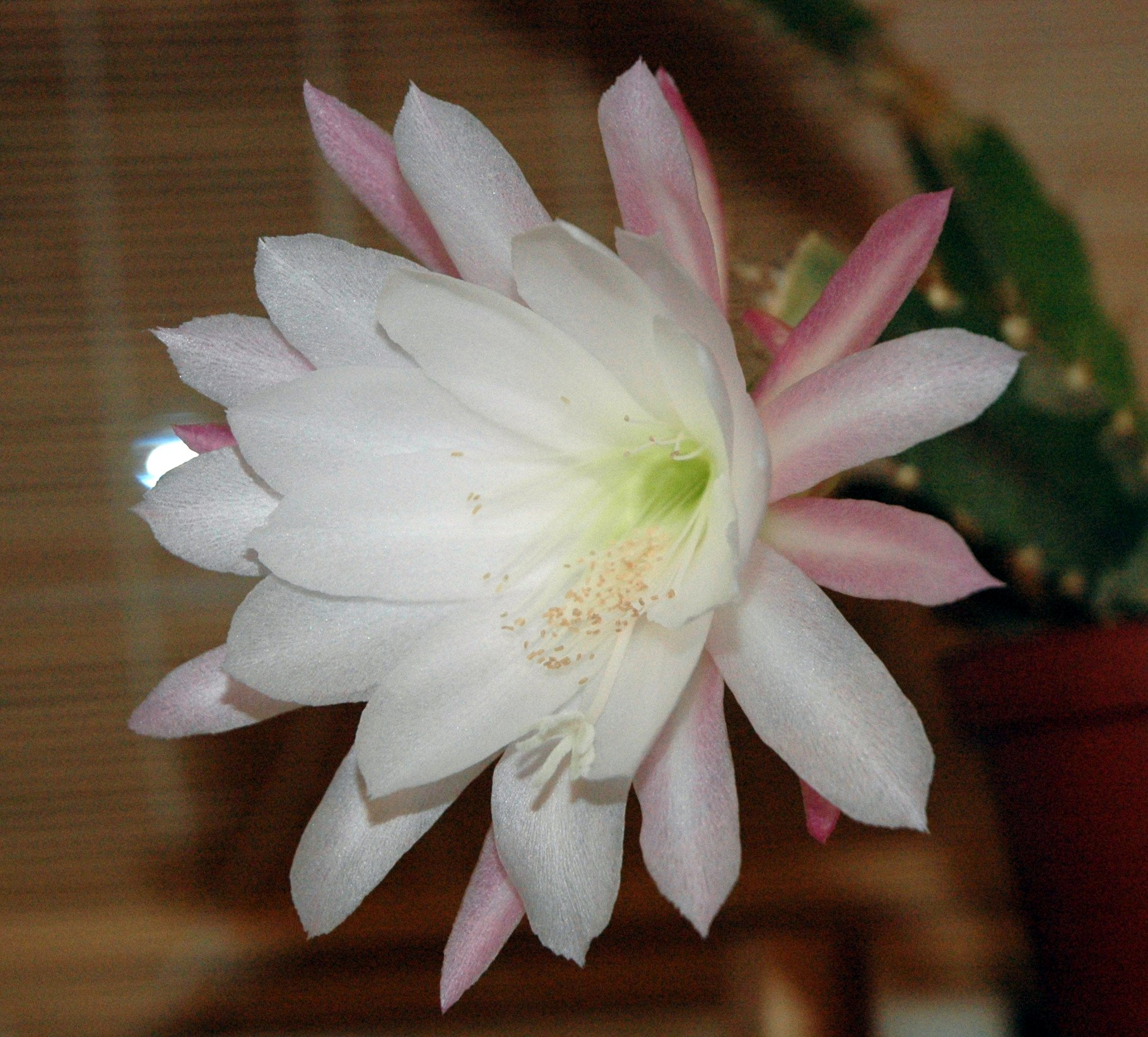
'Helmut Oetken'

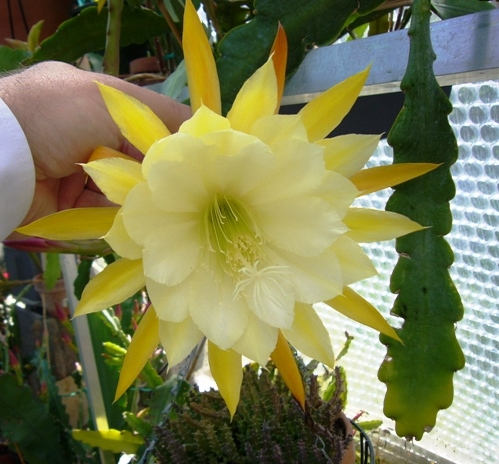
'George French'

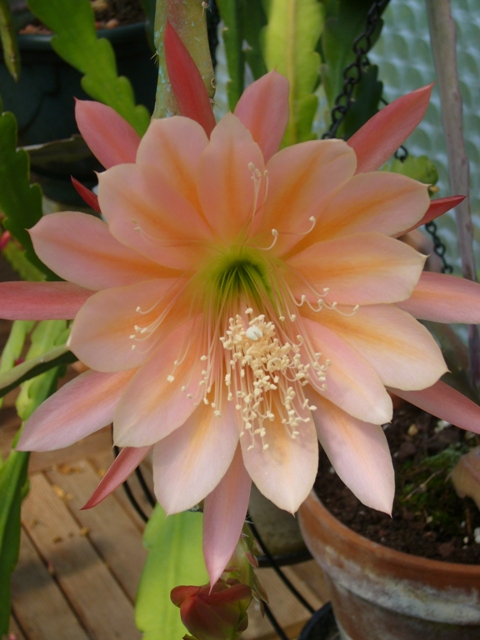
'King Midas'

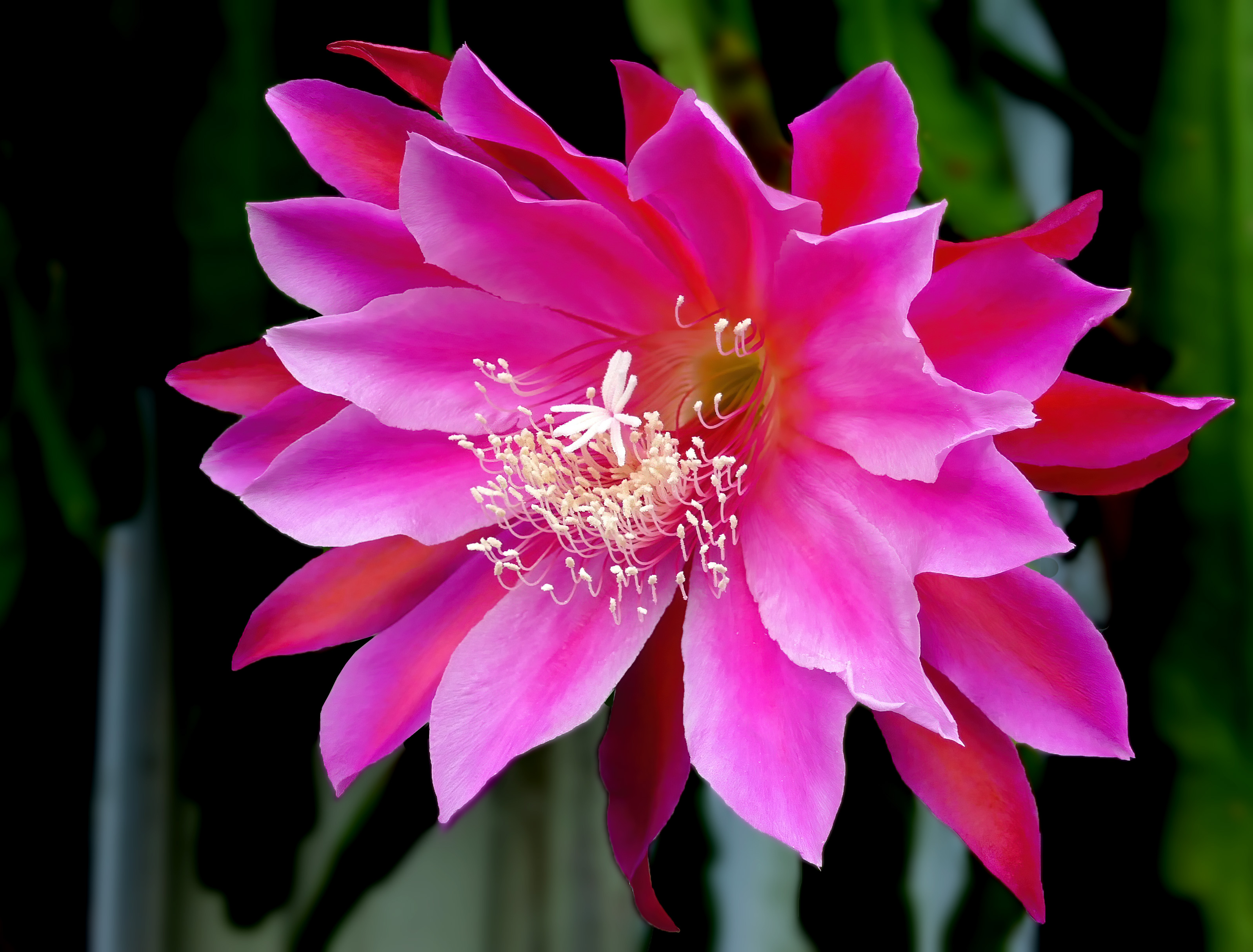
'Unforgettable'
