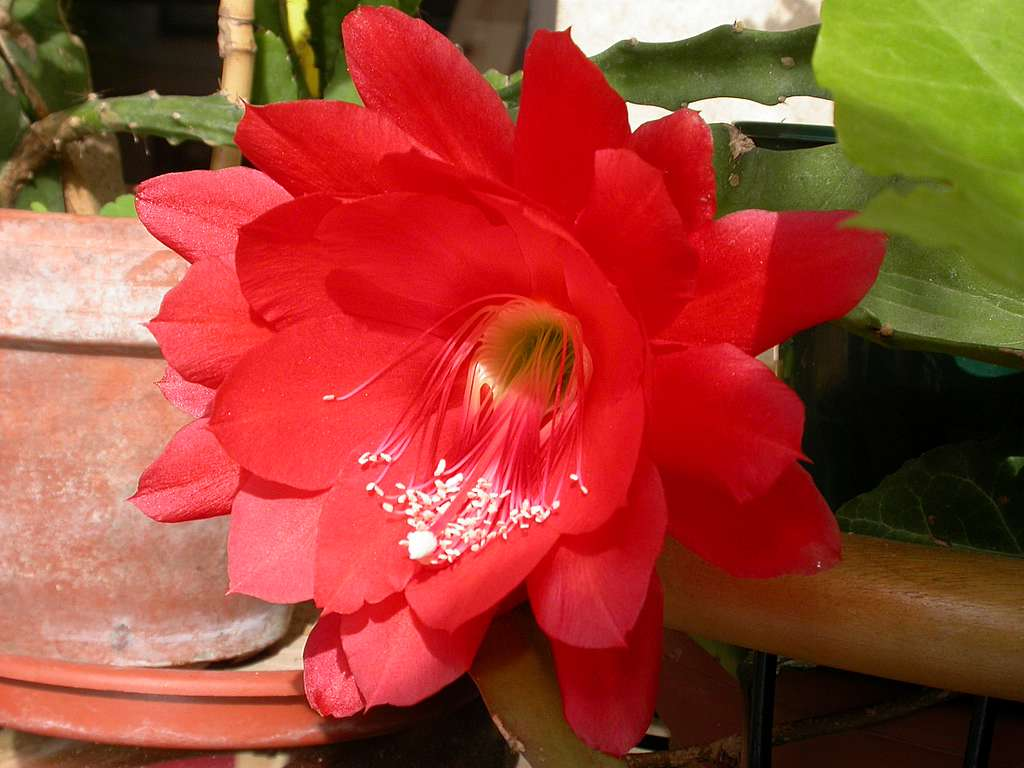

Scientific classification
- Kingdom: Plantae
- Clade: Embryophytes
- Clade: Tracheophytes
- Clade: Spermatophytes
- Clade: Angiosperms
- Clade: Eudicots
- Order: Caryophyllales
- Family: Cactaceae
- Subfamily: Cactoideae
- Genus: Disocactus
- Species: D. × jenkinsonii

Binomial name
- Disocactus × jenkinsonii (McIntosh) M.H.J.van der Meer

Synonyms
- Cactus × hybridus Van Geel; Cactus × jenkinsonii McIntosh; Cactus speciosissimus var. lateritius Lindl.; Disocactus × hybridus (Van Geel) Barthlott; Epiphyllum × vandesii G.Don; × Heliochia hybrida (Van Geel) P.V.Heath; × Heliochia jenkinsonii (McIntosh) P.V.Heath; Phyllocactus × franzii Hildm.; Phyllocactus × ignescens Haage; Phyllocactus × triumphans Serner

= Disocactus × jenkinsonii =

Species of cactus

Disocactus × jenkinsonii is a hybrid between Disocactus phyllanthoides and Disocactus speciosus. It is perhaps the most commonly grown orchid cactus and seems to survive and flower under most conditions. It has a very complex taxonomic history and has been mistaken for Disocactus ackermannii for a long time.

== History ==
In 1824, George Ackermann brought a part of a stem with him from Mexico and gave that to Tate who succeeded in flowering the specimen. Another specimen raised from Mexican seeds confirmed that this was really a novelty from Mexico and not a hybrid. The species was soon lost in cultivation. During the latter half of the 19th century, when cacti gave away to ferns, palms and orchids, only the toughest survived and as D. ackermannii is quite tricky it soon became lost in cultivation. About the same time some gardener succeeded in crossing D. phyllanthoides and D. speciosus producing a lovely red flowered hybrid. Being a vigorous, hardy, free-flowering plant, almost impossible to kill, it survived in collections. Unfortunately it was confused with the true D. ackermannii so when Britton and Rose published The Cactaceae, the switch had been made and the true species was forgotten. What Britton and Rose describe under Epiphyllum ackermanni is the hybrid, not the species. In 1943, Charles Gilles rediscovered the species in high, nearly unclimbable trees near Jalapa. He managed to collect living material and it was soon evident that the plant in cultivation was not the plant of Haworth. This hybrid is today correctly referred to as Disocactus × jenkinsonii 'Ackermannii'.

== Description ==
The stems are flat to triangular, often quite thick and succulent. The flowers are more or less funnel shaped, usually orange to red. The stigma lobes are white, never lavender.

== Cultivars ==
This cross has been remade many times creating several cultivars. However, many of them are confused today and cannot be identified.

== See also ==
- Epiphyllum hybrid
