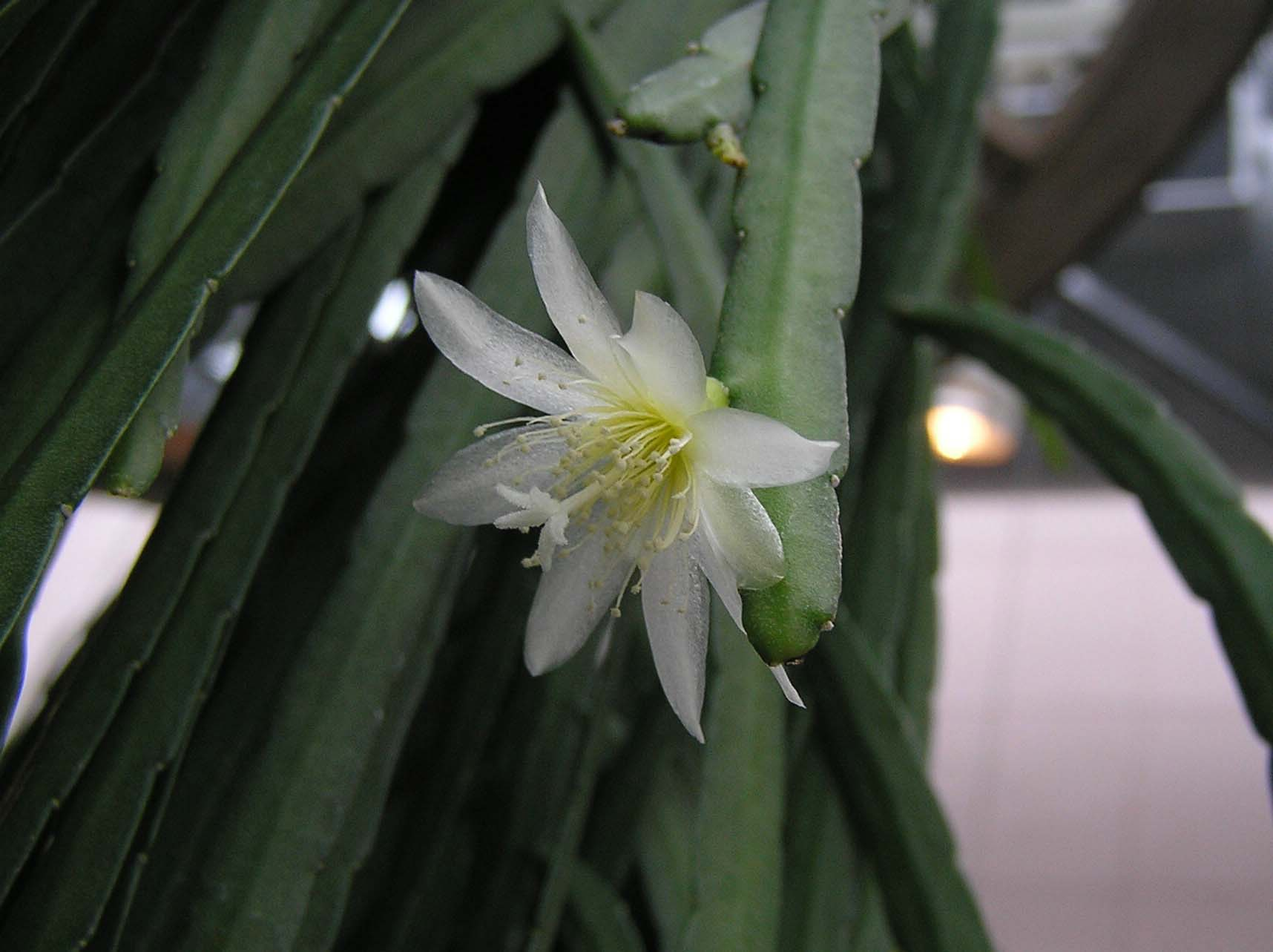
- Lymanbensonia crenata

Scientific classification
- Kingdom: Plantae
- Clade: Tracheophytes
- Clade: Angiosperms
- Clade: Eudicots
- Order: Caryophyllales
- Family: Cactaceae
- Subfamily: Cactoideae
- Tribe: Lymanbensonieae
- Genus: Lymanbensonia; Kimnach

= Lymanbensonia =

Genus of cactuses

Lymanbensonia is a genus of epiphytic cacti in the tribe Lymanbensonieae, found in Bolivia, Ecuador, and Peru. The genus was recently reinstated after it was found to be unrelated to Pfeiffera.

The genus Lymanbensonia is named after botanist Lyman Benson.

== Species ==
The following species are accepted:

- Lymanbensonia brevispina (Barthlott) Barthlott & N.Korotkova
- Lymanbensonia choquequiraensis Hoxey
- Lymanbensonia crenata (Britton) Doweld
- Lymanbensonia incachacana (Cárdenas) Barthlott & N.Korotkova
- Lymanbensonia micrantha (Vaupe) Kimnach
