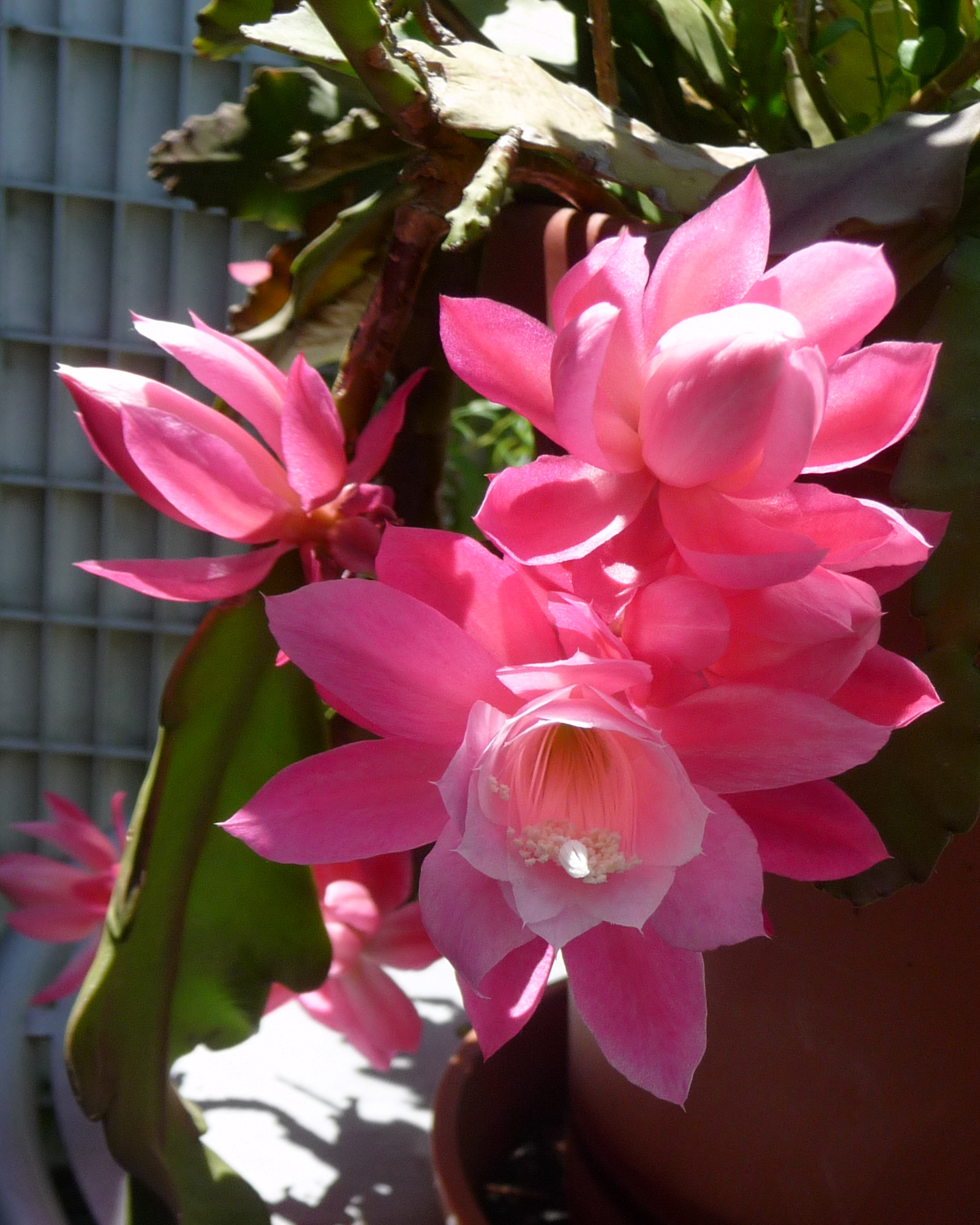

Conservation status
- Vulnerable (IUCN 3.1)

Scientific classification
- Kingdom: Plantae
- Clade: Tracheophytes
- Clade: Angiosperms
- Clade: Eudicots
- Order: Caryophyllales
- Family: Cactaceae
- Subfamily: Cactoideae
- Genus: Disocactus
- Species: D. phyllanthoides

Binomial name
- Disocactus phyllanthoides (DC.) Barthlott

Synonyms
- Cactus alatus Willd.; Cactus elegans Link; Cactus phyllanthoides DC.; Cactus speciosus Desf.; Cereus phyllanthoides (DC.) DC.; Epiphyllum phyllanthoides (DC.) Sweet; Heliocereus phyllanthoides (DC.) Doweld; Nopalxochia phyllanthoides (DC.) Britton & Rose; Opuntia speciosa Steud.; Phyllocactus jenkinsonii Haage; Phyllocactus phyllanthoides (DC.) Link; Phyllocactus plukenetii Kostel.

= Disocactus phyllanthoides =

Species of cactus

Disocactus phyllanthoides, the nopalxochitl or German empress, is a species of flowering plant in the cactus family Cactaceae. It is commonly grown as an ornamental houseplant. It is one of the three major species involved in creating the widely grown epiphyllum hybrids or "epis". The others are Disocactus speciosus and Disocactus crenatus.

== Description ==
Stems to 1 m long or more, branching, primary stems to 40 cm long, 6 mm thick, woody and terete at base, flattened at apex; secondary stems flat, lanceolate, acute, margins coarsely crenated or scalloped, obtusely toothed, with terete, stalk-like base, 15–30 cm long, 2,5–5 cm wide; areoles nude except for young growth; epidermis green or reddish, nearly smooth.

Flowers campanulate, funnel-shaped, diurnal and scentless, (Note: J. Borg (Cacti, 1951) report it as "sweet-scented".) 8–10 cm long, 7–9 cm wide, produced on year-old branches; pericarpel ovate with a few spreading bracteoles; entire receptacle 2.5–5 cm long, 7–10 mm thick; bracteoles more numerous than on the pericarpel, reflexed, green to blackish purple, naked in their axils; outer tepals lanceolate, opening irregularly before flowering, then spreading widely, rose-pink; inner tepals lanceolate-obtuse, more or less erect, pink, paler inside; stamens declinate, as long as the tepals, white; style as long as tepals, white, stigma lobes 5–7. Fruit ellipsoid, 3–4 cm with low ribs, green at first, later red. Seeds dark brown.

== Taxonomy ==
A distinct species related to Disocactus ackermannii, D. phyllanthoides has previously been placed in Nopalxochia, but the generic status for that taxon does not have much support. This species, like others of the former Nopalxochia, shows affinity to Weberocereus making the systematics of this group even more complex.

=== Etymology ===
Phyllanthoides (lat.) = similar to phyllanthus. This species was among the first flat-stemmed species to be described, and the name recalls that it is similar to the first described flat-stemmed cactus Cactus phyllanthus today - Epiphyllum phyllanthus. Some authors state that this plant first flowered in the garden of Château de Malmaison, belonging to the late Empress Joséphine de Beauharnais. This could explain popular names such as German Empress, Deutsche Kaiserin, Giant Empress, Drottningkaktus (Swedish for Queen's Cactus). This story could be a myth.

== Distribution and habitat ==
This species is endemic to Mexico and known from cloud forest in the states of Puebla and Veracruz at elevations of 1,500–1,850 m (4,920–6,070 ft) above sea level. It is an epiphyte that sometimes grows on rocks.

== Cultivation ==
Disocactus phyllanthoides is very easily cultivated. The soil should contain plenty of leaf-mould and the plant be given regular water and doses of fertilizer in summer. Best kept relatively cool and dry in winter, 10–15 °C (50–59 °F). Plants held under proper conditions can produce flowers at least three times a year, but the main flowering period is spring.

Under its synonym Nopalxochia phyllanthoides this plant has won the Royal Horticultural Society's Award of Garden Merit.

=== History ===
This plant has probably been in cultivation since prehistoric times, by the Indigenous peoples of South America and Mesoamerica. It was called Nopalxochitl by the Aztecs, which explains the former generic name Nopalxochia.

As with many of the early described cacti the history is somewhat unclear. Sims and Edwards state that it was discovered by the celebrated travellers Humboldt and Bonpland in April 1801, near the small village of Turbaco, near Cartagena, Colombia. It was reported by Bonpland to have first flowered at Château de Malmaison and at the Botanical Garden of Montpellier, France. However, this species was illustrated much earlier. Both Hernández (1651) and Plukenet (1691) illustrated the species.

=== Cultivars and hybrids ===
Some cultivar names are in use, but there is no evidence that these differ from the original species - 'Deutsche Kaiserin', 'Empress', 'German Empress'. However, 'Giant Empress' represents a somewhat larger clone with more uniform pink flowers.

Disocactus phyllanthoides is frequently used in hybrids. Together with Disocactus speciosus and Epiphyllum crenatum it forms the great trio behind the huge group of orchid cacti known today. Other species have been used, but not to the same extent as these three.
