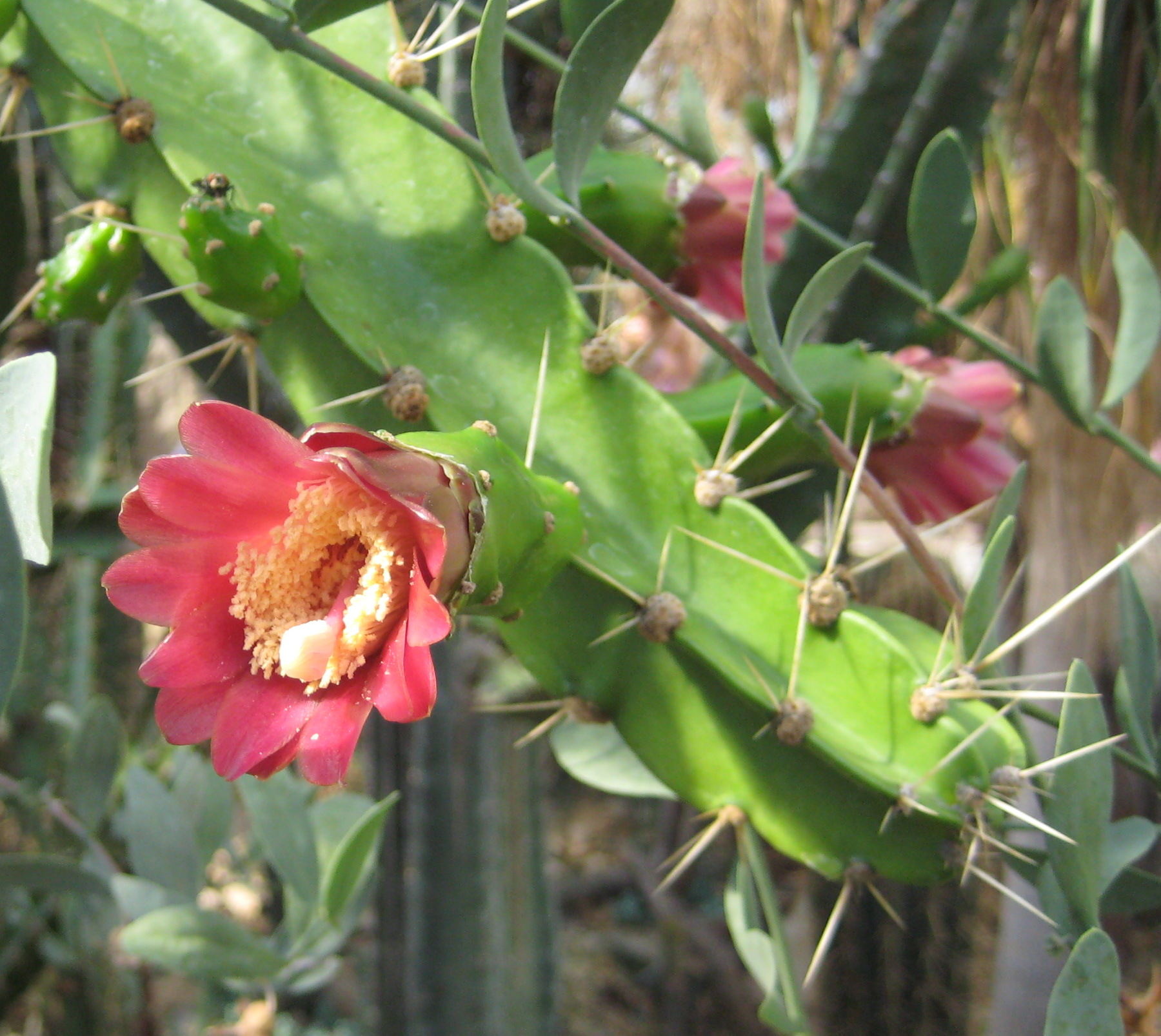
- Calymmanthium substerile

Scientific classification
- Kingdom: Plantae
- Clade: Tracheophytes
- Clade: Angiosperms
- Clade: Eudicots
- Order: Caryophyllales
- Family: Cactaceae
- Subfamily: Cactoideae
- Tribe: Lymanbensonieae
- Genus: Calymmanthium; F.Ritter
- Species: C. substerile

Binomial name
- Calymmanthium substerile F.Ritter

= Calymmanthium =

Species of plant

Calymmanthium is a monotypic genus of primitive tree-like cacti from northern Peru. The only species is Calymmanthium substerile (also known as C. fertile). It belongs to the tribe Lymanbensonieae. The young flowers of Calymmanthium are completely encased within the plant's pedicel until it is fully developed, at which time the growing yellow flower swells until it cracks the pedicel open, allowing pollinators access. The plant has an upright trunk, but many of the branches sprawl on the ground.

Diploperianthium F.Ritter (nom. inval.) has been brought into synonymy with this genus.
