= Mammillaria elegans =

Scientific classification
- Kingdom: Plantae
- Clade: Tracheophytes
- Clade: Angiosperms
- Clade: Eudicots
- Order: Caryophyllales
- Family: Cactaceae
- Subfamily: Cactoideae
- Genus: Mammillaria
- Species: M. elegans

Binomial name
- Mammillaria elegans DC., 1828

Synonyms
- Cactus elegans (DC.) Kuntze, 1891; Neomammillaria elegans (DC.) Britton & Rose

Species of cactus

Mammillaria elegans is a species of cacti in the tribe Cacteae. It is native to Mexico. Mammillaria elegans A.P. de Candolle 1828. is a 'nomen confusum' (confused name) also applied to Mammillaria haageana subsp. elegans and refers both to Mammillaria geminispina with latex in the stem (subgenus Mammillaria section Hydrochylus series supertextae ) and to Mammillaria haageana, without latex in the stem (subgenus Mammillaria, section Galactophylous, series Leucocephale) Habit: Solitary, seldom branching cactus.

Names brought to synonymy:

- Mammillaria elegans var. supertexta (Mart.) Schelle, 1907 or Mammillaria elegans var. lanata (Britton & Rose) B.Hofmann, 1986, synonyms for Mammillaria supertexta
