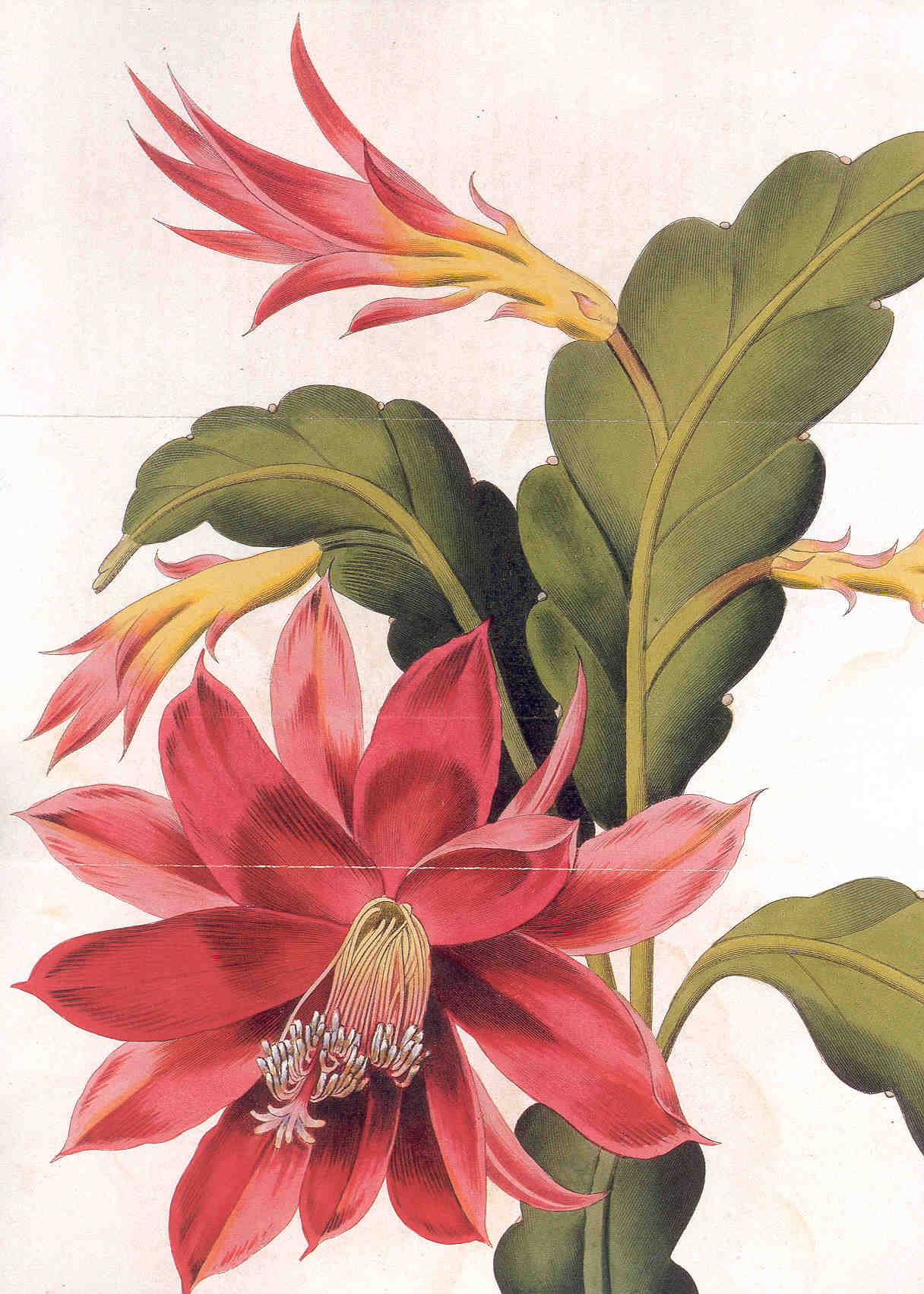
- From Curtis's Botanical Register, 1830

Conservation status
- Least Concern (IUCN 3.1)

Scientific classification
- Kingdom: Plantae
- Clade: Tracheophytes
- Clade: Angiosperms
- Clade: Eudicots
- Order: Caryophyllales
- Family: Cactaceae
- Subfamily: Cactoideae
- Genus: Disocactus
- Species: D. ackermannii

Binomial name
- Disocactus ackermannii (Haw.) Barthlott

Synonyms
- Cactus ackermannii (Haw.) Lindl.; Epiphyllum ackermannii Haw.; Heliocereus ackermannii (Haw.) Doweld; Nopalxochia ackermannii (Haw.) F.M.Knuth; Weberocereus ackermannii (Haw.) S.S.Ying

= Disocactus ackermannii =

Species of cactus

Disocactus ackermannii commonly called red orchid cactus is an epiphytic cactus from tropical forests in the states of Veracruz and Oaxaca, Mexico. In cultivation, it has been confused with Disocactus × jenkinsonii, a hybrid between D. phyllanthoides and D. speciosus.

== Description ==
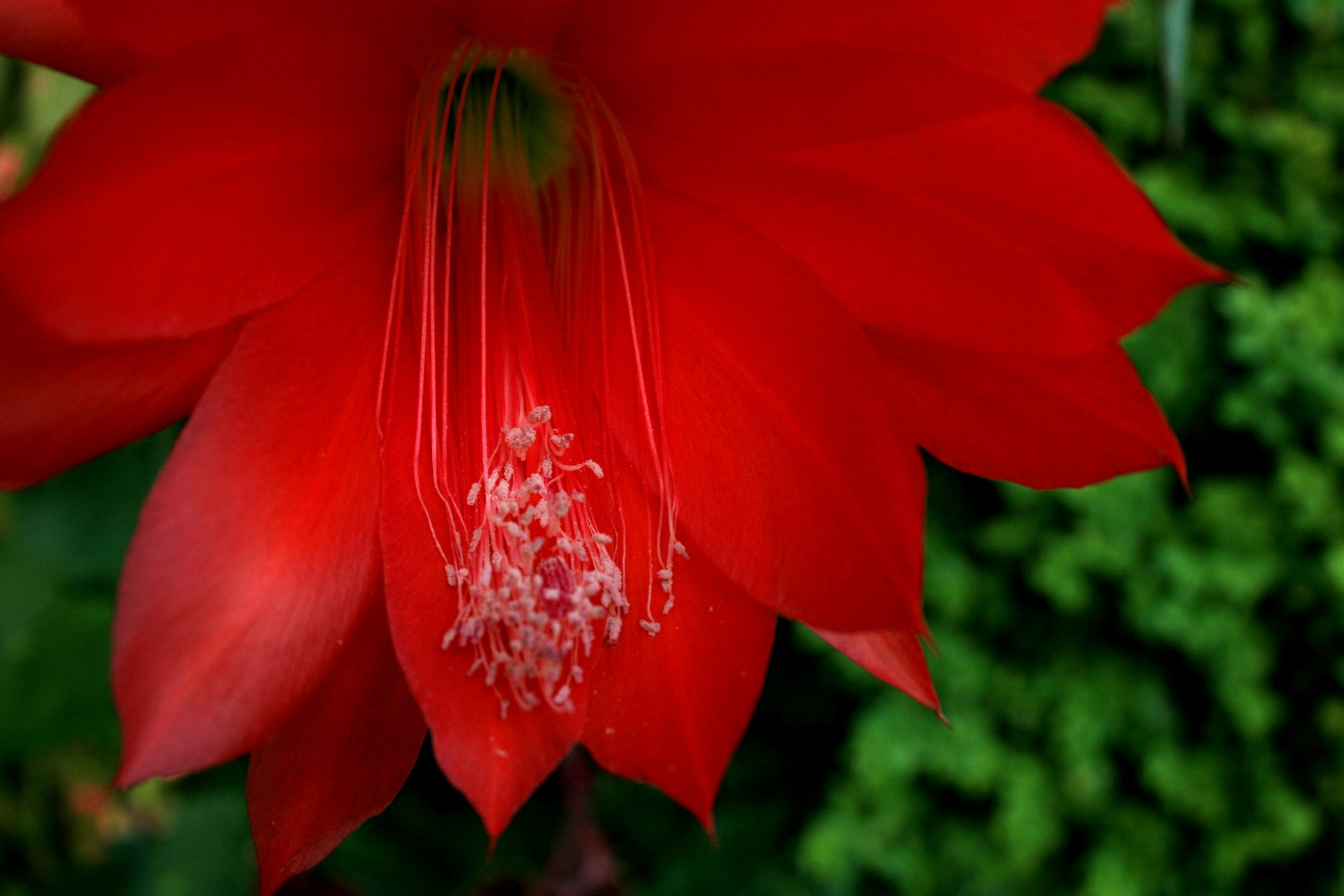
Close-up of the pistil and stamens

The stems of Disocactus ackermannii consist of a short rounded base, about 10–18 cm (4–7 in) long, followed by longer flattened leaf-like portions, 10–75 cm (4–30 in) long and 5–7 cm (2–3 in) wide with wavy edges. The plant branches from the base and arches downwards, being altogether some 1 m (3 ft) long. The scarlet flowers have greenish throats and are funnel shaped, 11–15 cm (4.3–5.9 in) or even longer and up to 15 cm (5.9 in) across. The filaments are red but the base is usually greenish. The anthers are pale rose. The style are red. The stigma is purplish. Fertilized flowers are followed by green to brownish red fruits, 4 cm (1.6 in) long and 2–2.5 cm (0.8–1.0 in) wide.

== Range and habitat ==
Disocactus ackermannii is native to the states of Chiapas, Oaxaca, Puebla, and Veracruz in southern Mexico. It inhabits cloud forests in the Sierra Madre de Oaxaca and Chiapas Highlands between 1,800 and 2,500 meters elevation.

== Taxonomy ==
The species was originally named Epiphyllum ackermannii by Adrian Hardy Haworth in 1829. There are three sets of synonyms:

- Haworth's Epiphyllum ackermannii was successively transferred to Cactus ackermannii (1830), Cereus ackermannii (1837), Phyllocactus ackermannii (1842) and Nopalxochia ackermannii (1935) before the current Disocactus ackermannii (1991).
- Phyllocactus weingartii A.Berger is an independent synonym.
- Nopalxochia conzattianum was named by Thomas Baillie MacDougall in 1947. It was successively transferred to Pseudonopalxochia conzattianum (1959) and Nopalxochia ackermannii var. conzattianum (1981) before the current Disocactus ackermannii var. conzattianum (1991).

Two varieties are currently recognized. D. a. var. ackermannii has longer cladodes (flattened stem portions), 35–75 cm (14–30 in) long, and longer tepals, 7–10 cm (3–4 in) long. D. a. var. conzattianum has shorter cladodes, 10–50 cm (4–20 in) long, shorter hypanthia, 2.8 cm (1.1 in) long, and shorter tepals, 4–6 cm (1.6–2.4 in) long.

== Cultivation ==
In cultivation, Disocactus × jenkinsonii, a hybrid between D. phyllanthoides and D. speciosus, has been confused with D. ackermannii and is often distributed under the name "Phyllocactus ackermannii".

Disocactus ackermannii has gained the Royal Horticultural Society's Award of Garden Merit.
