= Disocactus aurantiacus =

Scientific classification
- Kingdom: Plantae
- Clade: Tracheophytes
- Clade: Angiosperms
- Clade: Eudicots
- Order: Caryophyllales
- Family: Cactaceae
- Subfamily: Cactoideae
- Genus: Disocactus
- Species: D. aurantiacus

Binomial name
- Disocactus aurantiacus (Kimnach) Barthlott

Synonyms
- Disocactus speciosus subsp. aurantiacus (Kimnach) Ralf Bauer; Heliocereus aurantiacus Kimnach (basionym)

Species of plant

Disocactus aurantiacus, known commonly in Spanish as nopalillo de Jinotega, is a species of succulent flowering plant in the genus Disocactus, within the family Cactaceae. It is native to Honduras and Nicaragua.

== Description ==
Disocactus aurantiacus is a species of hanging epiphytic cactus that grows on trees. It is shrubby in habit and branches at the base, and it can reach 3 meters or more in length. The stems may have 2 to 5 ribs, or may instead be flattened and leaflike. Initially, they are erect, but with age, they hang down. Their margins are dentate or lobulate. They can reach 1 meter in length.

The angular stems measure 1 to 2 cm in diameter, and the flattened stems measue 1.5 to 3 cm in width. On the stems are areoles; these have 6 hairy spines (which may be absent). The areoles are cream-colored, measure up to 1.5 cm in length, and are spaced 4 to 7 cm apart.

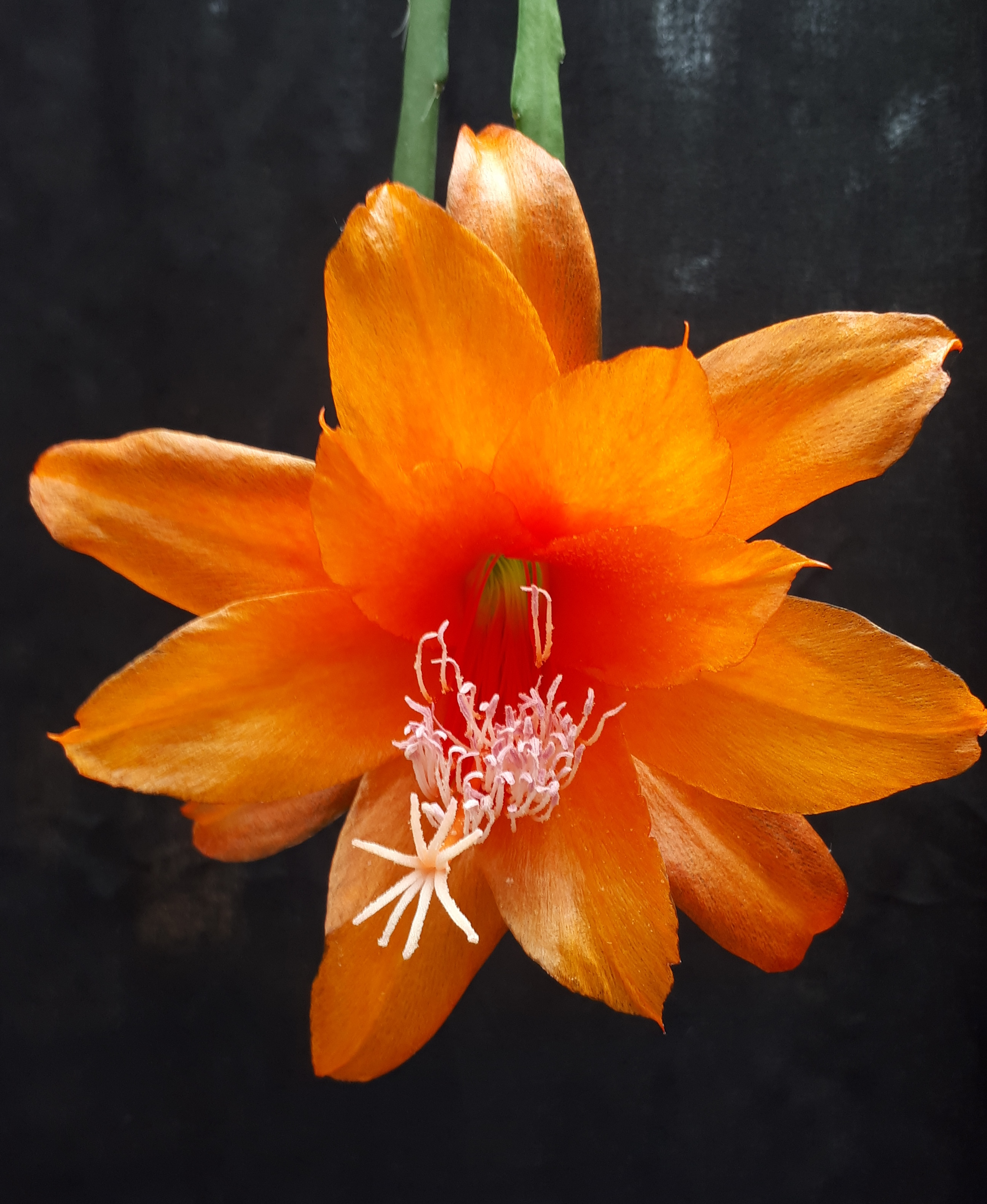
Flower

The flowers are large and solitary, and form on the distal halves of the branches. They measure 12.5 to 15.5 cm in length and 10 to 11 cm in diameter. They are funnel-shaped and curved upwards, and are light yellow to medium orange in color, with a slight magenta tinge. The style is 9 to 13 cm long. This species tends to flower in late spring and early summer.

The fruits are ellipsoid and yellow-green in color with a pink tinge. They can reach 7 cm in length.

== Distribution and habitat ==
Disocactus aurantiacus is native to Honduras and Nicaragua and is primarily found in the seasonally-dry tropical biome at elevations of 1500 to 1850 meters above sea level.

It grows on trees as an epiphyte in cloud forests. Its roots attach themselves to the host tree's bark to anchor the plant, but this means that the only access to water and nutrients is via rain and organic matter falling from above. Furthermore, it always grows under the canopy of a tree, and is never exposed to direct sunlight.

== Taxonomy ==
This species was first described as Heliocereus aurantiacus, a name published in 1974 by the American botanist Myron William Kimnach in the scientific journal Cactus and Succulent Journal 46: 67.

Later, the German botanist Wilhelm Barthlott transferred the species to the genus Disocactus, renaming it Disocactus aurantiacus. He registered these changes in the scientific journal Bradleya 9: 87, published in 1991.

Etymology

- Disocactus: the genus name is derived from the Greek words dis (meaning "twice"), isos (meaning "equal"), and kaktos (meaning "thistle" or "spiny plant"), in reference to the flattened, leaflike stems (with two identical sides) present in the species of this genus.
- aurantiacus: the specific epithed is derived from the Latin word aurantĭăcus (meaning "orange"), referring to the orange flowers of this species.

== Cultivation ==
Disocactus aurantiacus is mainly cultivated as an ornamental due to its attractive hanging stems and beautiful flowers. This species prefers a well-drained substrate, similar to other cactus species. It requires moderate watering, but the substrate should be allowed to dry completely between irrigations since excessive water around the roots may damage the plants.

It requires bright, indirect light, although it can tolerate some direct sun in the earliest and latest hours of the day. Prolonged exposure to direct sun can result in sunburning. Optimal growth is achieved at warm temperatures (between 15 ºC and 27 ºC, or between 59 ºF and 80.6 ºF). It is not frost-hardy and must be protected from the cold. Low environmental humidity is good for its growth. These factors make it a good houseplant.

Disocactus aurantiacus is most often propagated via cuttings: a healthy section of a stem is cut off and then left to dry and form callus for a few days before being planted in a well-drained substrate.

This species is commonly affected by mealybugs and spider mites; regular examinations of the plant and ensurance of good ventilation can help prevent the appearance of these pests. Furthermore, excessive irrigation may favor fungal infections.
