= Lymanbensonia choquequiraensis =

Scientific classification
- Kingdom: Plantae
- Clade: Tracheophytes
- Clade: Angiosperms
- Clade: Eudicots
- Order: Caryophyllales
- Family: Cactaceae
- Subfamily: Cactoideae
- Genus: Lymanbensonia
- Species: L. choquequiraensis

Binomial name
- Lymanbensonia choquequiraensis Hoxey

Species of plant

Lymanbensonia choquequiraensis is a species of succulent flowering plant in the genus Lymanbensonia, within the family Cactaceae. It is endemic to the department of Cusco in southern Peru.

== Description ==
Lymanbensonia choquequiraensis is a species of cactus that may grow as a lithophyte on exposed rocky surfaces or as an epiphyte on trees. Its stems are erect, arched, or pendent, and measure 1 to 2 meters in length and 2 to 2.5 cm in diameter. This species does not develop adventitious roots. The plant branches close to the ends of the stems.

The stems have up to 4 ribs; these are prominent and crenate. They reach up to 1 cm in height above the stem just below the areoles, and up to 0.7 cm in height just above them. The areoles measure approximately 4 mm in diameter; they are covered in a light gray felt-like covering and are separated by a distance of approximately 2.5 cm. Each areole has 10 to 12 straight spines, which are brown in color and measure 1 to 1.5 cm in length. There do not appear to be differentiated central and radial spines.

Flower

The flowers usually develop solitarily on the areoles. They measure approximately 1.5 cm in length and have an opening that measures approximately 5 mm across. The 8 or so inner tepals are an intense pink color, and measure approximately 1 cm in length and 5 mm in width. They are slightly recurved, and are rounded at the apex. The 6 or so external tepals measure 7 to 8 mm in length and 4 to 5 mm in width. They are an intense pink color, as with the inner tepals, and have a slightly fleshy texture.

The pericarpel measures approximately 3 mm in length. It is yellowish-pink in color and exhibits small green podaria measuring approximately 1 mm in length. There are no spines or trichomes. The nectar chamber is open and measures approximately 2 mm in length. The style reaches 1 cm in length; it is light pink and becomes lighter in color towards the base. The stigma lobes are white, and measure approximately 1 mm in length. The 12 or so stamens are situated in a ring approximately 2 mm above the nectar chamber. They measure approximately 4 mm in length, and are white in color. The anthers reach 1 mm in length and produce yellow pollen.

The fruit is more or less spherical, measuring approximately 1 cm in diameter. It has no spines or trichomes. It becomes light pink in color when mature. Immature fruits are pinkish-orange in color and retain the green scales of the pericarpel. The fruit exhibits around 6 scales measuring approximately 4 mm in width and less than 1 mm in height; these are the same color as the fruit. The dry flower remnants stay firmly attached to the fruit; these measure approximately 5 mm in length, with an attachment point to the fruit measuring approximately 3 mm in diameter. The rind of the fruit, which surrounds the seed chamber, is approximately 3 mm thick.

The seeds are black and relatively few in number, with a maximum of 12 per fruit. They are found in the fruit's central cavity, which measures 3 to 4 mm in width.

== Distribution and habitat ==
Lymanbensonia choquequiraensis is native to the area around the Inca archaeological site of Choquequirao, in the department ofCusco in southern Peru.

It grows on exposed rocky surfaces and on very steep slopes, although it may also grow as an epiphyte on trees. In both habitats, it grows alongside mosses and a diverse range of other plants, including bromeliads, orchids, and peperomias. The only other cacti that grow nearby are certain species in the genus Echinopsis, although these may be introduced.

== Taxonomy ==
Lymanbensonia choquequiraensis was described by the botanist Paul Hoxey and published for the first time in the scientific journal Cactus and Succulent Journal 92: 233 in 2020.

Etymology

- Lymanbensonia: the genus name honors the American botanist Lyman Benson (1909 - 1993), author of the book The Cacti of the United States and Canada.
- choquequiraensis: the specific epithet references the Inca archaeological site of Choquequirao, near which this species was discovered. The Latin suffix -ensis is common within scientific nomenclature when indicating the origin of a species.

== Conservation status ==
It has been proposed that this species should be classified as being Data Deficient on the IUCN Red List. This category indicates that the current available information about this species' conservation status is not sufficient to precisely determine its risk of extinction. This is due to the small volume of available data and the species' restricted geographical distribution. However, the type locality of the species is within the Choquequirao Regional Conservation Area, granting the species a high degree of protection.

== Gallery ==
In habitat in La Convención, Cusco, Peru

Stem with flowers

Flower and spines

Stem with fruit

Fruit
