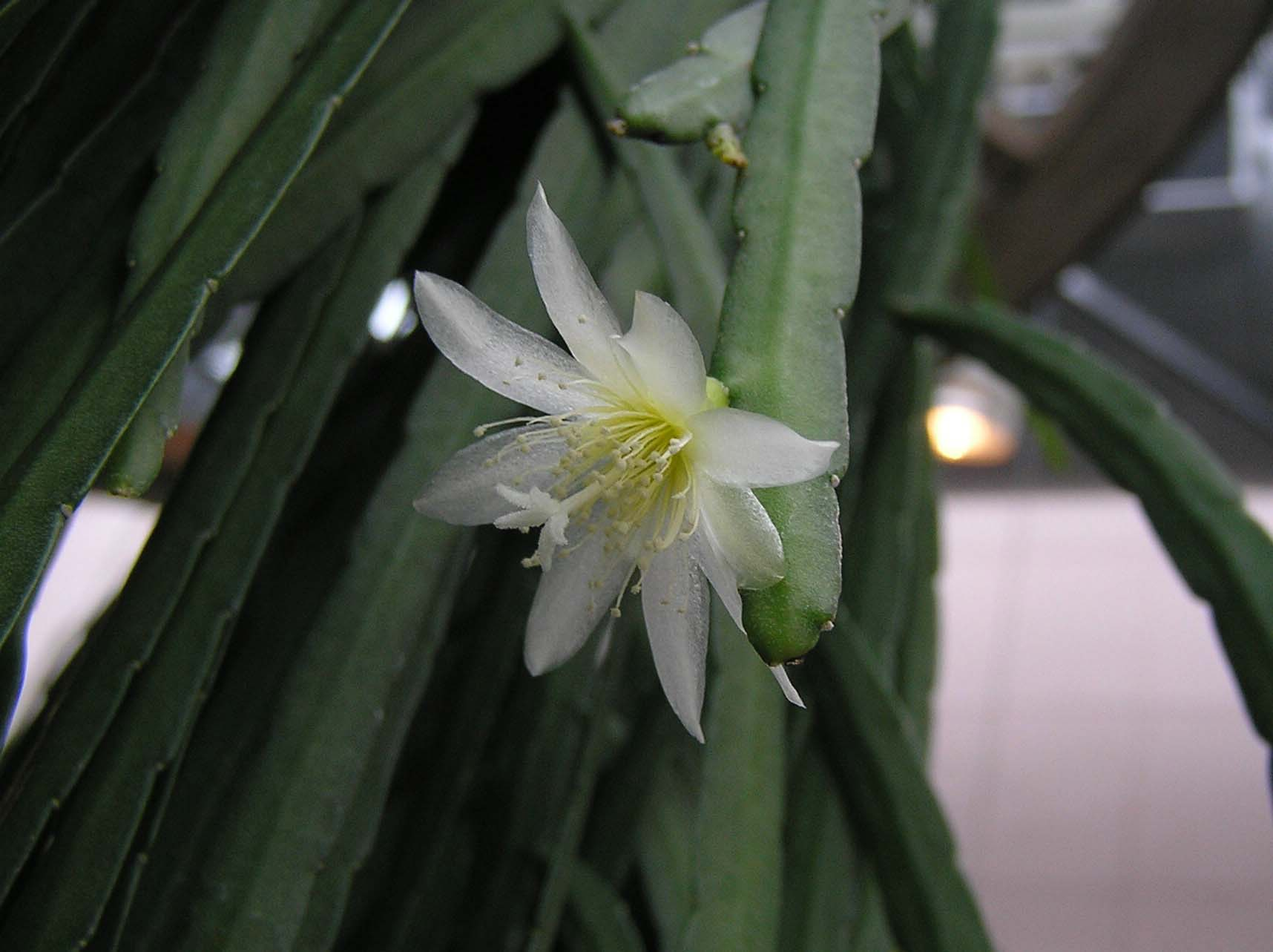
- Lymanbensonia crenata

Scientific classification
- Kingdom: Plantae
- Clade: Tracheophytes
- Clade: Angiosperms
- Clade: Eudicots
- Order: Caryophyllales
- Family: Cactaceae
- Subfamily: Cactoideae
- Tribe: Lymanbensonieae; N.Korotkova & Barthlott

Genera
- See text

= Lymanbensonieae =

Tribe of cacti

Lymanbensonieae is a tribe of cacti belonging to the Cactoideae subfamily. It was recently created after the genus Lymanbensonia was found to be sister to Calymmanthium.

== Genera ==
- Calymmanthium
- Lymanbensonia
