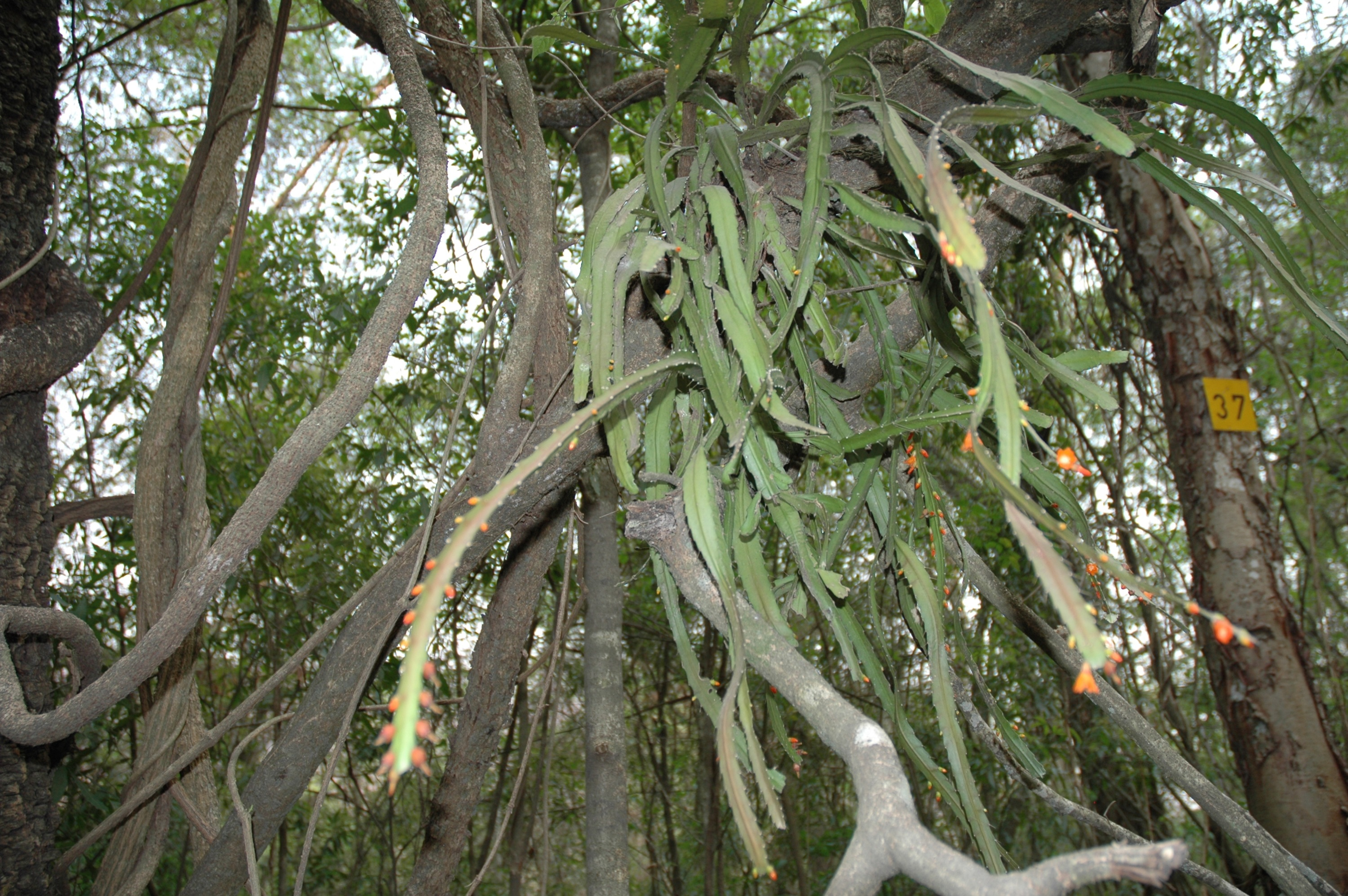
- Growing epiphytically in Calilegua National Park, Argentina
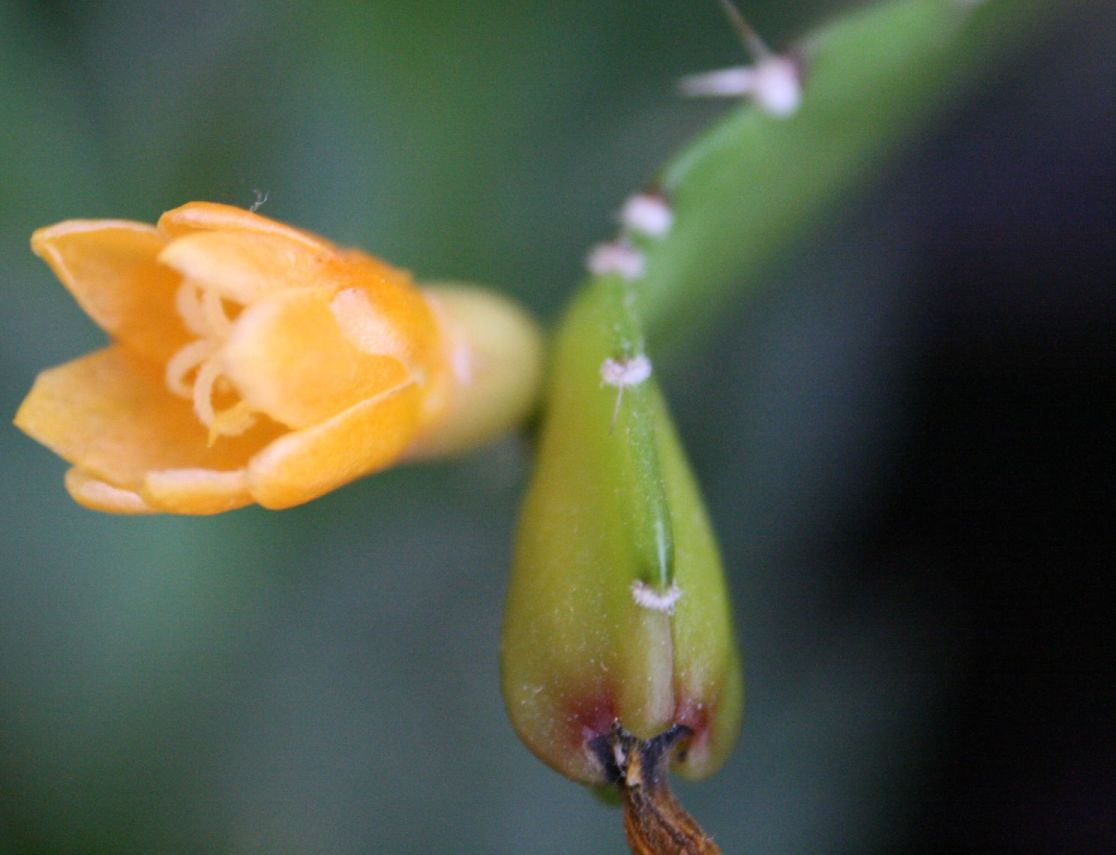
- Close-up of flower

Conservation status
- Least Concern (IUCN 3.1)

Scientific classification
- Kingdom: Plantae
- Clade: Tracheophytes
- Clade: Angiosperms
- Clade: Eudicots
- Order: Caryophyllales
- Family: Cactaceae
- Subfamily: Cactoideae
- Genus: Pfeiffera
- Species: P. monacantha

Binomial name
- Pfeiffera monacantha (Griseb.) P.V.Heath

Synonyms
- List: Acanthorhipsalis incahuasina Cárdenas; Acanthorhipsalis monacantha (Griseb.) Britton & Rose; Acanthorhipsalis monacantha subsp. kimnachii Doweld; Acanthorhipsalis monacantha var. samaipatana (Cárdenas) Backeb.; Hariota monacantha (Griseb.) Kuntze; Lepismium monacanthum (Griseb.) Barthlott; Lepismium monacanthum subsp. espinosum (Kimnach) Süpplie; Pfeiffera incahuasina (Cárdenas) P.V.Heath; Pfeiffera incahuasina var. samaipatana (Cárdenas) P.V.Heath; Rhipsalis monacantha Griseb.; Rhipsalis monacantha var. espinosa Kimnach; Rhipsalis monacantha var. samaipatana Cárdenas

= Pfeiffera monacantha =

Species of cactus

Pfeiffera monacantha (syn. Rhipsalis monacantha), the one‑spined wickerware cactus, is a species of epiphytic cactus, native to Bolivia and northwest Argentina. As its synonym Rhipsalis monacantha it has gained the Royal Horticultural Society's Award of Garden Merit.

== Subtaxa ==
The following subspecies are accepted:

- Pfeiffera monacantha subsp. kimnachii (Doweld) Ralf Bauer
- Pfeiffera monacantha subsp. monacantha
