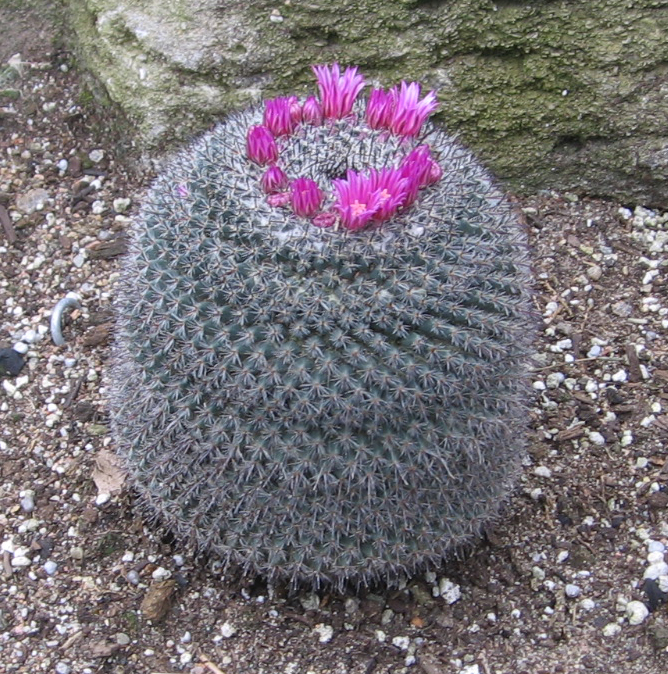

Conservation status
- Endangered (IUCN 3.1)

Scientific classification
- Kingdom: Plantae
- Clade: Embryophytes
- Clade: Tracheophytes
- Clade: Spermatophytes
- Clade: Angiosperms
- Clade: Eudicots
- Order: Caryophyllales
- Family: Cactaceae
- Subfamily: Cactoideae
- Genus: Mammillaria
- Species: M. supertexta

Binomial name
- Mammillaria supertexta Mart. ex Pfeiff.

Synonyms
- Mammillaria martinezii Backeb. Mammillaria lanata (Britton & Rose) Orcutt

= Mammillaria supertexta =

Species of cactus

Mammillaria supertexta is a species of cactus in the tribe Cacteae. It is endemic to Oaxaca, Mexico.

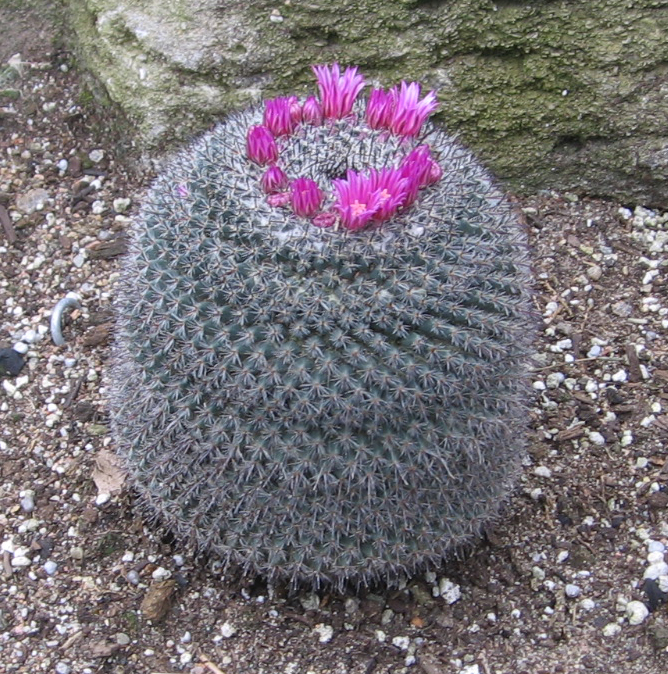

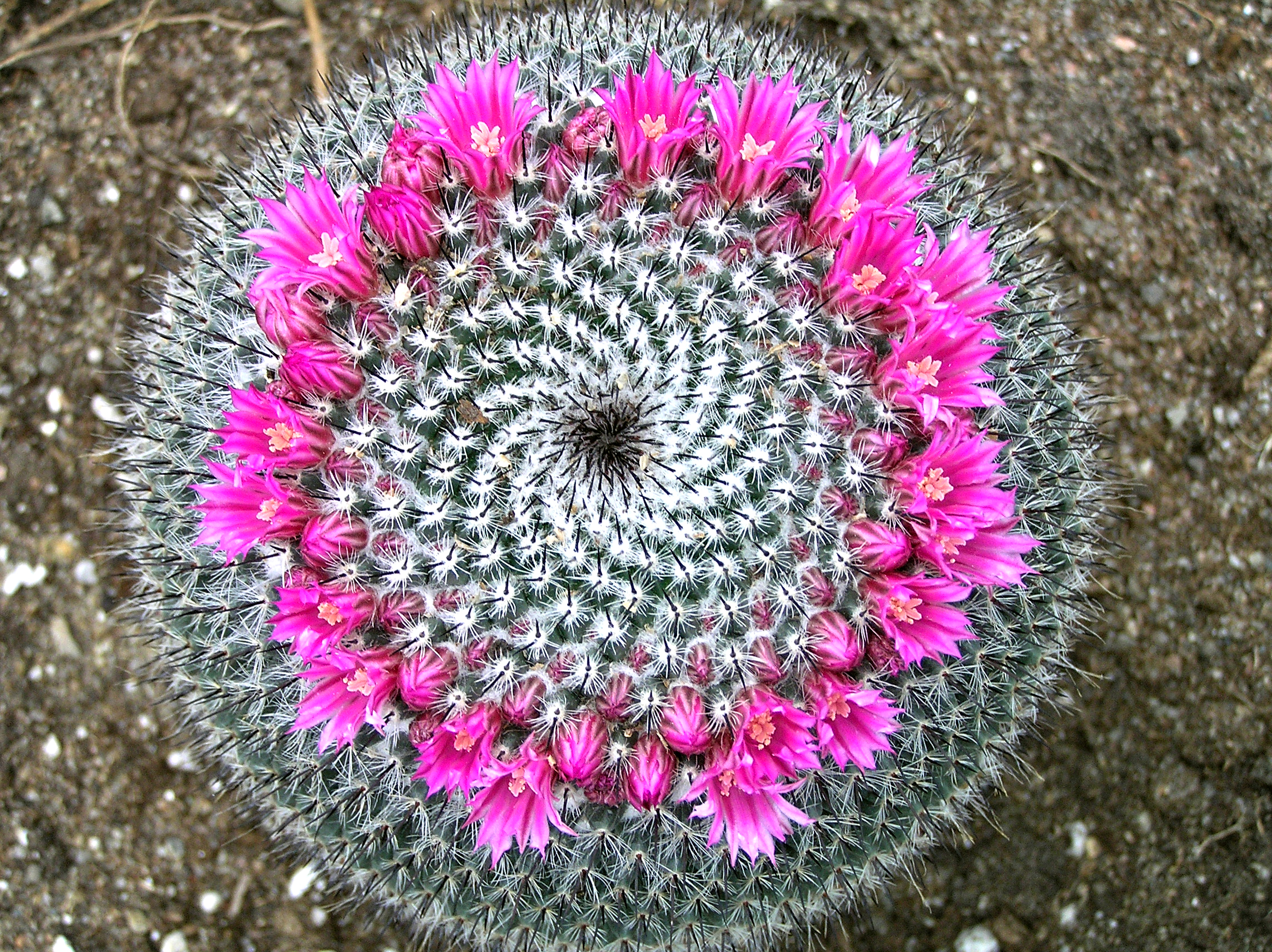
