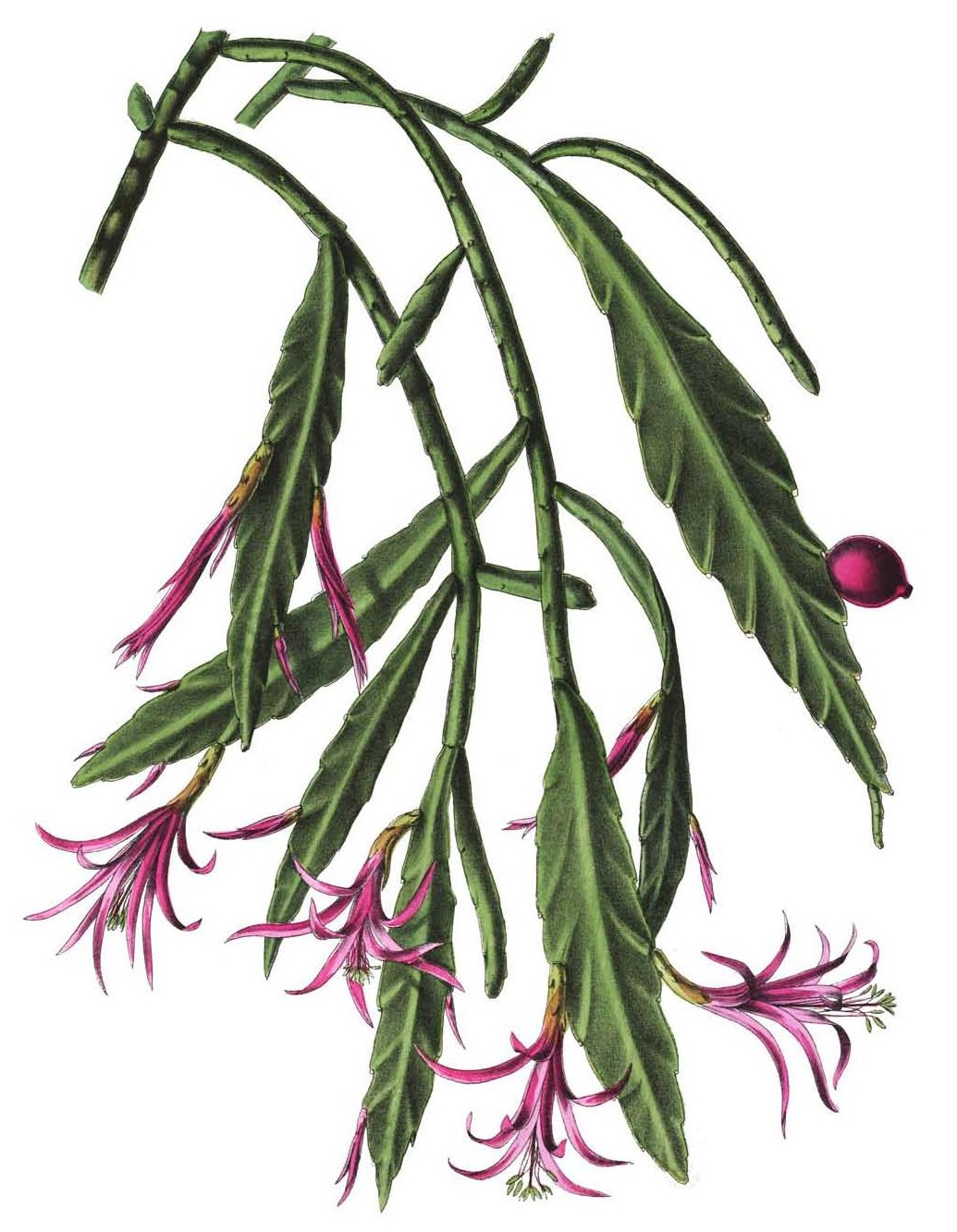
- Disocactus biformis

Scientific classification
- Kingdom: Plantae
- Clade: Tracheophytes
- Clade: Angiosperms
- Clade: Eudicots
- Order: Caryophyllales
- Family: Cactaceae
- Subfamily: Cactoideae
- Tribe: Hylocereeae
- Genus: Disocactus; Lindl.

Type species
- Disocactus biformis

Species
- See text.

= Disocactus =

Genus of cacti

Disocactus is a genus of epiphytic cacti in the tribe Hylocereeae found in Central America, the Caribbean and northern South America. It should not be confused with Discocactus, which is a different genus.

Species of Disocactus grow in tropical regions either on trees as epiphytes or on rocks as lithophytes. They have two distinct growth habits. Species such as D. phyllanthoides have stems which are round at the base but then become flattened and leaflike.

Many of the cultivated plants known as epiphyllum hybrids or just epiphyllums are derived from crosses between species of Disocactus (rather than Epiphyllum) and other genera in the Hylocereeae.

== Description ==
The species of the genus Disocactus grow as epiphytes or lithophytes and are shrubby, profusely branched, hanging, up to 3 m long. The shoots are ribbed or flattened, 3-angled or flattened, ribbon-like, 3–10 mm wide, remotely crenate and leaf-like. The main shoot, which rotates near the base, is only flattened at the top, while the side shoots are completely flattened. The thorns on the areoles are bare or with white wool and bristles 4–9 mm long.

The large flowers open during the day, appearing singly or rarely in groups from an areole. They are of different shapes and sizes, 10–15 cm long. The flowers are funnel-shaped or tubular, sometimes zygomorphic and rarely wheel-shaped, receptacular tube curved, embraced by foliaceous scales or 1–few bristles 3–5 mm long. They are bright red, orange, slightly reddish pinkish-orange, light yellow in color, or white. The stamens are often in two rows, with the upper ones sometimes forming a clear throat circle. The sepaloid parts of perianth are 10–30 mm long and 3–7 mm wide, yellow-green; the petaloid parts are 6–8 cm long and 1.5–2 cm wide, orange, reddish at base. The stamens are asymmetrically grouped along the lower side of the throat of the perianth; the style is exserted, 9–13 cm long with 8–9 stigma lobes.

Berry-like ellipsoid fruits are formed that are 7 cm long and 3 cm in diameter, almost bare or covered with a few small scales. They contain broad ovate seeds 1.5 to 2.4 millimeters long and 1 to 1.7 millimeters wide. The seeds are brown-black to almost black and are shiny or, more rarely, somewhat dull.

== Taxonomy ==
Pseudorhipsalis is sometimes included in Disocactus, but it is kept separate by the International Cactaceae Systematics Group. Aporocactus is formerly included in Disocactus, but it should be a genus on its own according to molecular evidence.

=== Species ===
Scientific name	Distribution	Image
Disocactus ackermannii (Haw.) Ralf Bauer	Mexico (Veracruz and Oaxaca)	
Disocactus anguliger (Lem.) M.Á.Cruz & S.Arias	Mexico	
Disocactus aurantiacus (Kimnach) Barthlott	Honduras, Nicaragua, Mexico	
Disocactus biformis (Lindl.) Lindl.	Guatemala, Honduras	
Disocactus blomianus (Kimnach) Lodé	Mexico (Chiapas)	
Disocactus crenatus (Lindl.) M.Á.Cruz & S.Arias	Mexico, Guatemala, Belize, El Salvador, Honduras	
Disocactus eichlamii (Weing.) Britton & Rose	Guatemala	
Disocactus heterodoxus (Standl. & Steyerm.) Lodé	Chiapas to SW Guatemala	
Disocactus hondurensis (Kimnach) Lodé	Honduras	
Disocactus lepidocarpus (F.A.C.Weber) M.Á.Cruz & S.Arias	Costa Rica to Panama	
Disocactus lodei Véliz, L.Velásquez & R.Puente	Mexico (Chiapas)	
Disocactus macdougallii (Alexander) Barthlott	Mexico (Chiapas)	
Disocactus macranthus (Alexander) Kimnach & Hutchison	Mexico (Oaxaca)	
Disocactus nelsonii (Britton & Rose) Linding.	Mexico (Chiapas)	
Disocactus phyllanthoides (DC.) Barthlott	Mexico (Pueblo, Veracruz-Llave)	
Disocactus quezaltecus (Standl. & Steyerm.) Kimnach	Guatemala	
Disocactus salvadorensis Cerén, J.Menjívar & S.Arias	El Salvador	
Disocactus speciosus (Cav.) Barthlott	Guatemala, Mexico	

Disocactus × capelleanus (syn. Disocactus kimnachii) is a natural hybrid between Disocactus ackermannii and Disocactus phyllanthoides found in southeastern Mexico.

=== Synonymy ===
The boundaries of the genera in the tribe Hylocereeae have been subject to considerable change and uncertainty, which is reflected in the number of names which have been used for Disocactus:

- Bonifazia Standl. & Steyerm.
- Chiapasia Britton & Rose
- Heliocereus (A.Berger) Britton & Rose
- Lobeira Alexander
- Nopalxochia Britton & Rose
- Pseudonopalxochia Backeb.
- Wittia K.Schum.
- Wittiocactus Rauschert
