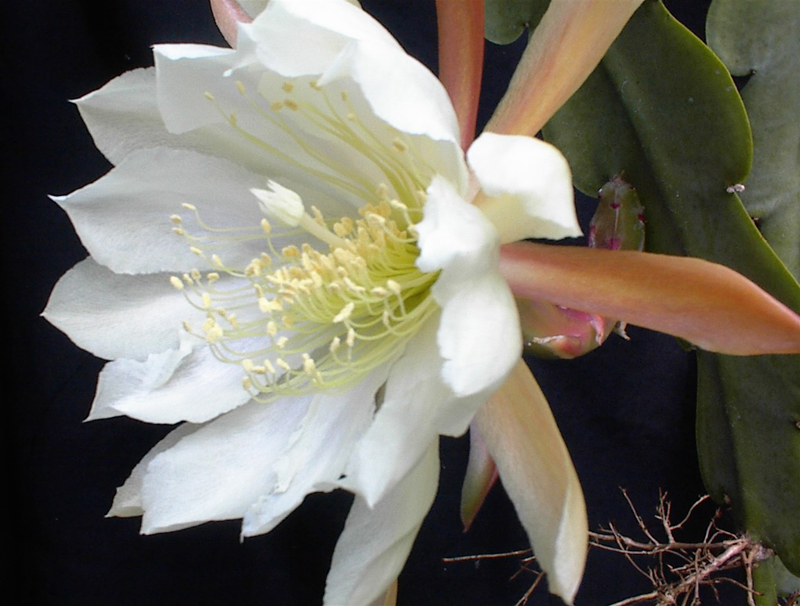
- Flower

Conservation status
- Least Concern (IUCN 3.1)

Scientific classification
- Kingdom: Plantae
- Clade: Tracheophytes
- Clade: Angiosperms
- Clade: Eudicots
- Order: Caryophyllales
- Family: Cactaceae
- Subfamily: Cactoideae
- Tribe: Hylocereeae
- Genus: Disocactus
- Species: D. crenatus

Binomial name
- Disocactus crenatus (Lindl.) M.Á.Cruz & S.Arias

Synonyms
- List: Of Disocactus crenatus; Cereus crenatus Lindl.; Epiphyllum cooperi Clover; Epiphyllum crenatum (Lindl.) G.Don; Phyllocactus caulorhizus Lem.; Phyllocactus crenatus (Lindl.) Lem. Of Disocactus crenatus subsp. kimnachii; ×Epinicereus cooperi (Regel) P.V.Heath; Epiphyllum crenatum subsp. kimnachii (Bavo) U.Guzmán; Phyllocactus belgica Laet-Contich; Phyllocactus cooperi Regel; Phyllocactus hildmannii Hildm.; Phyllocactus pfersdorffii Rümpler; ×Rowleyara hildmannii (Hildm.) P.V.Heath; ×Seleniphyllum cooperi (Regel) G.D.Rowley

= Disocactus crenatus =

Species of cactus

Disocactus crenatus, commonly known as the crenate orchid cactus, is a species of cactus cultivated for its large flowers. It is a critical parent plant in creating epiphyllum hybrids commonly cultivated worldwide.

== Description ==
=== D. crenatus subsp. crenatus ===
The stem is erect to ascending, and profusely branched. The primary stems are terete (tapering at both ends) and 3-angled for a short portion at the base, becoming ligneous (woody) and flat for most of their length. The secondary stems are flat, with flattened portions being 60-centimetre long (24 in), 6–10-centimetre wide (2.4–3.9 in), and stiff and rather succulent. The phylloclades are lanceolate to long linear, acute or obtuse, median nerve rather thick, margins deeply or coarsely crenate, lobes oblique; areoles at the bases of stems sometimes bearing hairs or small bristles, internodes (plant stem part between nodes) narrow or broad. The epidermis is green or gray-green and smooth.

The flowers are up to 18–29-centimetre long (7.1–11.4 in) and 15–20-centimetre wide (5.9–7.9 in). The species is nocturnal but may remain open for several days, becoming quite fragrant. The outer tepals are inserted within 2 cm of the receptacle apex, 10–12 cm long, broadly oblanceolate to linear, greenish yellow to tawny yellow or reddish amber. The outermost tepals are sometimes margined in red or streaked. The inner tepals are as long as outer tepals, spathulate to oblanceolate, acuminate to mucronate, white, creamy white, or greenish yellow. The Pericarpel (hypanthium) is 5-angled, 3 cm long, 1.5-1.7 cm thick, with acute, long-decurrent podaria, bracteoles (small bracts) subtening (2–8) spines up to 7 mm long, and green in color. The receptacle is 10–12 cm long, about 1.5 cm thick at its middle, and green (or often reddish) at the apex, or reddish throughout. It bears numerous linear to oblong keeled bracteoles. The bracleoles are 2–3 cm long and appear in a spread formation. The nectaries are about 3–4 cm long, stamens numerous, declinate, shorter than the tepals, inserted in two zones, the lower one about 4 cm long, from a point about 4 cm from the ovary chamber, the upper zone forming a throat circle about 2 cm above, filaments 5–7 cm long, pale yellow or pale greenish-yellow; style 15–20 cm long, as long or longer than stamens, 2–3 mm thick, widest at base. The 8 or 9 stigma lobes are white and papillose. The fruit is oblong to globose (globe-shaped), the podaria are long, decurrent, and acute.

=== D. crenatus subsp. kimnachii ===
This subspecies differs from the typical variety by: 4–6 cm wide stems, usually semicircular lobes; pericarpel and receptacle subterete (tapering at the bottom) in cross-section; pericarpel with subconical (somewhat cone shaped at the bottom) or obtuse, shortly decurrent podaria and with bracteoles subtending ca 6 (0-20) spines up to 12 mm long; outer tepals usually inserted within 4–8 cm of tube apex; fruit globose, the podaria short and decurrent, and obtuse.

== Taxonomy ==
The epithet crenatus denotes crenations (wavy-toothed) and refers to the crenated stem margins. The subspecies epithet kimnachii honors Myron Kimnach (1922–2018), a botanist mainly working with epiphytic cacti and Crassulaceae, and for many years working at the University of California, Berkeley, and Huntington Gardens. Kimnach was director of the Huntington Botanical Gardens for 25 years. He also edited the Cactus and Succulent Journal for the Cactus and Succulent Society of America and was Managing Editor of its peer-reviewed technical yearbook, Haseltonia for ten years.

This species is distinct. The flowers of Epiphyllum grandilobum are similar, but the stem morphology is quite different. Relationships and generic limits in the tribe Hylocereeae have long been unclear. A molecular phylogenetic study in 2016 showed that this species, which was then placed in the genus Epiphyllum, was firmly nested within Disocactus.

== Distribution and habitat ==
The natural range of Disocactus crenatus spans from Mexico, specifically encompassing Oaxaca and Chiapas, down to Honduras and Panama. It thrives as an epiphytic species, exhibiting a propensity to grow upon other plants, or alternatively, as a lithophytic entity, establishing itself on rocky surfaces. Flourishing within moist or damp forest settings, it occasionally takes root within oak forests. Its elevation typically ranges between 1,330 and 2,500 meters above sea level.

== Cultivation ==
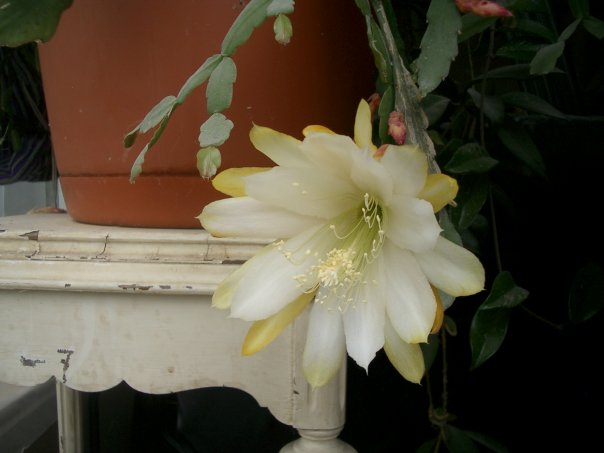
Blooming Christmas Cactus

This species was shown at an exhibition at the Royal Horticultural Society's Garden in 1844, and won the highest medal for a new introduction. It had been collected in Honduras five years earlier by Georges Ule Skinner and sent to Sir Charles Lemon who flowered it for the first time in 1843. John Lindley thought it to have originated in the island of Antigua. D. crenatus is the only species of Disocactus that has been used in hybridization to any extent. Most of the colored hybrids have mainly Disocactus genes and are perhaps better referred to as Disocactus hybrids rather than epiphyllum hybrids.

It is an easily cultivated, fast-growing epiphyte. It needs compost containing plenty of humus and sufficient moisture in summer. Should not be kept under 12 °C (53.5 °F) in winter. Can be grown in semi-shade or full sun. Extra light in the early spring will stimulate budding. Flowers in late spring or early summer.

The cultivar 'Cooperi' resembles D. crenatus subsp. kimnachii, differing only in having the outer petals at the apex of the tube. It was originally reported that 'Cooperi' was a hybrid involving Selenicereus, and Clive Innes stated that he "re-made" the cross between D. crenatus and Selenicereus grandiflorus, obtaining several plants identical to 'Cooperi'. However, it was shown in 1997 that this was not correct, with DNA analysis showing no evidence of Selenicereus.
