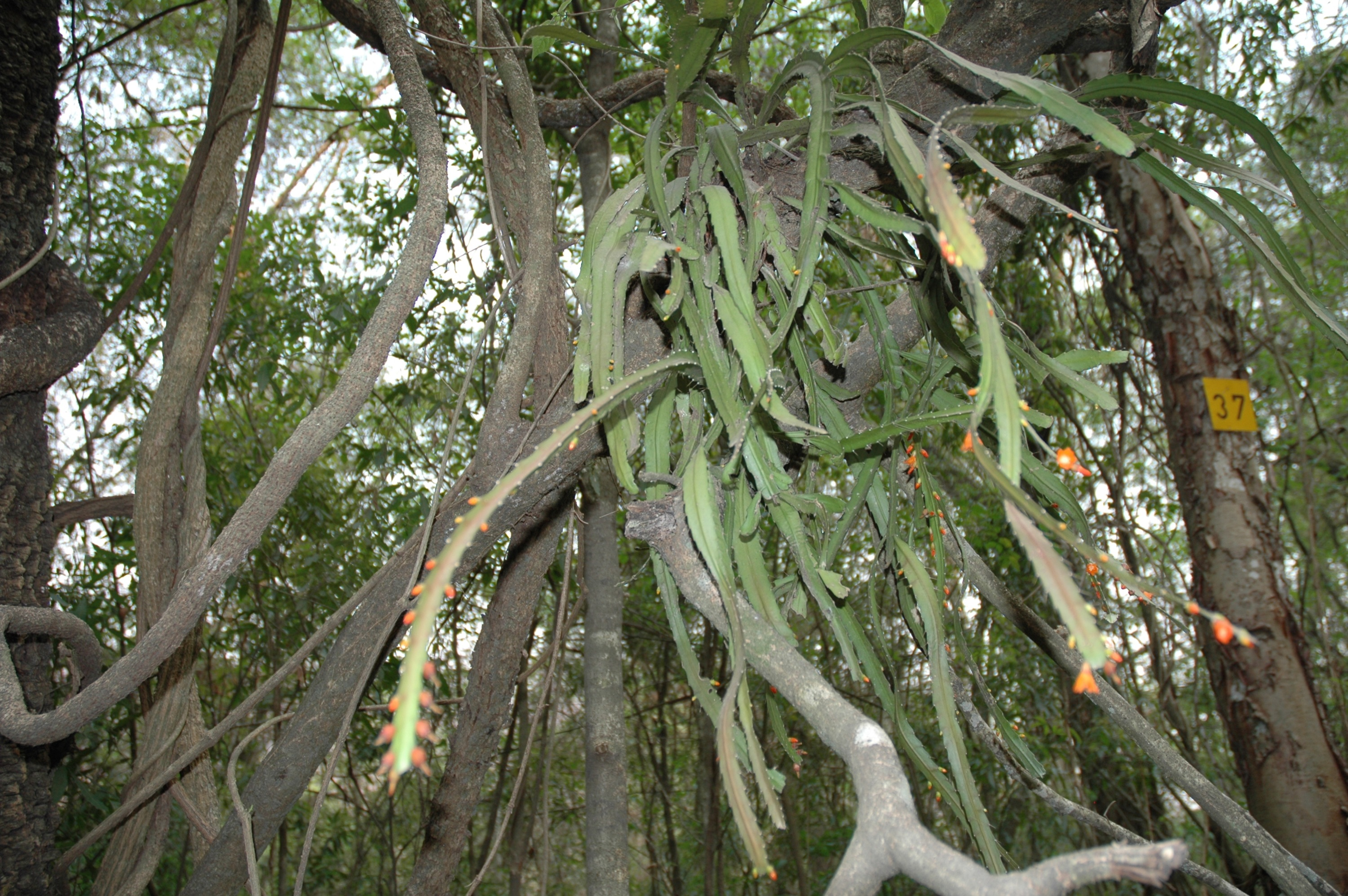
- Pfeiffera monacantha

Scientific classification
- Kingdom: Plantae
- Clade: Tracheophytes
- Clade: Angiosperms
- Clade: Eudicots
- Order: Caryophyllales
- Family: Cactaceae
- Subfamily: Cactoideae
- Tribe: Echinocereeae
- Genus: Pfeiffera; Salm-Dyck

Type species
- Pfeiffera ianthothele

Species
- See text

Synonyms
- Bolivihanburya Guiggi

= Pfeiffera =

Genus of Cactaceae plants

Pfeiffera is a genus of flowering plants in the family Cactaceae, found in Bolivia and northwest Argentina. There has been some debate about the circumscription of the genus. It is placed in the tribe Echinocereeae.

The genus name of Pfeiffera is in honour of Ludwig Karl Georg Pfeiffer (1805–1877), a German physician, botanist and conchologist. It was first described and published in Cact. Hort. Dyck., edt. 1844 on page 40 in 1845.

== Species ==
The following species are accepted:

Image	Scientific name	Distribution
	Pfeiffera asuntapatensis (M.Kessler, Ibisch & Barthlott) Ralf Bauer	Bolivia
	Pfeiffera boliviana (Britton) D.R.Hunt	Bolivia.
	Pfeiffera ianthothele F.A.C.Weber	Bolivia to NW. Argentina
	Pfeiffera miyagawae Barthlott & Rauh	Bolivia.
	Pfeiffera monacantha (Griseb.) P.V.Heath	Bolivia to NW. Argentina
	Pfeiffera paranganiensis (Cárdenas) P.V.Heath	Bolivia
