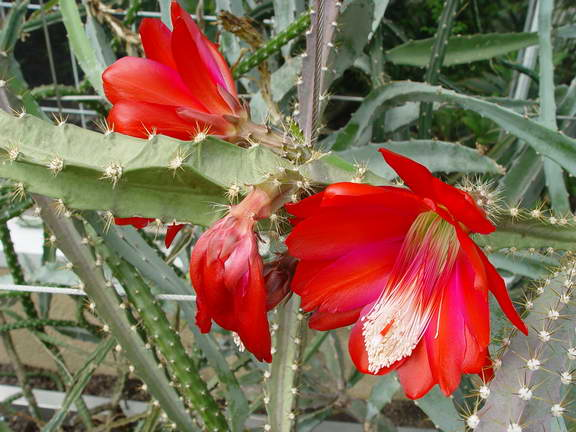
- Flowers in various stages of maturation
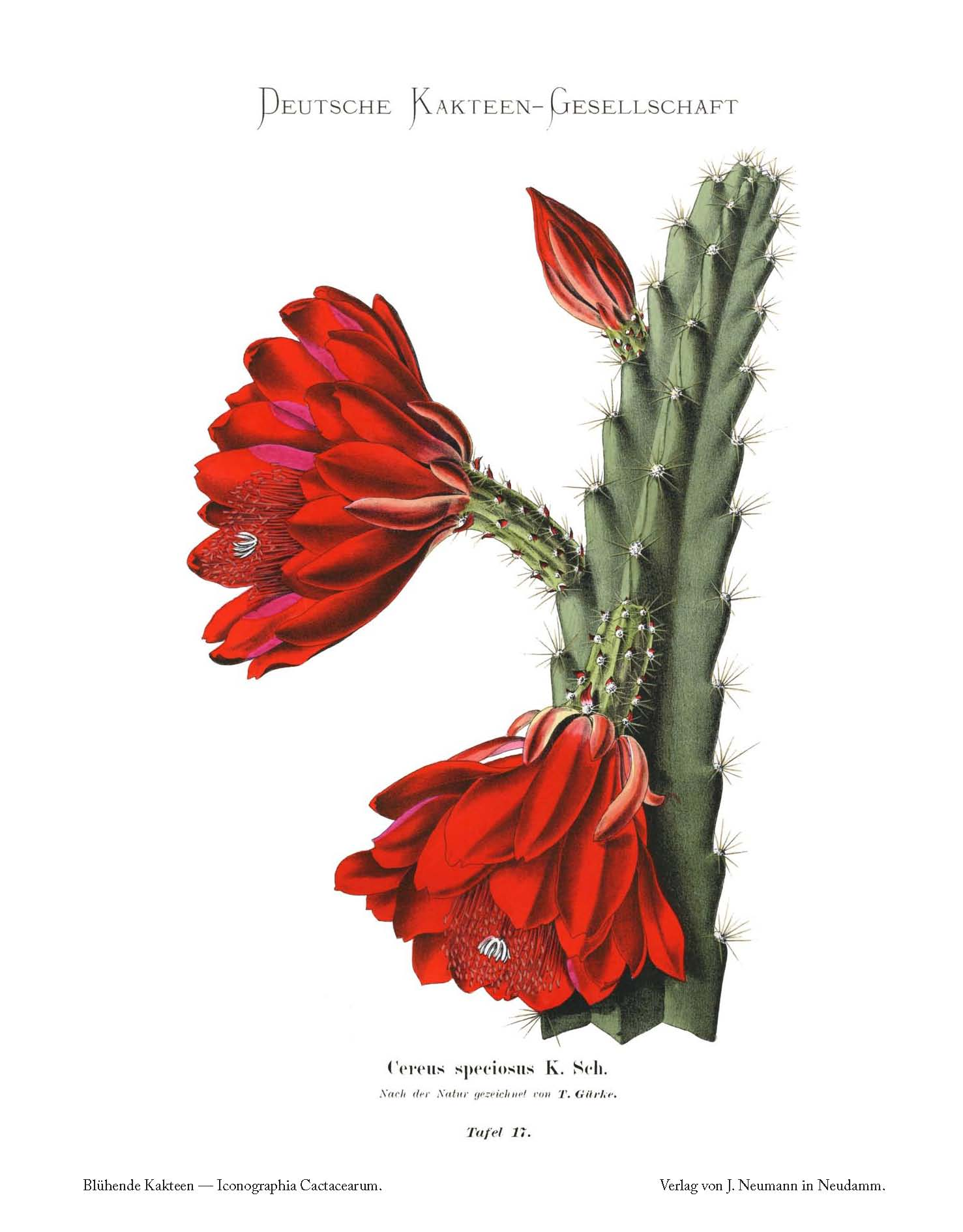
- Botanical illustration

Conservation status
- Least Concern (IUCN 3.1)

Scientific classification
- Kingdom: Plantae
- Clade: Embryophytes
- Clade: Tracheophytes
- Clade: Angiosperms
- Clade: Eudicots
- Order: Caryophyllales
- Family: Cactaceae
- Subfamily: Cactoideae
- Genus: Disocactus
- Species: D. speciosus

Binomial name
- Disocactus speciosus (Cav.) Barthlott

Synonyms
- List: Cactus speciosissimus Desf.; Cactus speciosus Cav.; Cereus amecamensis Heese; Cereus coccineus DC.; Cereus coccineus Salm-Dyck ex Pfeiff. & Otto; Cereus elegantissimus A.Berger; Cereus formosus J.Forbes; Cereus formosus Monv.; Cereus hybridus Otto; Cereus jenkinsonii Sweet; Cereus schrankii Zucc. ex Seitz; Cereus serratus Weing.; Cereus speciosissimus (Desf.) Sweet; Cereus speciosus (Cav.) Sweet; Cereus speciosus var. amecamensis (Heese) A.Berger; Cereus speciosus var. coccineus K.Schum.; Cereus superbus C.Ehrenb.; Disocactus aurantiacus var. blomianus (Kimnach) E.Meier; Disocactus cinnabarinus (Eichlam ex Weing.) Barthlott; Disocactus schrankii (Zucc. ex Seitz) Barthlott; Disocactus speciosus f. amecamensis (Heese) Barthlott; Epiphyllum speciosum (Cav.) Haw.; Heliocereus amecaensis (Heese) Britton & Rose; Heliocereus aurantiacus var. blomianus Kimnach; Heliocereus cinnabarinus (Eichlam ex Weing.) Britton & Rose; Heliocereus coccineus Britton & Rose; Heliocereus coccineus (DC.) Scheinvar; Heliocereus elegantissimus Britton & Rose; Heliocereus elegantissimus var. helenae Scheinvar; Heliocereus elegantissimus var. stenopetalus Bravo ex S.Arias, U.Guzmán & Gama; Heliocereus heterodoxus Standl. & Steyerm.; Heliocereus luzmariae Scheinvar; Heliocereus schrankii (Zucc. ex Seitz) Britton & Rose; Heliocereus schrankii var. elegantissimus (Britton & Rose) Backeb.; Heliocereus schrankii subsp. helenae (Scheinvar) Doweld; Heliocereus schrankii var. helenae (Scheinvar) Kimnach; Heliocereus schrankii subsp. luzmariae (Scheinvar) U.Guzmán; Heliocereus schrankii subsp. stenopetalus (Bravo ex S.Arias, U.Guzmán & Gama) Doweld; Heliocereus schrankii var. stenopetalus (Bravo ex S.Arias, U.Guzmán & Gama) Kimnach; Heliocereus serratus (Weing.) F.M.Knuth; Heliocereus speciosissimus (Desf.) Y.Itô; Heliocereus speciosus (Cav.) Britton & Rose; Heliocereus speciosus var. amecamensis (Heese) Bravo; Heliocereus speciosus subsp. amecamensis (Heese) Doweld; Heliocereus speciosus var. serratus (Weing.) Backeb.; Heliocereus speciosus var. superbus (Ehrenb.) Backeb.; Heliocereus superbus (C.Ehrenb.) A.Berger; Mediocactus coccineus (DC.) Britton & Rose; × Phyllocereus cinnabarinus (Eichlam) Knebel

= Disocactus speciosus =

Species of flowering plant

Disocactus speciosus, the sun cactus, is a species of flowering plant in the family Cactaceae. It is native to Mexico, Honduras and Guatemala, and has been introduced to the Canary Islands. As its synonym Heliocereus speciosus it has gained the Royal Horticultural Society's Award of Garden Merit.

== Subtaxa ==
The following subspecies are accepted:

- Disocactus speciosus subsp. blomianus (Kimnach) Ralf Bauer – Chiapas
- Disocactus speciosus subsp. cinnabarinus (Eichlam ex Weing.) Ralf Bauer – southern Mexico, Honduras
- Disocactus speciosus subsp. heterodoxus (Standl. & Steyerm.) M.Á.Cruz & S.Arias – Guatemala
- Disocactus speciosus subsp. speciosus
