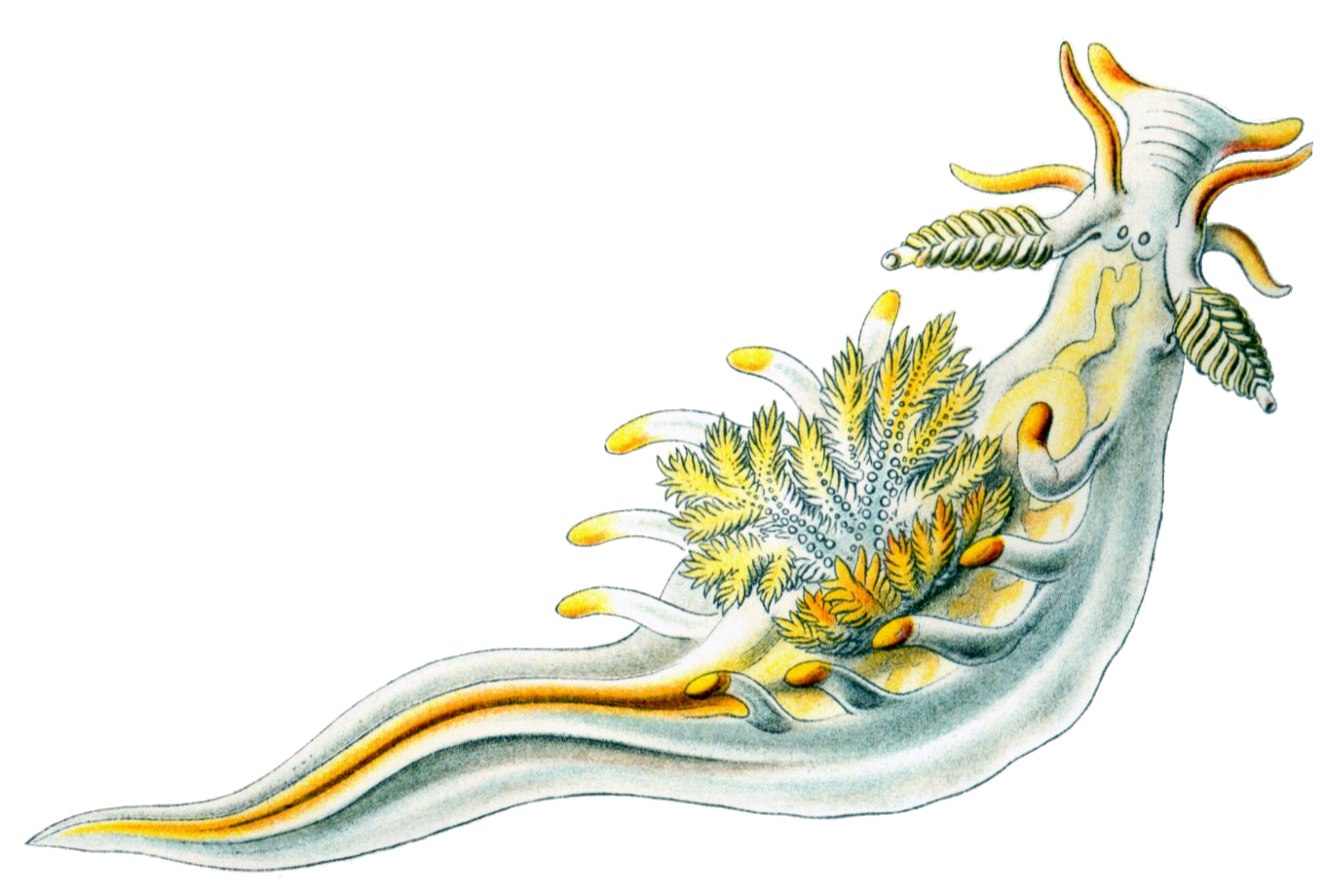
- Chromolithograph of Ancula gibbosa from Kunstformen der Natur (1904)

Scientific classification
- Kingdom: Animalia
- Phylum: Mollusca
- Class: Gastropoda
- Order: Nudibranchia
- Family: Goniodorididae
- Genus: Ancula
- Species: A. gibbosa

Binomial name
- Ancula gibbosa (Risso, 1818)

Synonyms
- Tritonia gibbosa Risso, 1818; Polycera cristata Alder, 1841; Miranda cristata (Alder, 1841); Ancula sulphurea Stimpson, 1853; Ancula pacifica MacFarland, 1905

= Ancula gibbosa =

Atlantic ancula

Species of gastropod

Ancula gibbosa, common name Atlantic ancula, is a species of dorid nudibranch. It is a marine gastropod mollusc in the family Goniodorididae.

== Distribution ==
This species was described from the Mediterranean Sea at Nice, France. It has a wide distribution from there along the Atlantic coast to Norway, Greenland, Iceland and across to New England on the coast of North America. Ancula pacifica apparently has a number of colour varieties which closely approach this species and is currently believed to be a synonym.

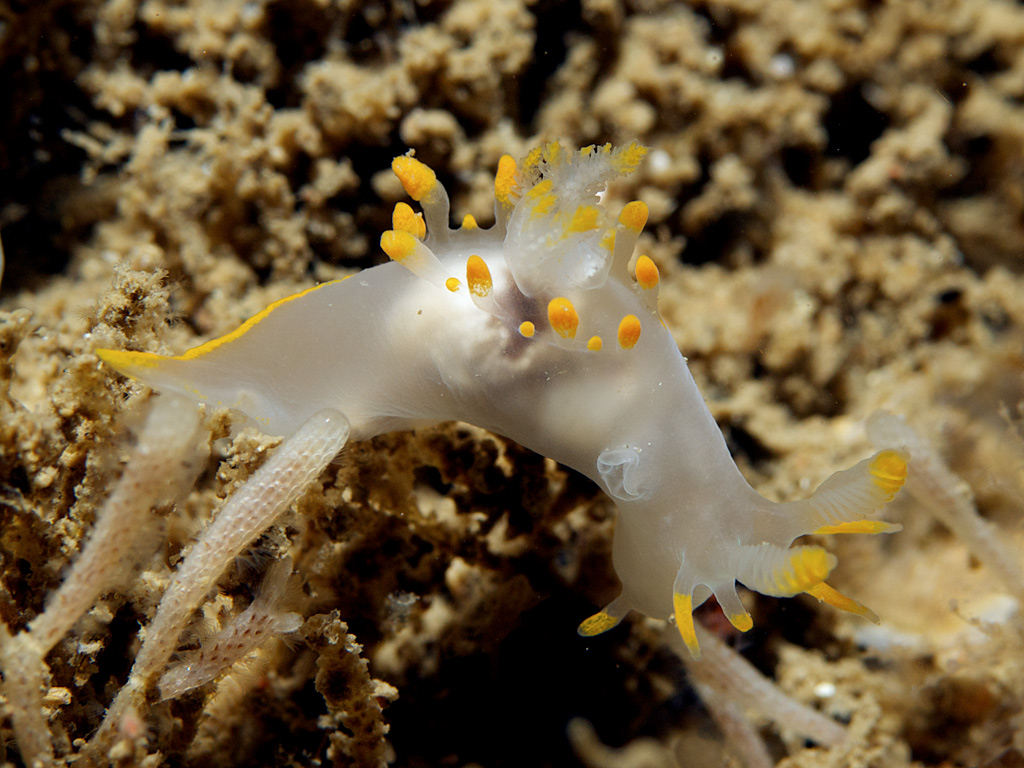
The nudibranch Ancula gibbosa, Rathlin Island, Northern Ireland.

== Description ==
This goniodorid nudibranch has a translucent white body with yellow or white tipped processes.

== Ecology ==
Ancula gibbosa feeds on Ectoprocta. It has been reported to possibly feed on a variety of sessile organisms, but these are just the substratum to which the ectoprocts are attached.
