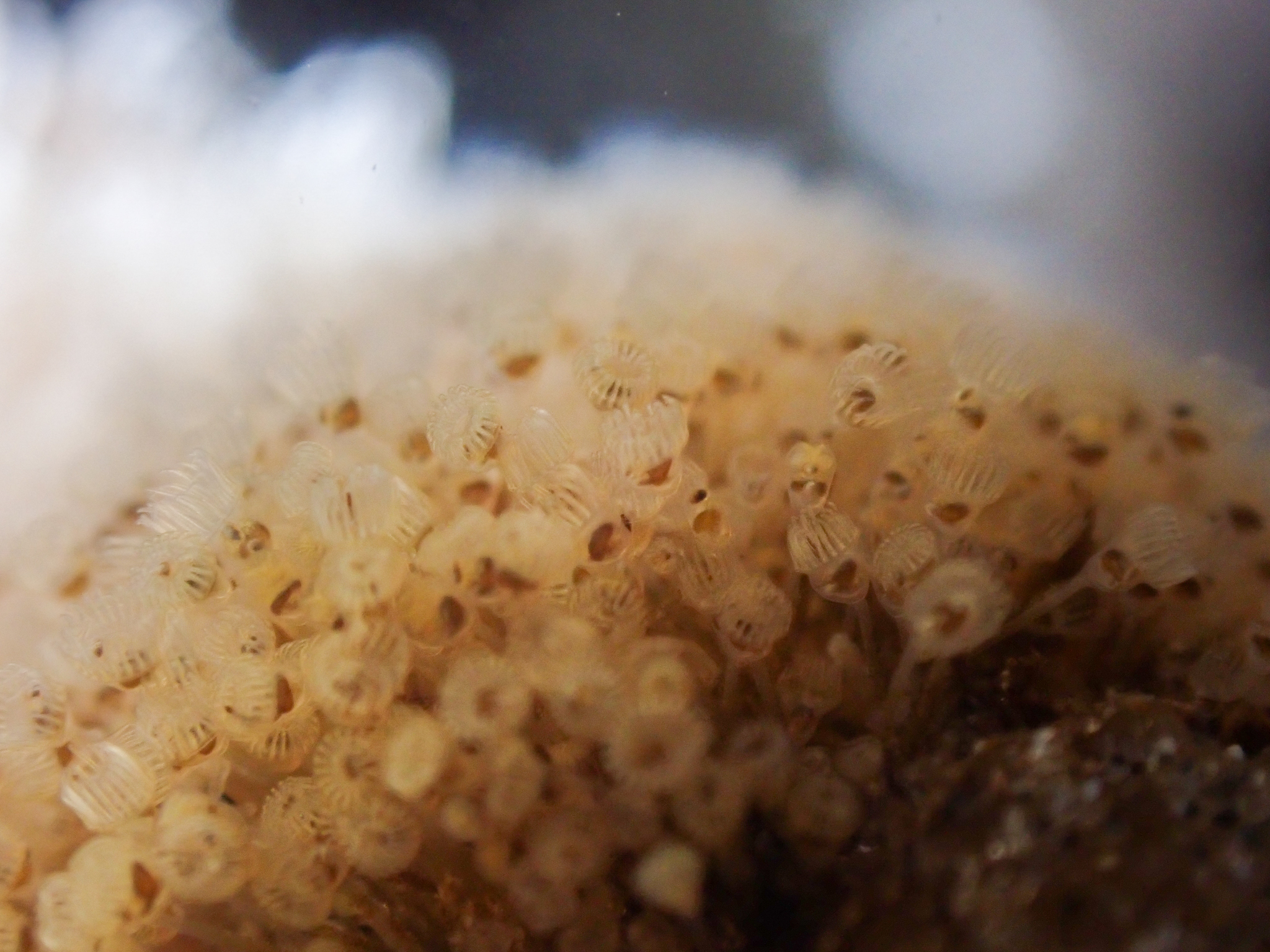

Scientific classification
- Kingdom: Animalia
- Phylum: Entoprocta
- Family: Barentsiidae
- Genus: Barentsia
- Species: B. ramosa

Binomial name
- Barentsia ramosa Robertson, 1900

Synonyms
- Gonypodaria ramosa Robertson, 1900

= Barentsia ramosa =

Species of Entoproct

Barentsia ramosa is a species of entoproct found throughout the North Atlantic and Pacific oceans. They are colonial organisms found in depths of up to 70 m that primarily feed on phytoplankton filtered out of the water.

Their central calyx holds both the mouth and anus, as well as the gonads, and, in the females, the brood chamber. They reproduce sexually, with reproductive maturity peaking in the colony in the winter. The males develop faster than the females.

== Physical description ==
Barentsia ramosa zooids range from 3 to 30 mm tall, with 1–10 branches off the base stalk, each terminating in a calyx ringed by 16–22 cilia, or tentacles. These zooids are interconnected at the base through a network of horizontal stolons, forming small colonies anchored to bare rock or to other animals.
