= Charles Hovey =

Charles Hovey may refer to:

- Charles Edward Hovey (1827–1897), educator, college president and general in the U.S. Army
- Charles Fox Hovey (1807–1859), businessman in Boston, Massachusetts
- Charles Mason Hovey (1810–1887), American nurseryman, seed merchant, journalist and author
- Charles Hovey (naval officer) (1885–1911), U.S. Navy officer and manual writer
