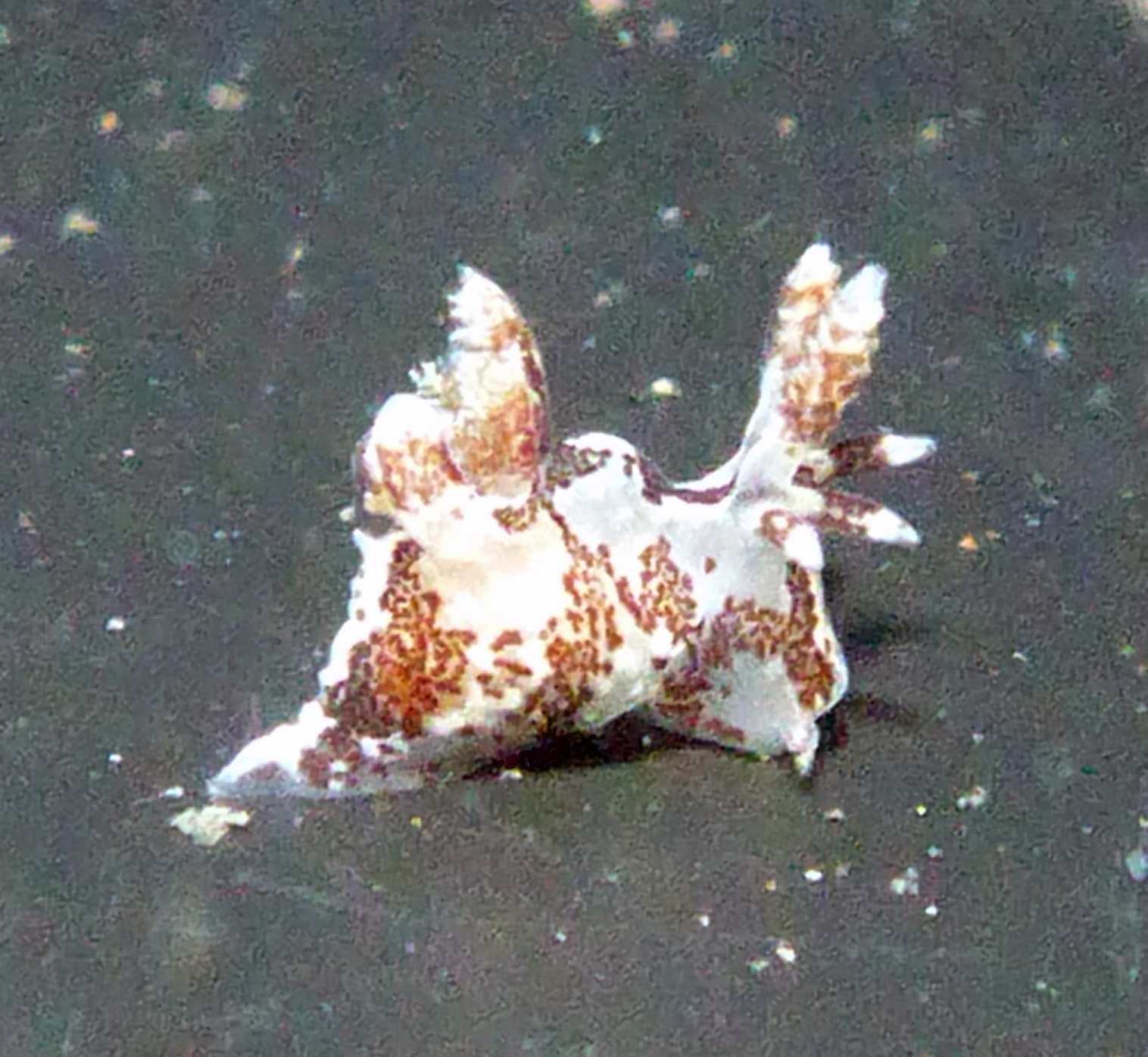
- Ancula lentiginosa from Santa Cruz, California

Scientific classification
- Kingdom: Animalia
- Phylum: Mollusca
- Class: Gastropoda
- Order: Nudibranchia
- Family: Goniodorididae
- Genus: Ancula
- Species: A. lentiginosa

Binomial name
- Ancula lentiginosa Farmer & Sloan, 1964

= Ancula lentiginosa =

Species of gastropod

Ancula lentiginosa is a species of sea slug, a dorid nudibranch, a marine gastropod mollusc in the family Goniodorididae.

== Distribution ==
This species was first described from La Jolla, California.

== Description ==
This goniodorid nudibranch is translucent white in colour with brown patches or stripes composed of small brown spots interspersed with white pigment. The pre-rhinophoral papillae, rhinophore clubs and gills are similarly mottled with brown and there is a line of brown spots along the ridge of the tail. There are two extra-branchial papillae which are translucent white with a band of brown spots below the tip.

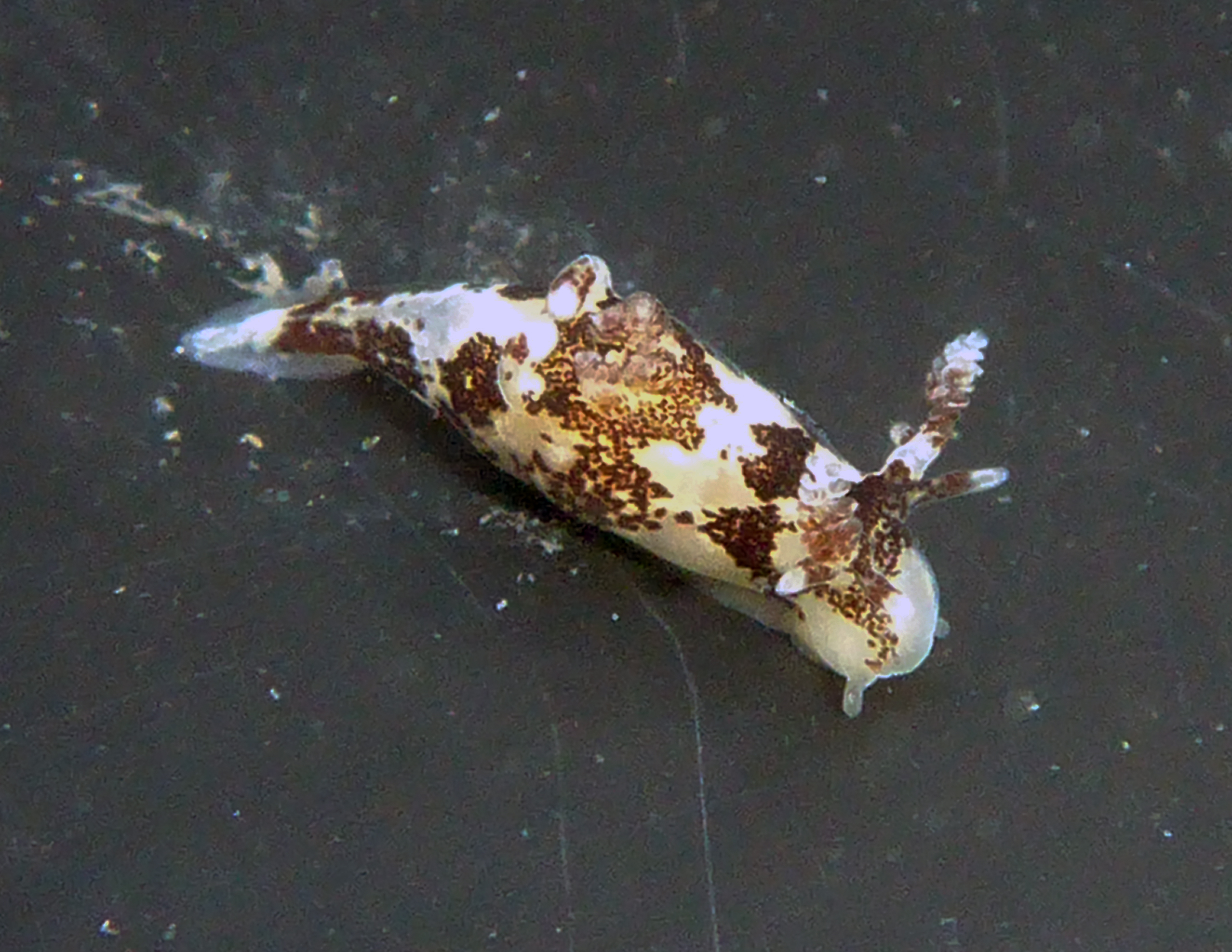
Ancula lentiginosa from Morro Bay, California

== Ecology ==
Ancula lentiginosa feeds on Barentsia sp., Entoprocta which often grow on hydroids, bryozoa and other living substrata.
