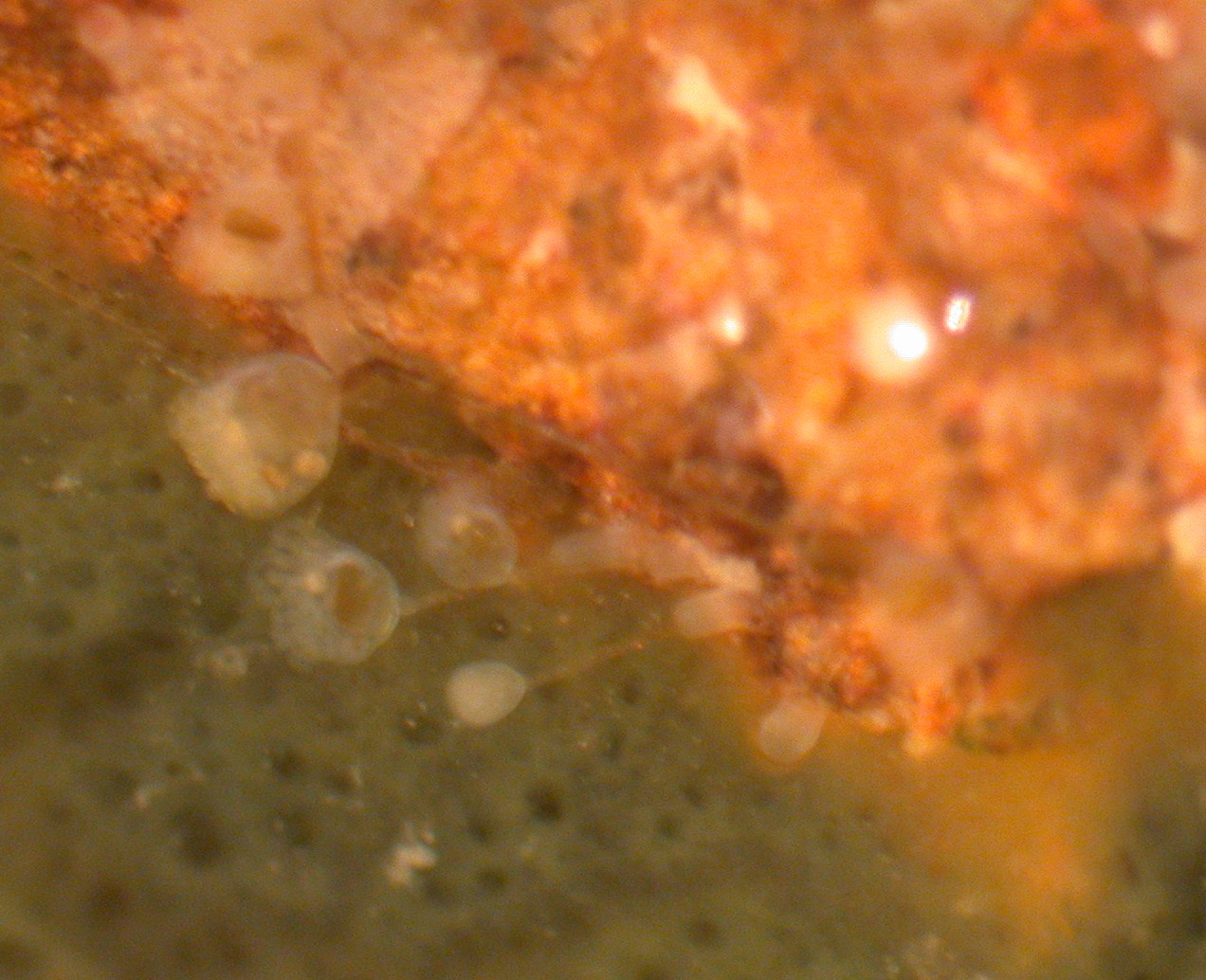

Scientific classification
- Kingdom: Animalia
- Phylum: Entoprocta
- Family: Barentsiidae
- Genus: Barentsia
- Species: B. discreta

Binomial name
- Barentsia discreta (Busk, 1886)

Synonyms
- Ascopodaria discreta Busk, 1886

= Barentsia discreta =

Species of aquatic invertebrates

Barentsia discreta is a species of sessile entopronct found throughout the world's oceans at depths of up to 500m. They are colonial organisms who feed primarily on phytoplankton they filter out of the water column. These colonies have been noted to attach themselves to a wide variety of organic and inorganic matter.

Like all Barentsia species, discreta are a mat of individual zooids connected by a network of horizontal stolons, which in discreta's case are divided into fertile and sterile sections. The zooids grow only from the fertile sections of stolon. Each zooid is composed of a head, or calyx, housing the mouth, anus, and gonads, and all other internal organs, connected to a thin stalk. It is capable of regeneration, both in the calyx itself, but also of entire zooids.

== Description ==
Each Barentsia discreta zooid ranges from 1-6mm tall, with a dark coloured stolon and around 20 tentacles ringing their calyx opening. They appear at a density of around 40 per square centimeter in a colony. Their larvae are small and dark, with a prominent foot.

At the base of the calyx there is a stack of 8-12 star cells wrapped in a cuticle and topped with muscular hemisphere. This is known as the star cell complex, this serves as the motor for the zooid's circulatory system, circulating hemocoelic fluid through the zooid and back into the stolon network with the hemisphere acting as a sort of atrium, and the stack of star cells working like a ventricle.

Their musculature is confined to the base attachment point for the stalk and the calyx, with the stalk having no muscles of its own.

== Habitat and distribution ==
Barentsia discreta have been found globally, with the type specimen found in Tristan da Cunha, at a depth of 200-300m. They are found in the South Pacific, Arctic, Atlantic, Mediterranean, and Indian oceans. They are found on all sorts of substrate, including rock, tube worms, and dock pilings; on exposed and protected coasts, from intertidal zones to depths of 500m.

== Reproduction ==
Barentsia discreta reproduce sexually for part of the year. This time period varies, with May–September being noted in California, while May–November has been noted in Japan. This timing is triggered by water temperature, with sexual maturity being triggered around 22 °Celsius, with peak development around 27°. Males develop first, with the first females differentiating a week or so after the males, and the ovaries reaching full development 15–18 days after first male differentiation. The sperm of the males triggers most of the female differentiation, though a few solitary females do so without external influence.

Unusually for Barentsia species, the colonies contain both male and female zooids, with the ratio between the two changing throughout the year, male dominated early on and females reaching around 23% of mature zooids by peak sexual development. They have large ovaries, containing 8-10 eggs at a time, and gestate their embryos in the dozens inside the brood chambers of female zooids, located in the calyx. Barentsia discreta are also capable of asexual reproduction, which is capable of sustaining colonies for years at a time.

Sexual differentiation in discreta seems to be environmental rather than genetic, and to occur exclusively in the gonads, rather than the zooid or calyx. Zooids can switch sex during a calyx regeneration, and occasional hermaphrodites where the gonads, split left and right have been noted, where only one of the testes develops, and the other half eventually develops into an ovary with the other female calyces.

After a period of around 10 days of sexual maturity, the calyces degenerate.
