= Ulmus 'Tortuosa' =

Elm cultivar

- Genus: Ulmus
- Cultivar: 'Tortuosa'
- Origin: Europe

The elm cultivar Ulmus 'Tortuosa' Host, the Wiggly Elm, was described by Host in Flora Austriaca (1827) as Ulmus tortuosa, from low, twisted, small-leaved trees that grew in the hilly districts of Hungary. A contemporary herbarium specimen (1833) from Central Europe labelled U. tortuosa Host appears to show small field elm-type leaves. Henry distinguished 'Tortuosa' Host from Loddiges' and Loudon's U. tortuosa, which he identified with Ulmus 'Modiolina', "l'orme tortillard" of France. Henry noted, however, that abnormal sinuous or zigzagging growth "might occur in any kind of elm", and herbarium specimens of elms labelled 'Tortuosa' range from U. minor cultivars to hybrid cultivars, some treated as synonymous with 'Modiolina' (see 'External links' below). A large-leaved U. campestris tortuosa was described by David in Revue horticole (1846), while a hybrid var. tortuosa cultivar from Louveigné, Belgium, with twisted trunk and large leaves, was described by Aigret in 1905. An U. campestris suberosa tortuosa was marketed in the 1930s by the Hesse Nursery of Weener, Germany, by its description a contorted form of corky-barked field elm.

== Description ==
The tree as described by Host was small, with trunk and branches that zig-zag. He added that it is the only elm that grows freely from cuttings.

== Cultivation ==
No specimens are known to survive, though two elms matching the description of 'Tortuosa', one a small-leaved field elm type and the other a large-leaved hybrid, are found in Edinburgh (2018). Ulmus tortuosa was marketed by Hovey's nursery of Boston, Massachusetts, from the 1850s (see 'Notable trees').

=== Putative specimens: U. minor forms ===
Two sinuous, zigzagging dwarf-elms (4 to 5 m tall) of the U. minor group stand in Calton Hill Park, Edinburgh's oldest public park, above the old Royal High School. U. minor is not native to Scotland, so these trees appear to be cultivars of the 'Tortuosa' type. Their small leaves recall the 1833 'Tortuosa' Host herbarium specimen.

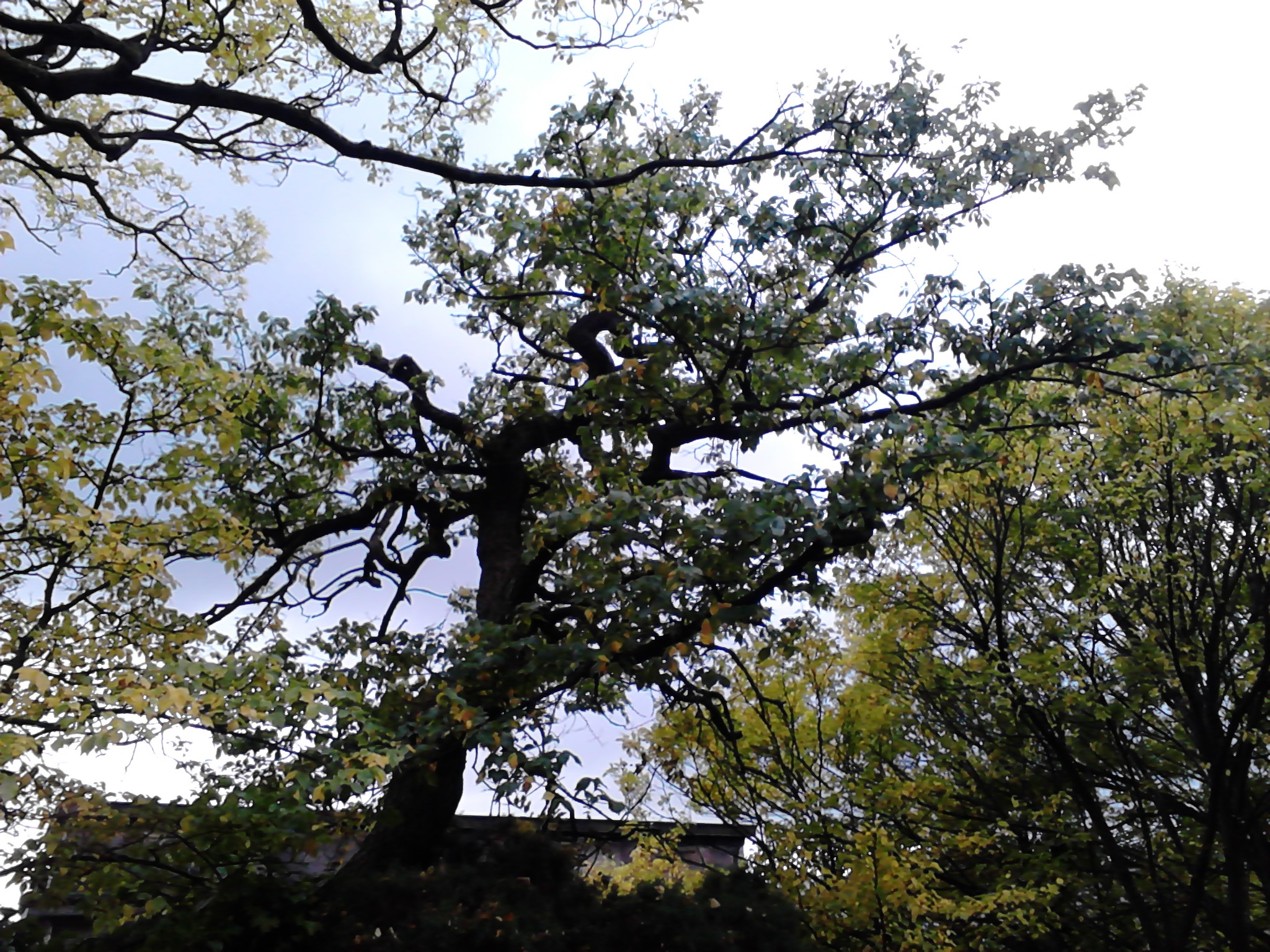
Putative 'Tortuosa' Host, Calton Hill Park, Edinburgh

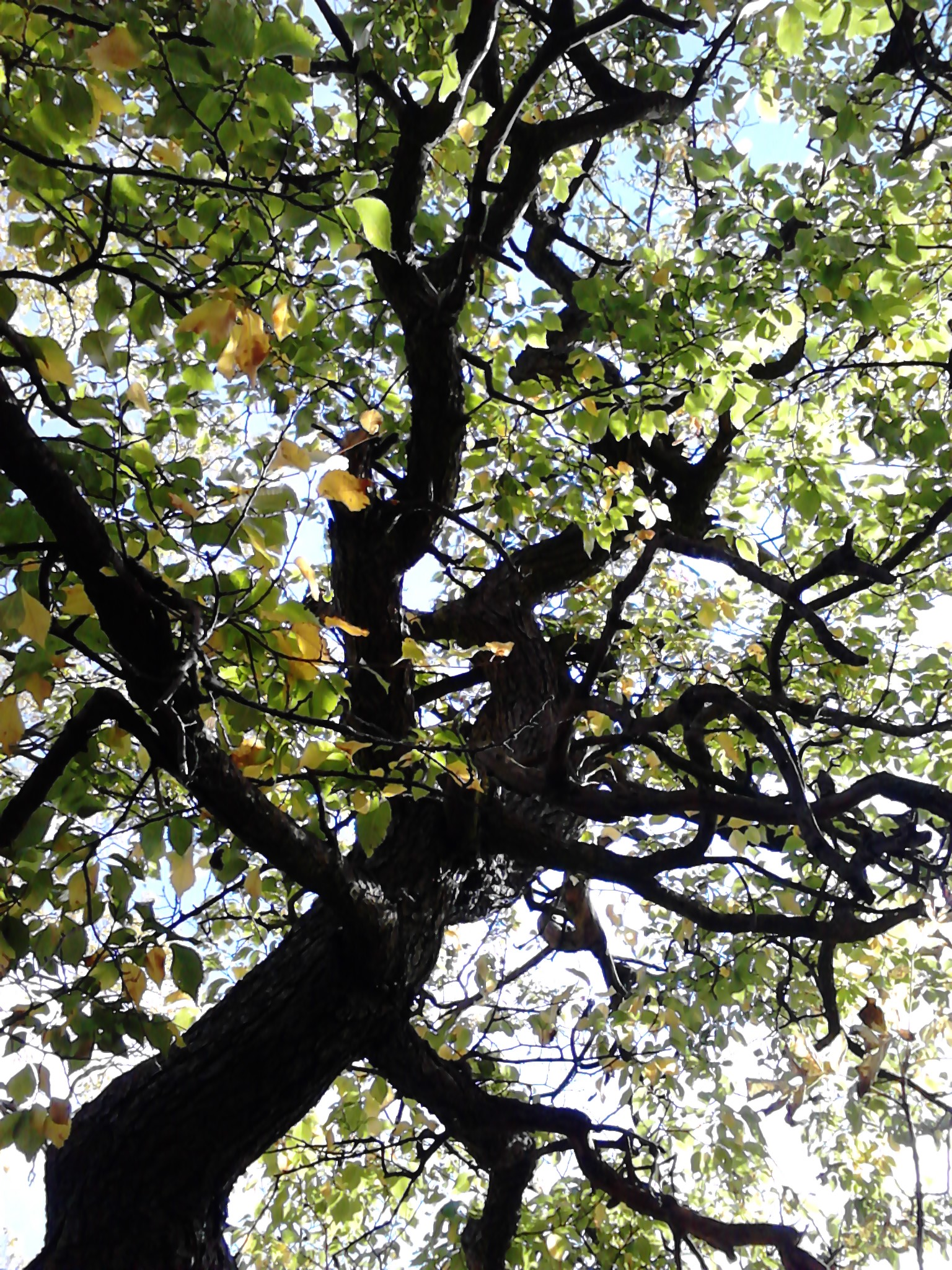
Same

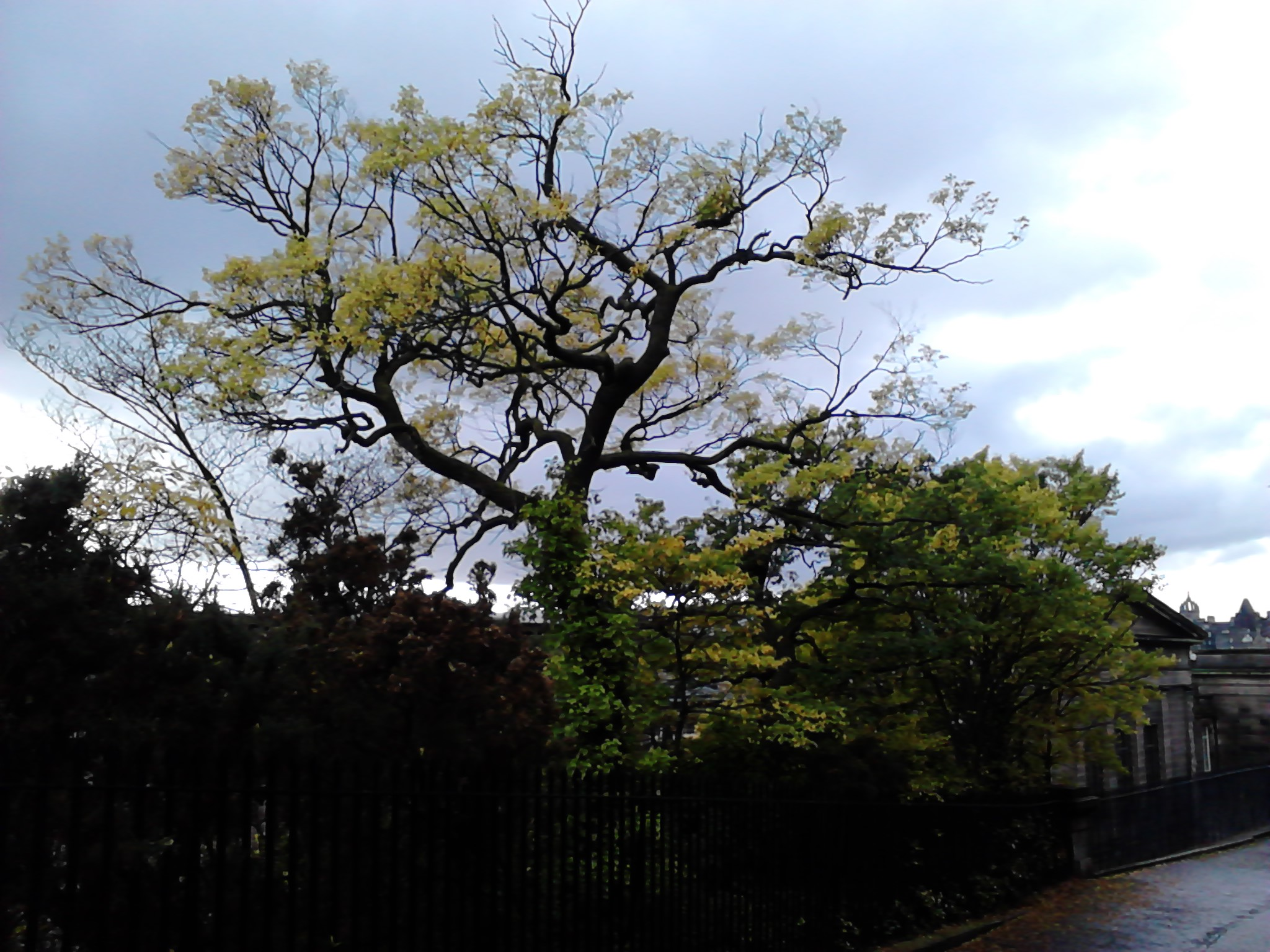
Second specimen

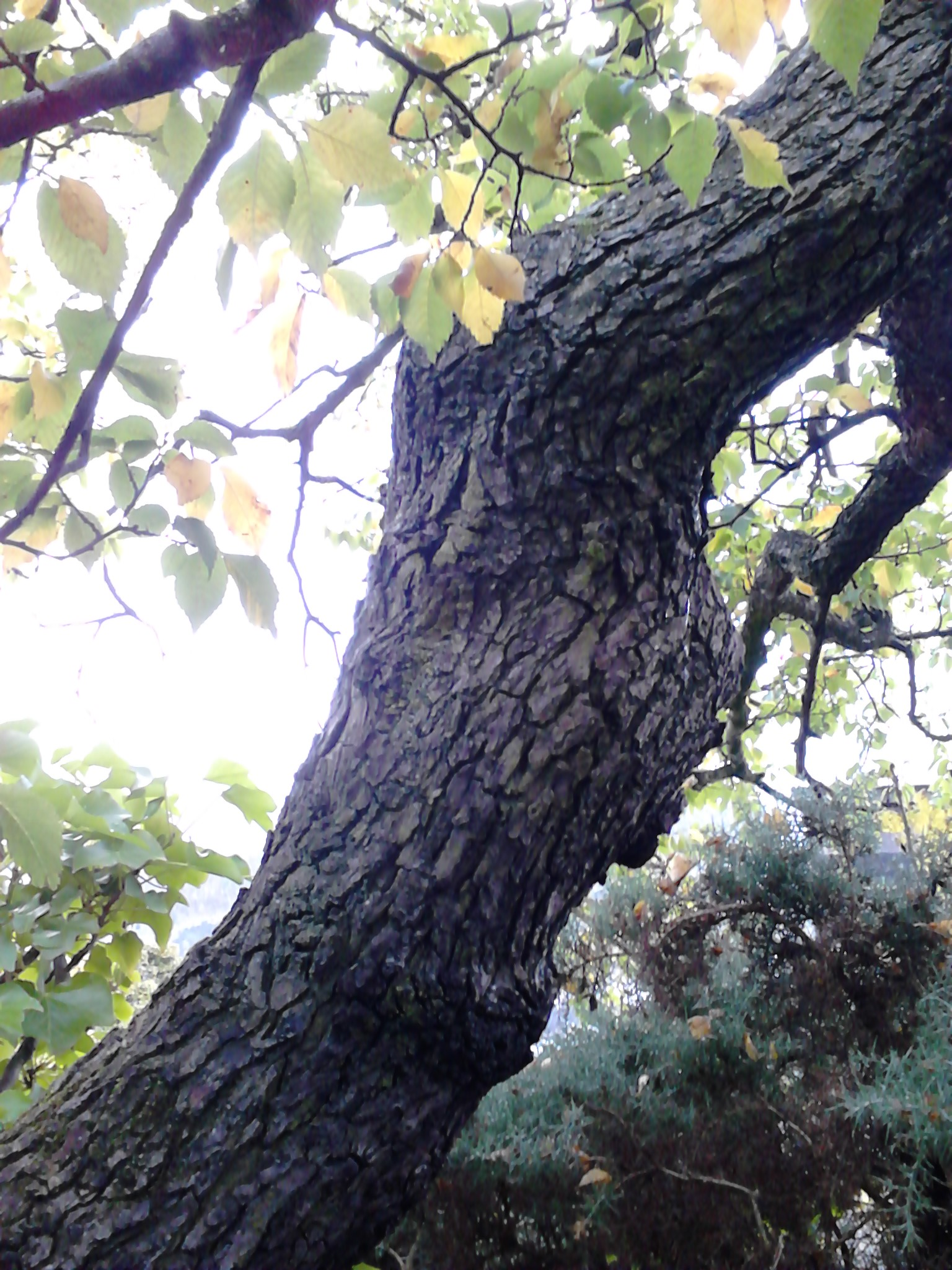
Bark of same

=== Putative specimens: U. × hollandica forms ===
A hybrid zig-zag elm, possibly a form of 'Tortuosa' or 'Modiolina', stood until 2025 beside South Trinity Rd, Edinburgh, in a position that suggested deliberate planting. (Note: The presence nearby of old U. pumila 'Pendula' above the same former railway cutting confirms that rare cultivars were planted in this location.) Ulmus campestris tortuosa appeared in the list of the local Goldenacre and Wardie nursery (Lawson Nursery group) in the late 19th century, and Ulmus tortuosa in the Lawson's of Edinburgh lists from the 1830s. A slow-growing tree (girth 1.3 m, height c.15 m), its ascending trunk zigzagged over twenty times; its branches, some pendulous, also zigzagged. The largish leaves, on slender shoots, had short petioles, giving a superficial resemblance to wych elm. The tree suckered lightly: a second identical but smaller tree stood nearby. The leaves, light suckering and samarae confirm hybrid origin, and suggest that the tree may have been identical to the U. × hollandica 'Modiolina' grown at Kew, once thought to be a wych cultivar, and the 'Modiolina' introduced to USA. Like the latter, which "produces few seeds, and in some years none at all", the Edinburgh tree was sparsely flowering, and like l'orme tortillard it had frequent 'bosses' on trunk and branches, which sprouted epicormic shoots.

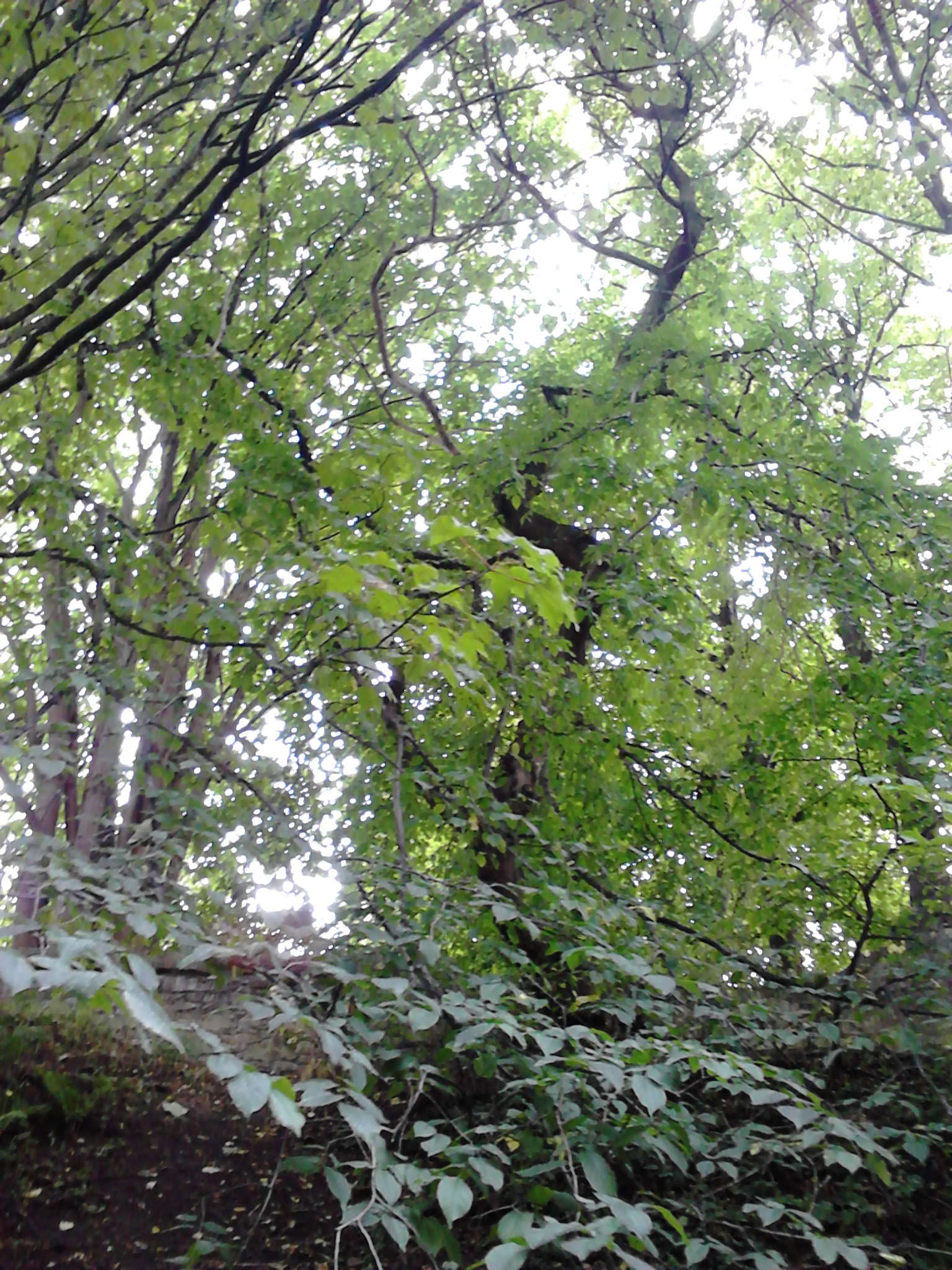
Hybrid elm of 'Tortuosa' / 'Modiolina' type, Edinburgh (2016)

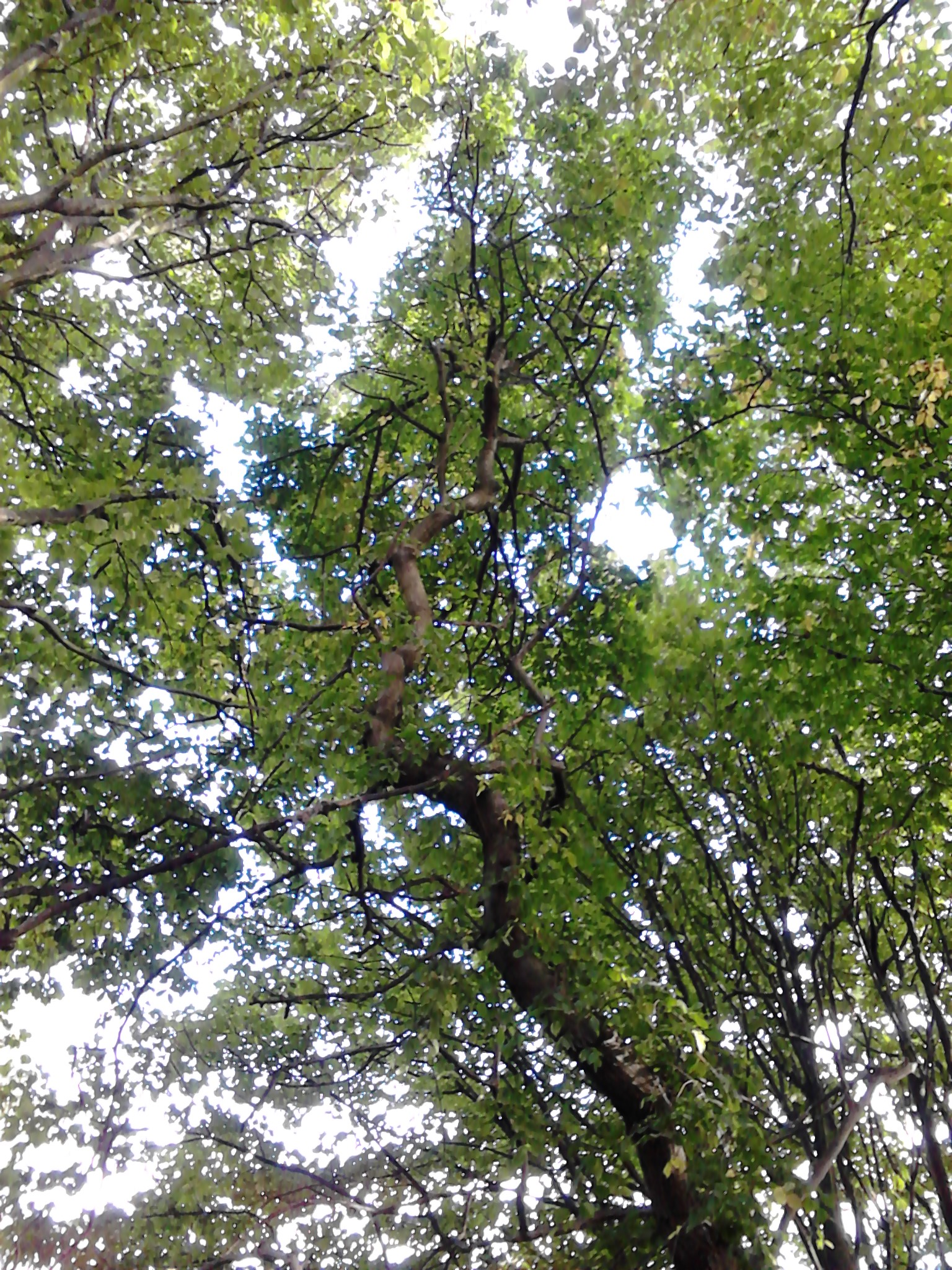
Upper section of trunk

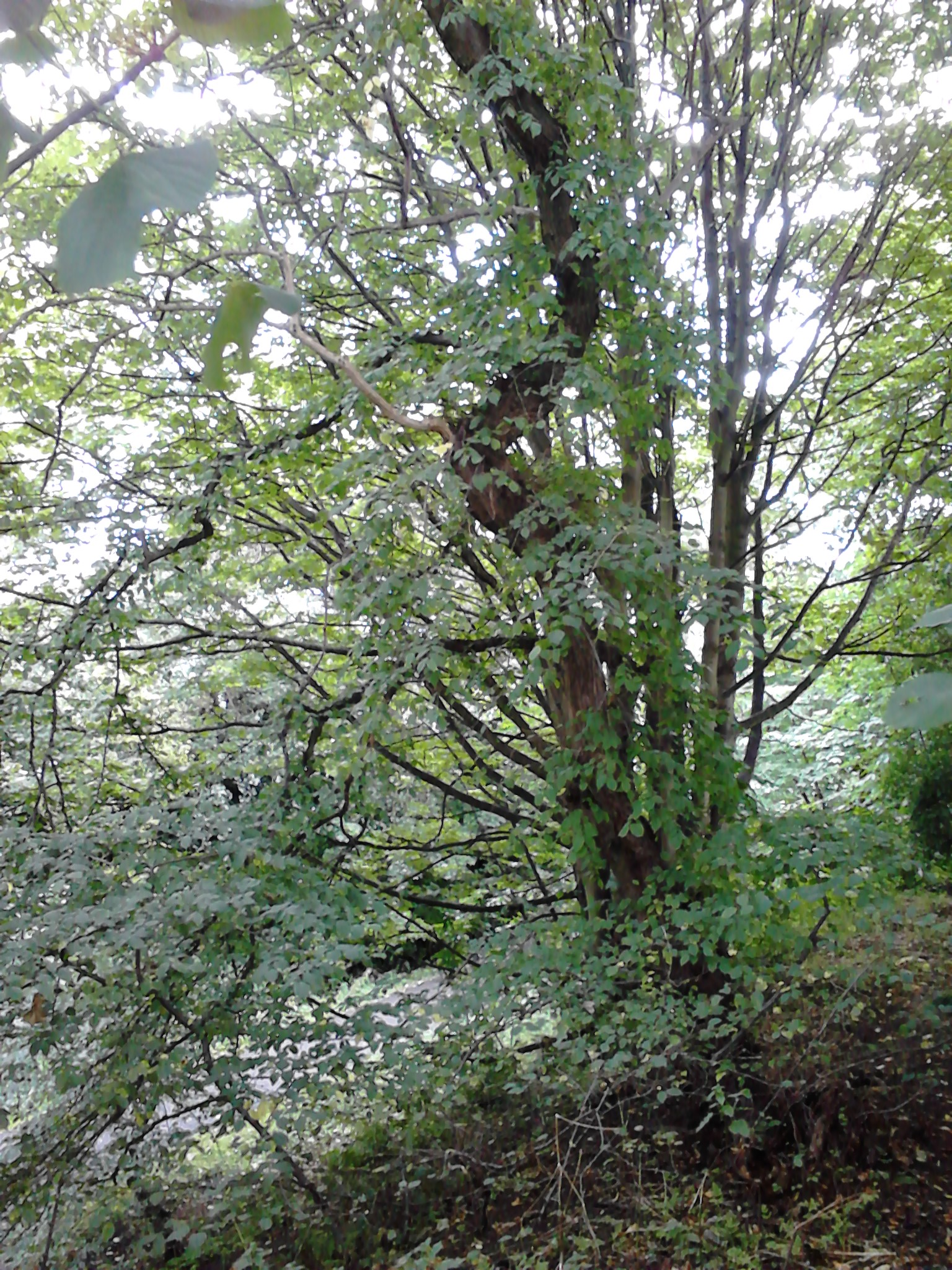
Lower section of same

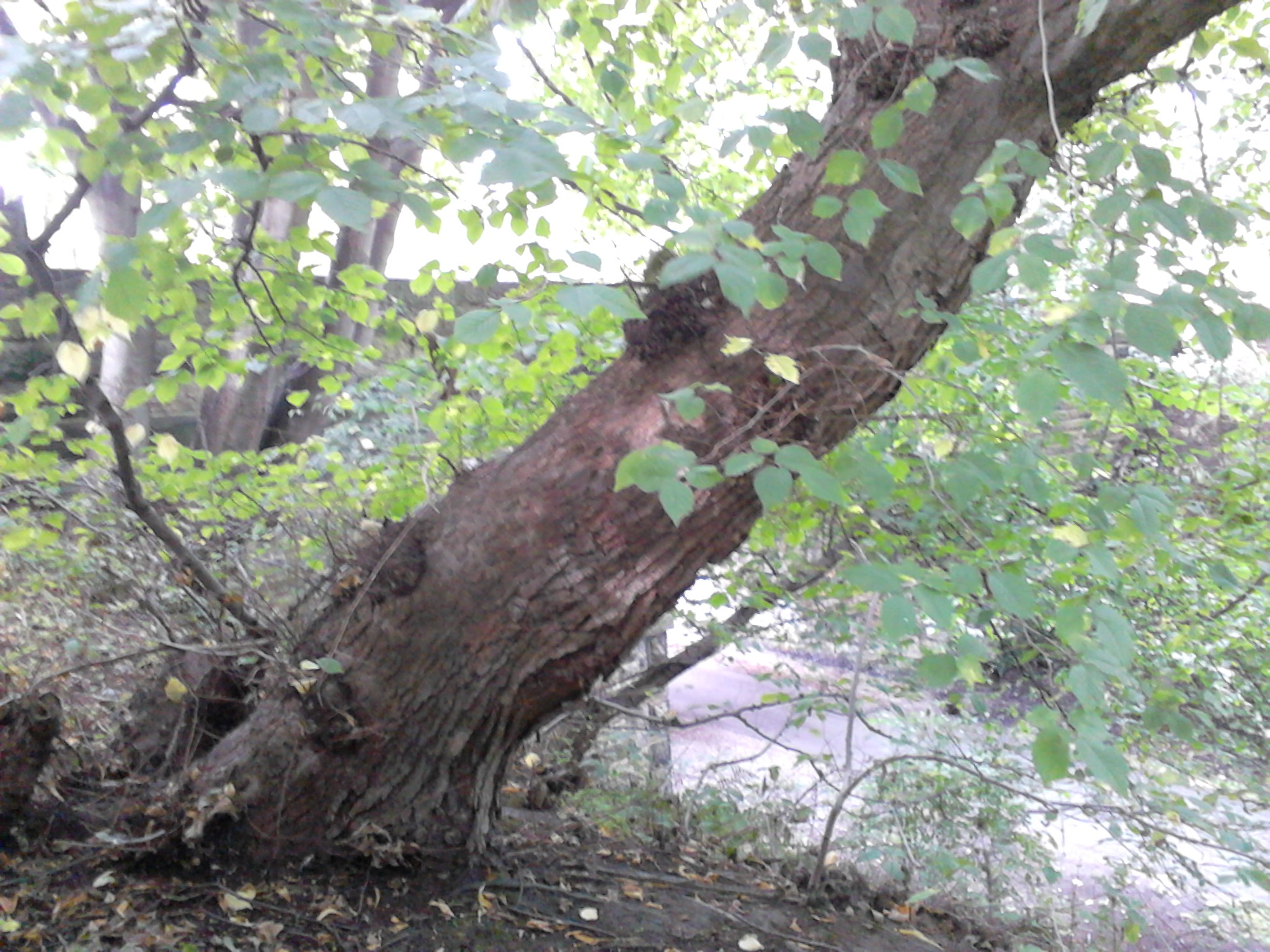
Bark

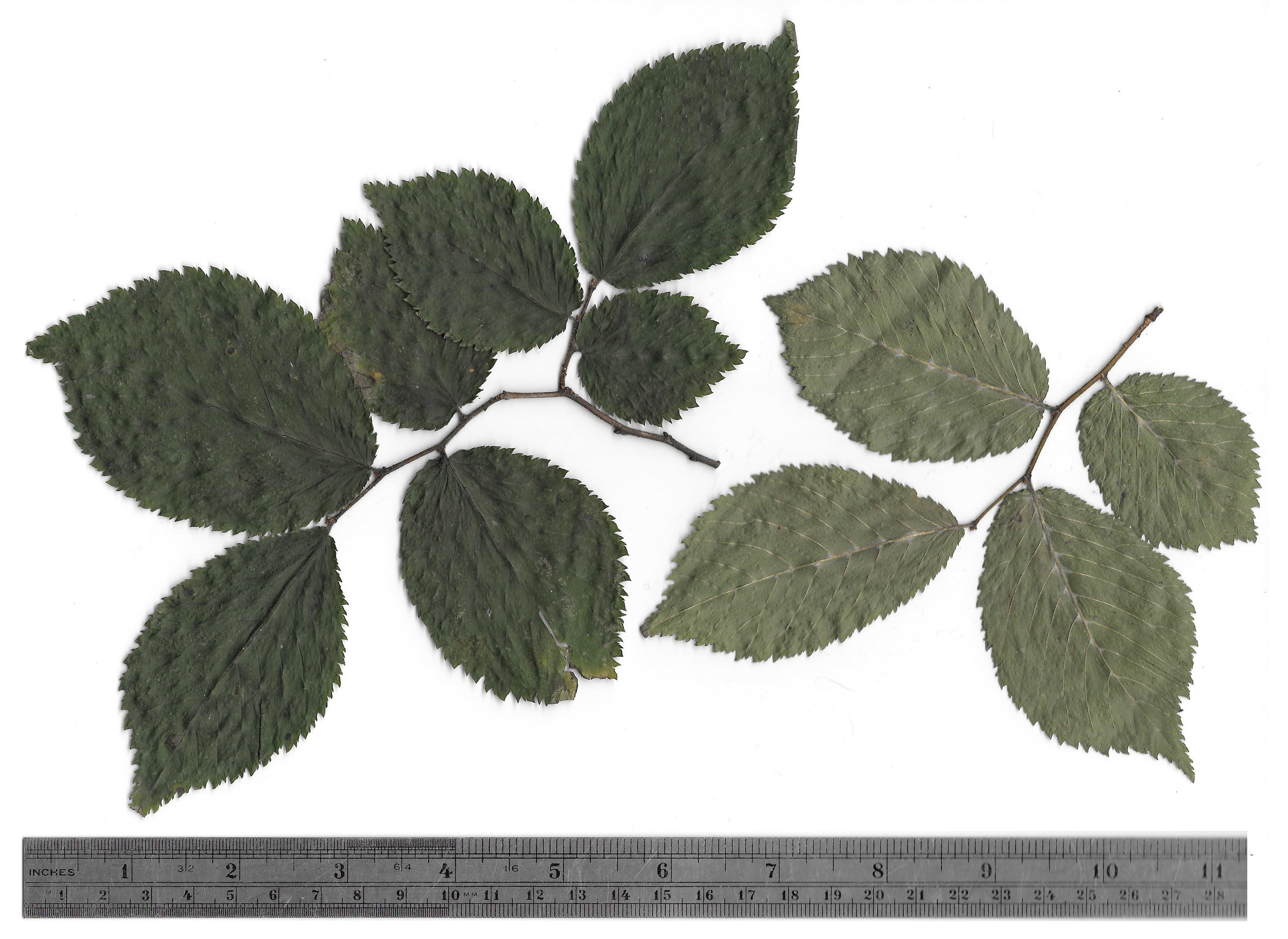
Short-shoot leaves

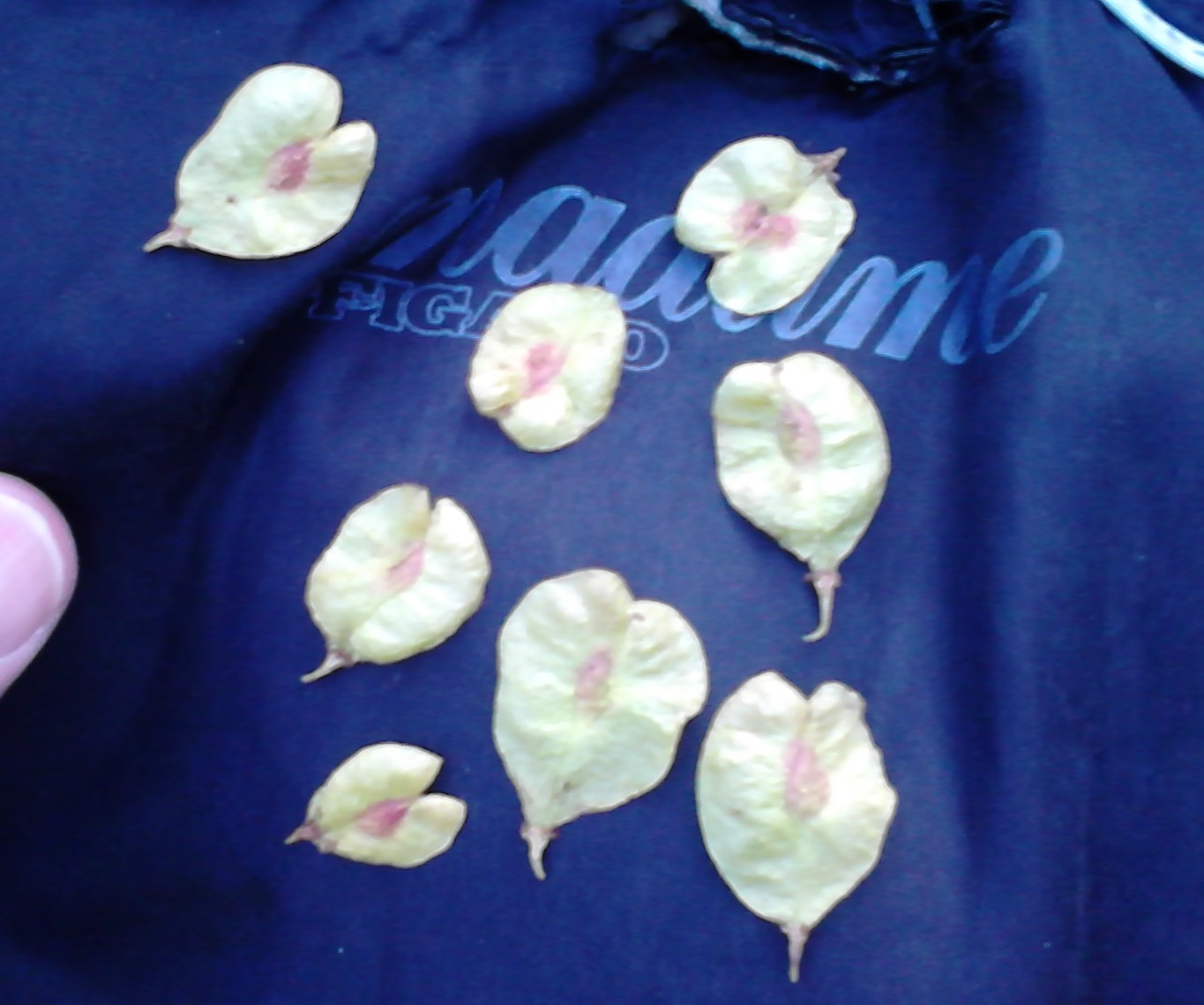
'Tortuosa' samarae, showing hybrid origin

== Notable trees ==
Charles Hovey, referring to a 'Tortuosa'-type tree in the grounds of Messrs. Hovey & Co., Boston, wrote in 1876: "An elm forming one of a long row, near our daily walk, is a never-failing source of pleasure the year round. It is what I might justly call the zig-zag, or, perhaps, serpent elm. The outline of the head, which is 60 feet (18 m) high, appears quite symmetrical; but the branches which form it run in every possible direction, like huge boa constrictors curled beneath the leaves. Yet these limbs contort and twist in a regular order of their own, and only in winter, except by close examination show their peculiar character." Hovey procured trees from England, Scotland and France in 1844.
