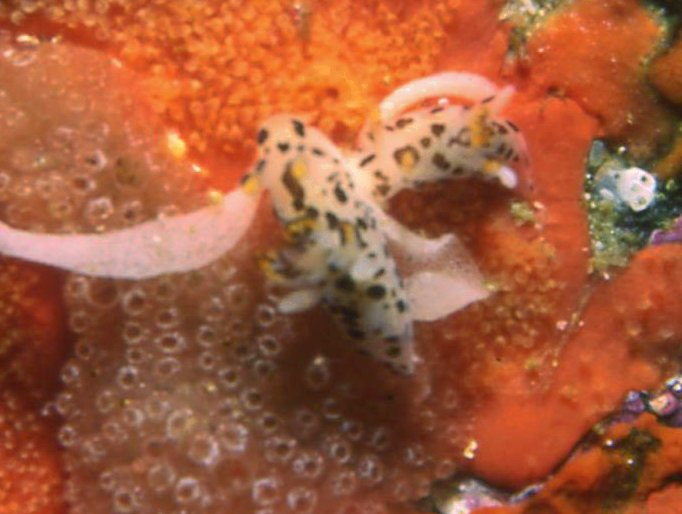
- Two giraffe spot nudibranchs with their egg ribbon

Scientific classification
- Kingdom: Animalia
- Phylum: Mollusca
- Class: Gastropoda
- Order: Nudibranchia
- Family: Goniodorididae
- Genus: Ancula; Lovén, 1846

Type species
- Ancula cristata (Alder, 1841)

Synonyms
- Drepaniella Burn, 1961 (Invalid: junior homonym of Drepaniella del Guercio, 1913 [Hemiptera]; Eucrairia is a replacement name); Eucrairia Burn, 1961 (Replacement name for Drepaniella Burn, 1961, non del Guercio, 1913); Miranda Alder & Hancock, 1847 (not available: not used as a valid name when first established)

= Ancula =

Genus of gastropods

Ancula is a genus of sea slugs, specifically dorid nudibranchs, marine gastropod molluscs in the family Goniodorididae.

== Species ==
Species within the genus Ancula include:

- Ancula espinosai Ortea, 2001
- Ancula evelinae Er. Marcus, 1961
- Ancula fuegiensis Odhner, 1926
- Ancula gibbosa (Risso, 1818) - originally described as Tritonia gibbosa Risso, 1818
- Ancula kariyana Baba, 1990
- Ancula lentiginosa Farmer & Sloan, 1964
- Ancula mapae (Burn, 1961)
- Ancula sp. Giraffe spot nudibranch

Species names which are currently considered to be synonyms:

- Ancula cristata (Alder, 1841) accepted as Ancula gibbosa (Risso, 1818)
- Ancula pacifica MacFarland, 1964 accepted as Ancula gibbosa (Risso, 1818)
- Ancula sulphurea Stimpson, 1853 accepted as Ancula gibbosa (Risso, 1818)
