= Ancula fuegiensis =

Scientific classification
- Kingdom: Animalia
- Phylum: Mollusca
- Class: Gastropoda
- Order: Nudibranchia
- Family: Goniodorididae
- Genus: Ancula
- Species: A. fuegiensis

Binomial name
- Ancula fuegiensis Odhner, 1926

Species of gastropod

Ancula fuegiensis is a species of sea slug, a dorid nudibranch, a marine gastropod mollusc in the family Goniodorididae.

== Distribution ==
This species was first described from Ushuaia, Argentina. It has also been reported from central Chile.

== Description ==
This goniodorid nudibranch is translucent white in colour with black spots. It has only two extra-branchial processes.

== Ecology ==
Ancula fuegiensis probably feeds on Entoprocta which often grow on hydroids, bryozoa and other living substrata.
