= Charles Mason Hovey =

American horticulturist

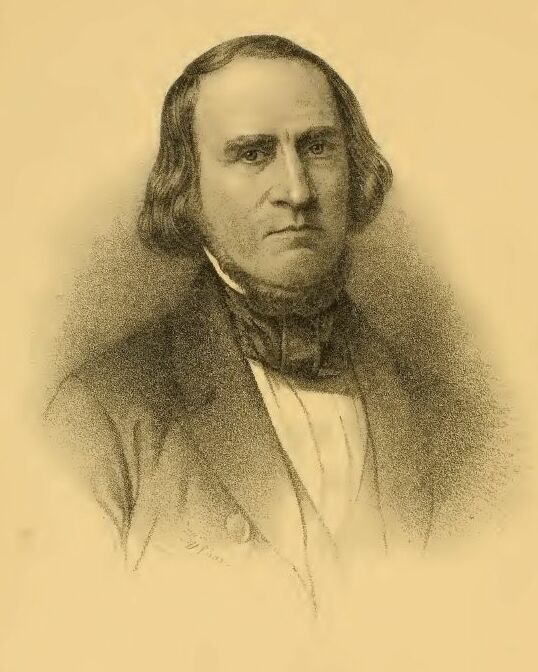
- Born: October 26, 1810; Cambridge, Massachusetts
- Died: 1887 (aged 76–77)
- Occupation: Horticultural

Signature
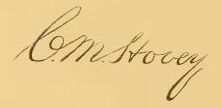

Charles Mason Hovey (October 26, 1810 - 1887) was an American nurseryman, seed merchant, journalist and author of horticultural books best known for his two-volume large quarto, The Fruits of America published between 1848 and 1856 and containing some 100 chromolithographs by William Sharp, the British-born lithographer and artist, with an extremely rare third volume which was partly published.

Hovey was an honorary member of the Royal Societies of London and of Edinburgh.

== Biography ==
Charles was the sixth of seven children born to Sarah Stone Hovey and Phineas Brown Hovey, who ran a grocery store at the comer of Main and Brookline Streets, and dealt in the sale and rental of property in Cambridge. In 1832 Hovey and his brother Phineas started Hovey & Co., a seed store and nursery in Cambridge, the nursery eventually growing to 40 acres in extent. Hovey set out to publish a magazine that would appeal to gardeners and showcase the various American fruits of interest. He became the editor of the Magazine of Horticulture published between 1835 and 1868, founded as The American Gardener's Magazine with a name change in 1837. It enjoyed a longer life than any other American horticultural journal and was modelled on John Claudius Loudon's Gardener's Magazine.

Hovey collected cultivars of pear, apple, plum and grape, also cultivating florist and ornamental plants, with a particular fondness for Camellia and Chrysanthemum. He exhibited regularly with the Massachusetts Horticultural Society and was its president for four years. He was responsible for producing the Hovey Strawberry in 1836, regarded as the foundation of the New England strawberry industry, and grown on a large scale until about 1890. Hovey wrote a seminal article "Some Remarks upon the Production of new varieties of Strawberries from Seeds" that was published July 1837 in his Magazine of Horticulture, and in which he gave detailed instructions for producing hybrids.

Hovey was a great champion of open spaces and wrote in the Magazine of Horticulture: "We need not enlarge upon the importance of public parks, certainly, if they were more numerous they would prevent the useless expenditure of money for lunatic hospitals. What the busy people of the city need is pure air, the sight of green trees, the smell of the fresh turf – extensive grounds, where they can enjoy the pleasures of the country, and find relief from the busy hours engaged in the turmoil of trade." Philadelphia nurseryman, botanist and author, Thomas Meehan, credited Hovey with the growth of American horticulture.

Today, the only visible evidence of Hovey's nursery are the names given to the short streets within the subdivisions created on parts of his land in the 1890s: Hovey, Myrtle, Magnolia and Camellia Avenues. These now compose a quiet little neighborhood of one, two and three-family homes, about a mile east of Harvard Yard, between Kirkland and Cambridge Streets, near the Cambridge/Somerville city line.

== Gallery ==
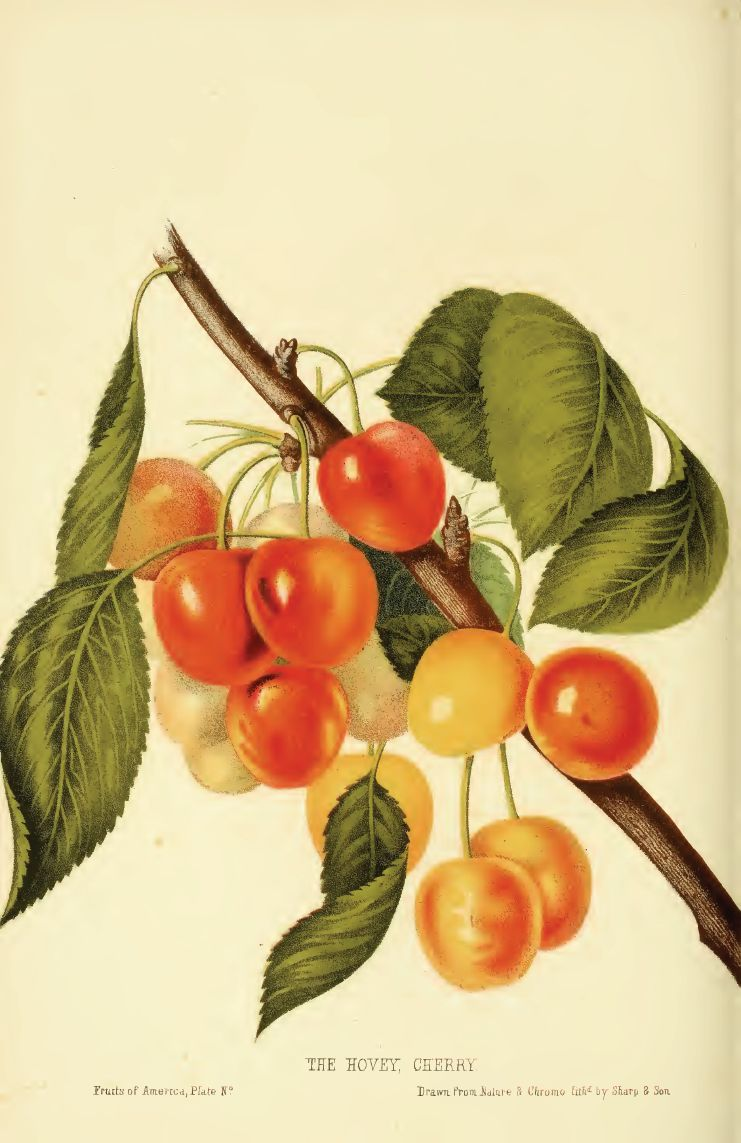
Plate by William Sharp

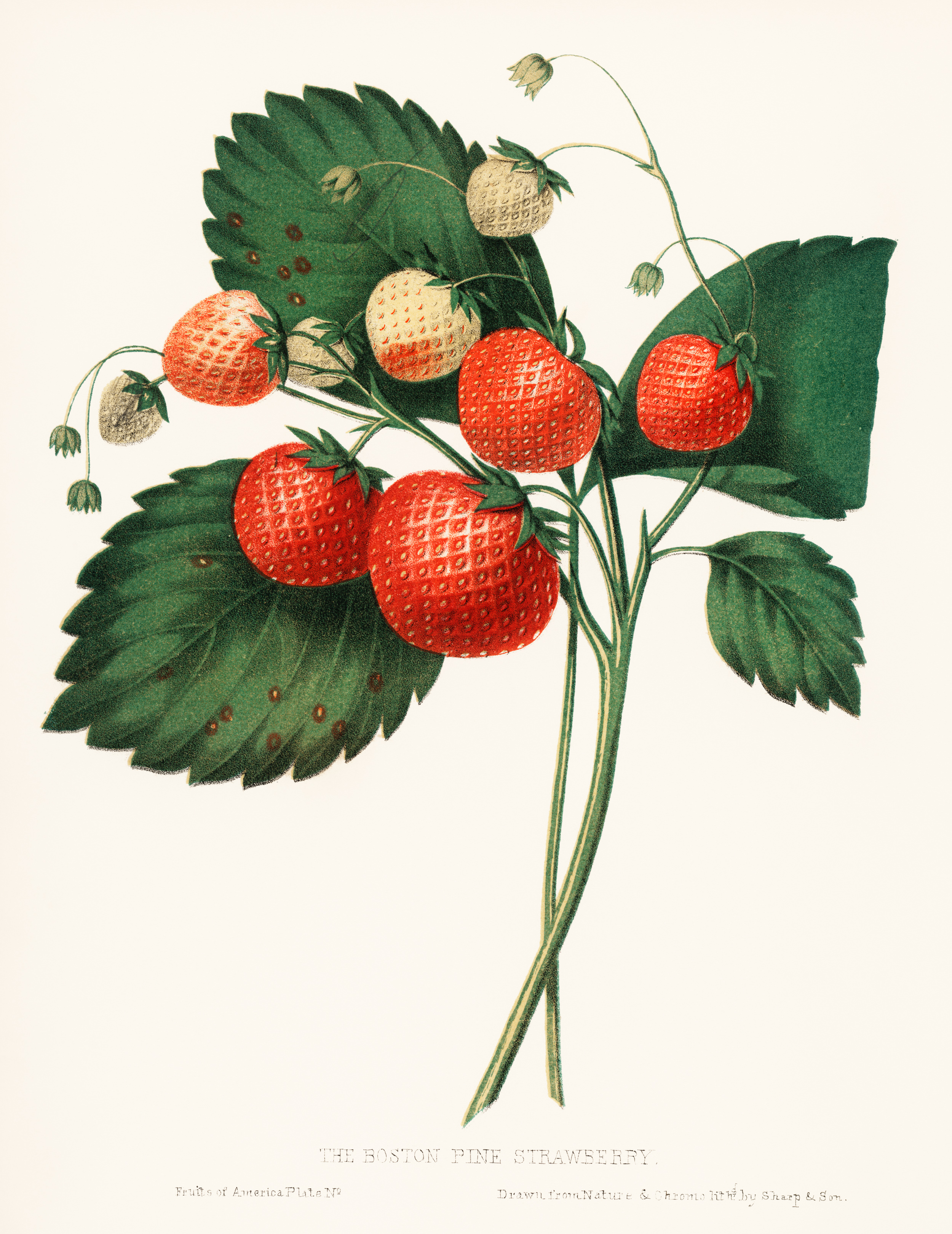
The Boston Pine Strawberry (1852)
