= Ulmus × hollandica 'Modiolina' =

Elm cultivar

- Hybrid parentage: U. glabra × U. minor
- Cultivar: 'Modiolina'
- Origin: Europe

The hybrid elm cultivar Ulmus × hollandica 'Modiolina', or Wheel-hub elm, was probably the large-leaved 'Orme tortillard' first described by Duhamel in De l'exploitation des bois (1764). Poederlé (1774) identified the tree as the 'orme maigre' growing in the region that later became part of Belgium. Dumont de Courset described a small-leaved U. campestris var. modiolina, "l'orme tortillard" (:twisty elm) in 1802 – the first use of the name 'Modiolina'. 'L'orme Tortillard', also known as 'l'orme à moyeux' (: 'wheel-hub elm'), was considered in France to be the best elm for use by wheelwrights, its timber especially suitable for hubs of wheels. Van Houtte marketed an U. campestris modiolina (tortuosa), and Späth an U. campestris modiolina, from the late 19th century. U. campestris var. modiolina Hort was confirmed as a hybrid by Chevalier in Les Ormes de France (1942) and called U. × 'Modiolina', 'l'orme à moyeux'.

Herbarium specimens sometimes treat 'Modiolina' and 'Tortuosa' as synonymous. Browne (1851) and Elwes and Henry (1913) regarded 'Modiolina' as synonymous with Loddiges' and Loudon's U. tortuosa but not with U. tortuosa (Host). The Baudriller nursery of Angers distributed 'Modiolina' and 'Tortuosa' as separate cultivars.

== Description ==
Descriptions vary, confirming more than one 'Modiolina' clone, as Chevalier pointed out (1942). Duhamel's 'Tortillard' (1764) was a knotty elm with many 'bosses' and with largish leaves. Dumont de Courset's 'Modiolina' (1802) was said to have a pyramidal form, crowded and twisted branches, and small leaves. Browne's (1851) 'Modiolina' (1851) produced few seeds, and in some years none at all. Chevalier's hybrid 'Modiolina' (1942), which he equated with the U. campestris modiolina of the nurseries, was said to resemble English Elm in form, 20–25 m (66–82 ft) in height, and to have doubly serrate smooth leaves of a dull green measuring up to 11 cm (4.3 in) × 6 cm (2.4 in) wide with a petiole of 5–6 mm (0.20–0.24 in). Specimens obtained by Swingle in France and sent to the United States in 1898 were described as having "large" leaves.

== Pests and diseases ==
'Modiolina' is not known to have any resistance to Dutch elm disease.

== Etymology ==
'Modiolina' comes from the Latin modiolus, the nave of a wheel (see Cultivation).

== Cultivation ==
Duhamel reported that "l'orme Tortillard" 'has the most useful wood of all the elms', adding that it is 'easily raised from seed, grafts, or layers'. 'Modiolina' was once particularly abundant along the road from Paris to Meaux. A single, century-old specimen stood in the Allée des Ormes [:elm avenue] in the Jardin des plantes, Paris, in the mid-20th century. Ulmus modiolina, the 'twisted or tortillard elm', was marketed by Prince's nursery of Flushing, New York from the 1820s. Specimens of "large-leaved" 'Modiolina' obtained by Swingle in France were sent to the United States in 1898. A 'Modiolina' grown at Kew and for a time labelled as a wych elm cultivar was identified as Ulmus × hollandica by Ronald Melville. One tree was planted in 1899 at the Dominion Arboretum, Ottawa, Canada. A specimen of U. campestris modiolina, obtained from Späth before 1914 and planted in 1916, stood in the Ryston Hall arboretum, Norfolk, in the early 20th century. Ulmus hollandica modiolina was present in The Hague in the 1930s.

No specimens are known to survive. For the putative 'Modiolina' in Edinburgh (2018), see 'Tortuosa'.
