= Ancula pacifica =

Scientific classification
- Kingdom: Animalia
- Phylum: Mollusca
- Class: Gastropoda
- Order: Nudibranchia
- Family: Goniodorididae
- Genus: Ancula
- Species: A. pacifica

Binomial name
- Ancula pacifica MacFarland, 1905

Synonyms
- ? Ancula gibbosa Risso, 1818

Species of gastropod

Ancula pacifica is a species of sea slugs, a dorid nudibranch, a marine gastropod mollusc in the family Goniodorididae.

== Distribution ==
This species was first described from Monterey Bay, California.

== Description ==
This goniodorid nudibranch is translucent white in color with orange lines on the body. There is a mid dorsal line and lines along the pallial margin, which may be continuous or interrupted. The pre-rhinophoral papillae and gills are tipped with orange and there is a line of orange pigment along the ridge of the tail. There are 4-14 club-shaped extra-branchial papillae which are translucent white with orange or yellow tips. Small papillae with orange tips typically occur between larger papillae with pale yellow tips. Individuals without the lines on the body occur in some populations. Although currently considered to be a synonym of the European species Ancula gibbosa there are significant differences in color and shape of the extra-branchial papillae and this is probably a distinct species.

== Ecology ==
Ancula pacifica probably feeds on Entoprocta which often grow on hydroids, bryozoa and other living substrata.
