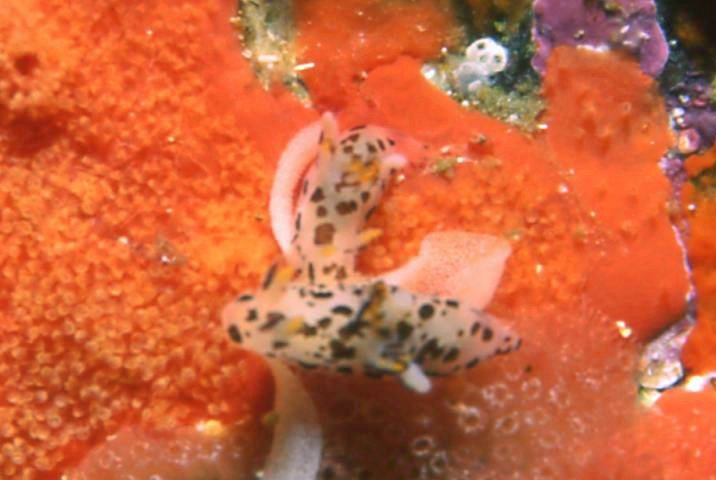

Scientific classification
- Domain: Eukaryota
- Kingdom: Animalia
- Phylum: Mollusca
- Class: Gastropoda
- Order: Nudibranchia
- Superfamily: Onchidoridoidea
- Family: Goniodorididae
- Genus: Ancula
- Species: A. sp.

Binomial name
- Ancula sp.

= Giraffe spot nudibranch =

Species of gastropod

The giraffe spot nudibranch, Ancula sp., as designated by Gosliner, 1987, is a species of colourful sea slug, specifically a dorid nudibranch, a marine gastropod mollusc in the family Goniodorididae. As of November 2009, it remained undescribed by science.

== Distribution ==
This species is endemic to the South African coast and is found from the Atlantic coast of the Cape Peninsula to the eastern shore of False Bay in less than 15 m.

== Description ==
The giraffe spot nudibranch is a small (up to 20 mm) white-bodied nudibranch covered with regular brown patches and large annulate rhinophores. Its gills are yellow and brown with paired projections alongside them. Its head has several pale projections.

== Ecology ==
The giraffe spot nudibranch feeds on arborescent bryozoans. Its egg mass is a wavy white ribbon.
