= Ancula evelinae =

Scientific classification
- Kingdom: Animalia
- Phylum: Mollusca
- Class: Gastropoda
- Order: Nudibranchia
- Family: Goniodorididae
- Genus: Ancula
- Species: A. evelinae

Binomial name
- Ancula evelinae Er. Marcus, 1961

Species of gastropod

Ancula evelinae is a species of sea slug, a dorid nudibranch, a marine gastropod mollusc in the family Goniodorididae.

== Distribution ==
This species was first described from Beaufort, North Carolina.

== Description ==
This goniodorid nudibranch is translucent white with black patches. It has only two, curved, extra-branchial processes.

== Ecology ==
Ancula evelinae probably feeds on Entoprocta which often grows on hydroids, bryozoa and other living substrata.
