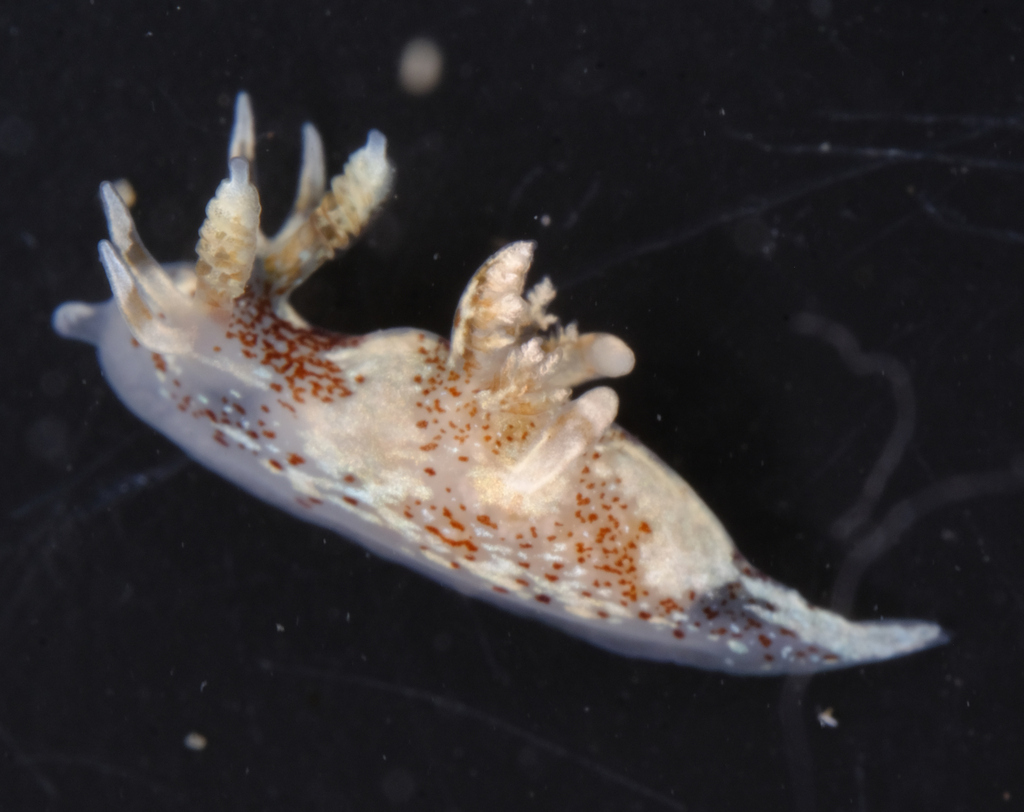

Scientific classification
- Kingdom: Animalia
- Phylum: Mollusca
- Class: Gastropoda
- Order: Nudibranchia
- Family: Goniodorididae
- Genus: Ancula
- Species: A. mapae

Binomial name
- Ancula mapae Burn, 1961

= Ancula mapae =

Species of gastropod

Ancula mapae is a species of sea slug, a dorid nudibranch, a marine gastropod mollusc in the family Goniodorididae.

== Distribution ==
This species was first described from Victoria, Australia.

== Description ==
This goniodorid nudibranch is translucent white in colour with brown patches or stripes composed of small brown spots interspersed with white pigment. The pre-rhinophoral papillae, extra-branchial papillae and tail have a band of yellow before the tip. There are two extra-branchial papillae which are strongly tapered to a point.

== Ecology ==
Ancula mapae probably feeds on Entoprocta which often grow on hydroids, bryozoa and other living substrata.
