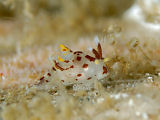

Scientific classification
- Kingdom: Animalia
- Phylum: Mollusca
- Class: Gastropoda
- Order: Nudibranchia
- Family: Goniodorididae
- Genus: Ancula
- Species: A. kariyana

Binomial name
- Ancula kariyana Baba, 1990

= Ancula kariyana =

Species of gastropod

Ancula kariyana is a species of sea slug, a dorid nudibranch, a marine gastropod mollusc in the family Goniodorididae.

== Distribution ==
This species was first described from Japan.

== Description ==
This goniodorid nudibranch is translucent white in colour with brown spots and patches. The pre-rhinophoral papillae and gills are tipped with yellow and there is a line of white pigment with diffuse edges along the ridge of the tail. The front of the rhinophores is brown and the tips are white. There are two long extra-branchial papillae which are translucent white with some yellow and brown streaks on their upper surfaces.

== Ecology ==
Ancula kariyana probably feeds on Entoprocta which often grow on hydroids, bryozoa and other living substrata.
