= Ancula espinosai =

Scientific classification
- Kingdom: Animalia
- Phylum: Mollusca
- Class: Gastropoda
- Order: Nudibranchia
- Family: Goniodorididae
- Genus: Ancula
- Species: A. espinosai

Binomial name
- Ancula espinosai Ortea, 2001

Species of gastropod

Ancula espinosai is a species of sea slug, a dorid nudibranch, a marine gastropod mollusc in the family Goniodorididae.

== Distribution ==
This species was first described from Punta Mona, Manzanillo, Limón, Costa Rica.

== Description ==
This goniodorid nudibranch is translucent white in colour with red markings.

== Ecology ==
Ancula espinosai probably feeds on Entoprocta which often grow on hydroids, bryozoa and other living substrata.
