= Urnatella =

Scientific classification
- Domain: Eukaryota
- Kingdom: Animalia
- Phylum: Entoprocta
- Family: Barentsiidae
- Genus: Urnatella; Leidy, 1851

Genus of early animals

Urnatella is a genus of primitive animals (Entoprocta) belonging to the family Barentsiidae.

The species of this genus (Urnatella gracilis Leidy, 1851) are found in America.
