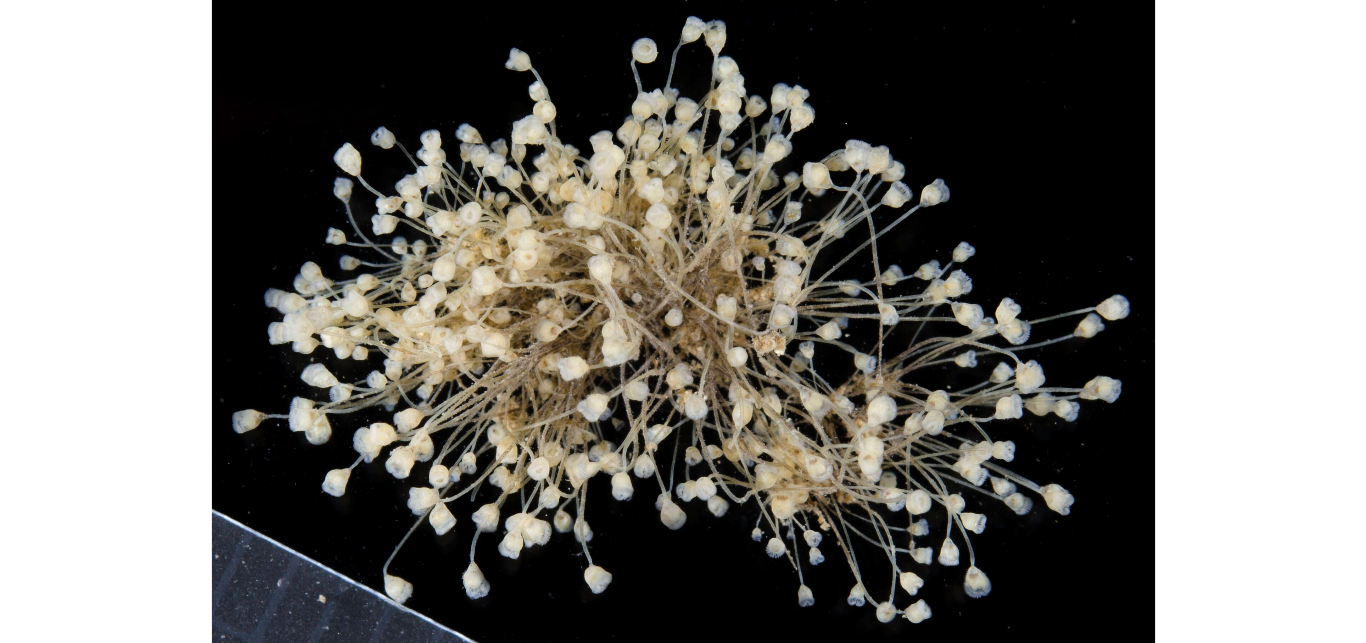
- Barentsia laxa

Scientific classification
- Kingdom: Animalia
- Phylum: Entoprocta
- Family: Barentsiidae
- Genus: Barentsia; Hincks, 1880

= Barentsia =

Genus of marine animals

Barentsia is a genus of Entoprocta belonging to the family Barentsiidae. They are sessile colonial organisms composed of many individual cup shaped "heads" at the end of long thin stalks, ringed with small cilia. Like all members of Entoprocta (lit. 'inside rectum/anus'), both their mouth and anus are found in at the end of their stalks. The genus was first described in 1880.

They feed primarily on phytoplankton and reproduce sexually between individual zooids but are also capable of asexual reproduction. Size differs between species, but individual zooid height can be up between 1 and 30mm.

== Physical description ==
Barentsia have a "crown" of 10-20 cilia, which they use to filter water towards their mouths, around their central calyx, or bulb, at the end of their thin, unbranching stalks. The cilia cannot retract, but instead fold down across the centre of the calyx. The stalks have a singular, muscular attachment at their base, which they use to "flick" themselves back and forth. The individual zooids are connected by horizontal stolons.

== Reproduction ==
Unlike most entoprocts, Barentsia mostly have distinct male and female members. Reproductive patterns vary, with species like B. hildegardae, B. conferta, and B. Ramosa exhibiting year long reproduction, though the former peaks in the summer while the later two exhibit more reproductive behaviour in the winter, B. benedini reproduces only during parts of the year, though in lab conditions have been known to reproduce year round. Males spawn into the water, and females gestate the larvae internally. Males mature faster than females.

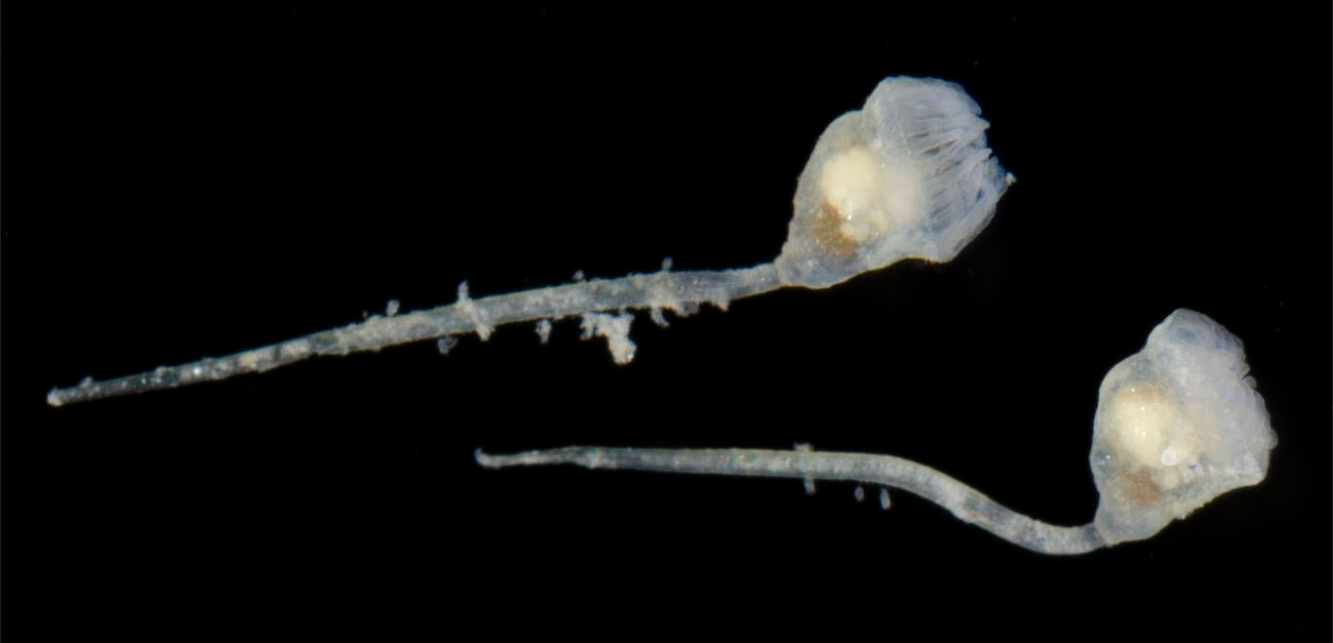
An individual zooid, showing the calyx and cilia

== Species ==
Species:

- Barentsia antarctica Johnston & Angel, 1940
- Barentsia benedeni Foettinger, 1887
- Barentsia bullata Fleming, 1826
- Barentsia capitata Calvet, 1904
- Barentsia conferta Wasson, 1997
- Barentsia discreta Busk, 1886
- Barentsia elongata Jullien & Calvin, 1903
- Barentsia gracilis Sars, 1835
- Barentsia hildegardae Wasson, 1997
- Barentsia hoizawai Toriumi, 1949
- Barentsia intermedia Johnson & Angel, 1940
- Barentsia laxa Kirkpatrick, 1890
- Barentsia macropus Ehlers, 1890
- Barentsia major Hincks, 1889
- Barentsia matsushimana Toriumi, 1951
- Barentsia mutabilis Toriumi, 1951
- Barentsia parva O'Donoghue & O'Donoghue, 1923
- Barentsia ramosa Robertson, 1900
- Barentsia robusta O'Donoghue, 1924
- Barentsia timida Verrill, 1900
- Barentsia vararticula Andersson, 1902
