= William Sharp (lithographer) =

William Sharp (1803–1875) was a British-born painter who is credited with introducing chromolithography to America in 1840.

Sharp had worked for the lithographer Charles Hullmandel in London. On his arrival in Boston in 1840, Sharp became partners with Francis Michelin, another former employee of Hullmandel.

== Image gallery ==
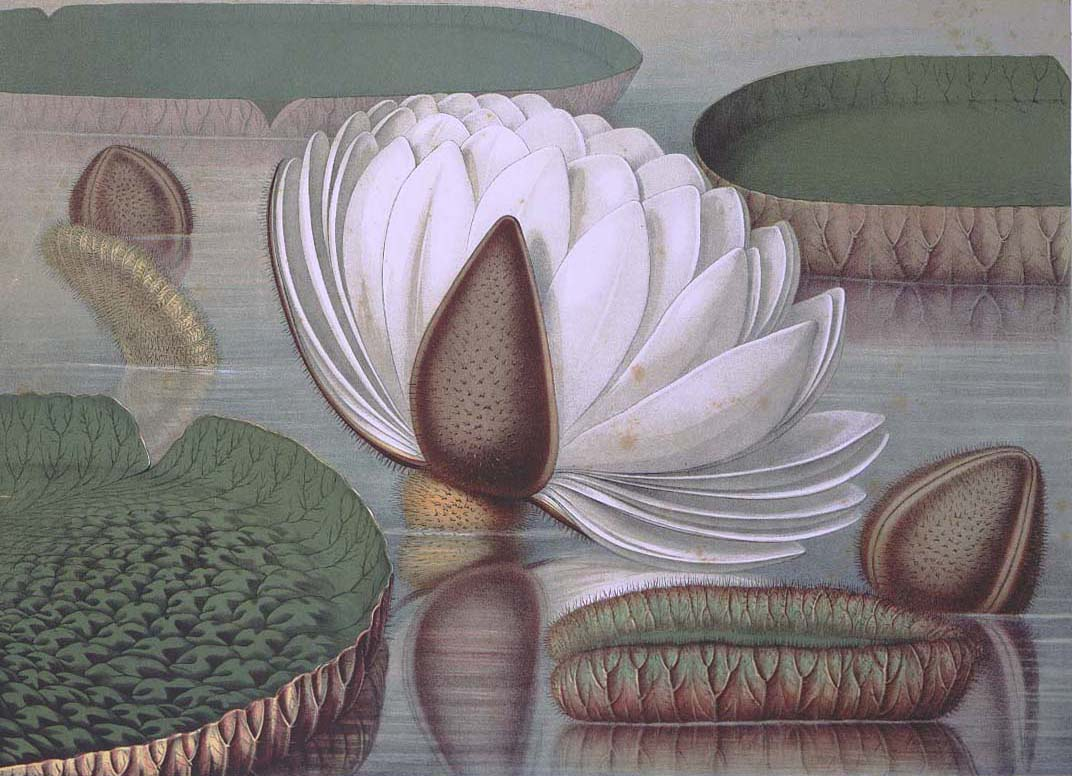
Victoria regia; chromolithograph (after John Fisk Allen)

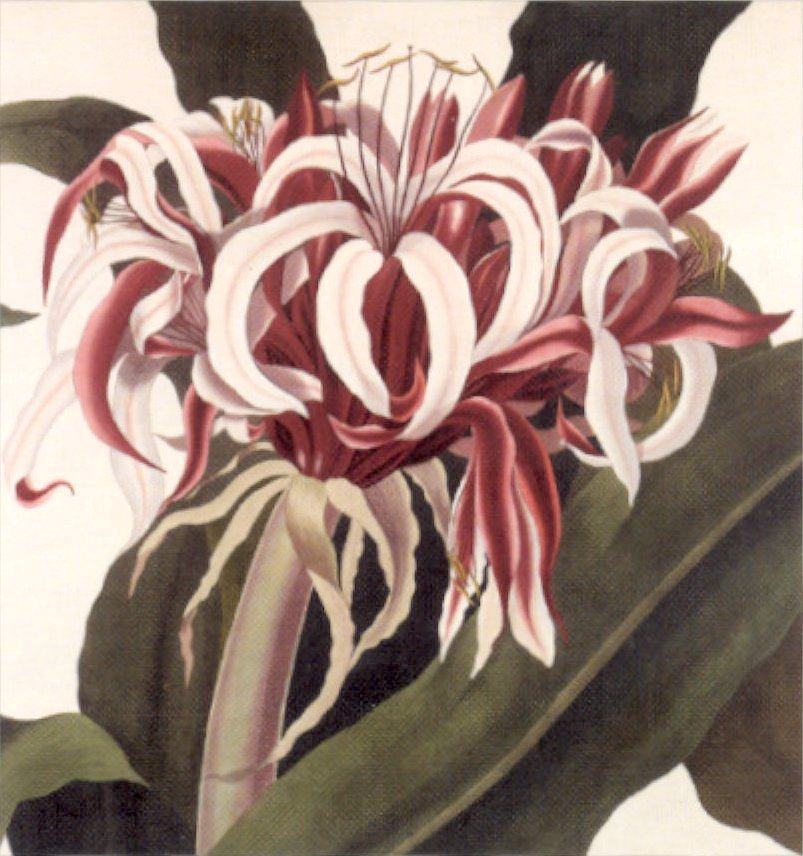
Victoria water lily

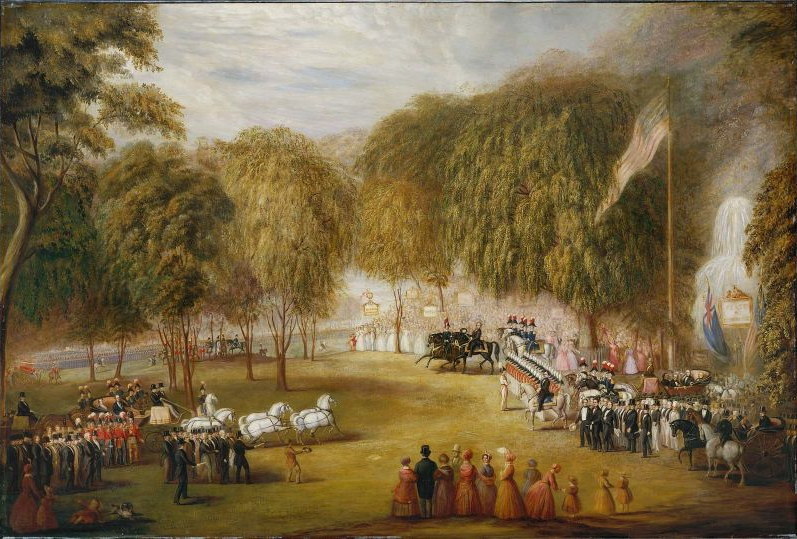
Railroad Jubilee On Boston Common, 1851
