= Chromolithography =

Method for making multi-colour prints

- Woodblock printing: 200
- Movable type: 1040
- Intaglio (printmaking): 1430
- Printing press: c. 1440
- Etching: c. 1515
- Mezzotint: 1642
- Relief printing: 1690
- Aquatint: 1772
- Lithography: 1796
- Chromolithography: 1837
- Rotary press: 1843
- Hectograph: 1860
- Offset printing: 1875
- Hot metal typesetting: 1884
- Mimeograph: 1885
- Daisy wheel printing: 1889
- Photostat and rectigraph: 1907
- Screen printing: 1911
- Spirit duplicator: 1923
- Dot matrix printing: 1925
- Xerography: 1938
- Spark printing: 1940
- Phototypesetting: 1949
- Inkjet printing: 1950
- Dye-sublimation: 1957
- Laser printing: 1969
- Thermal printing: c. 1972
- Solid ink printing: 1972
- Thermal-transfer printing: 1981
- 3D printing: 1986
- Digital printing: 1991

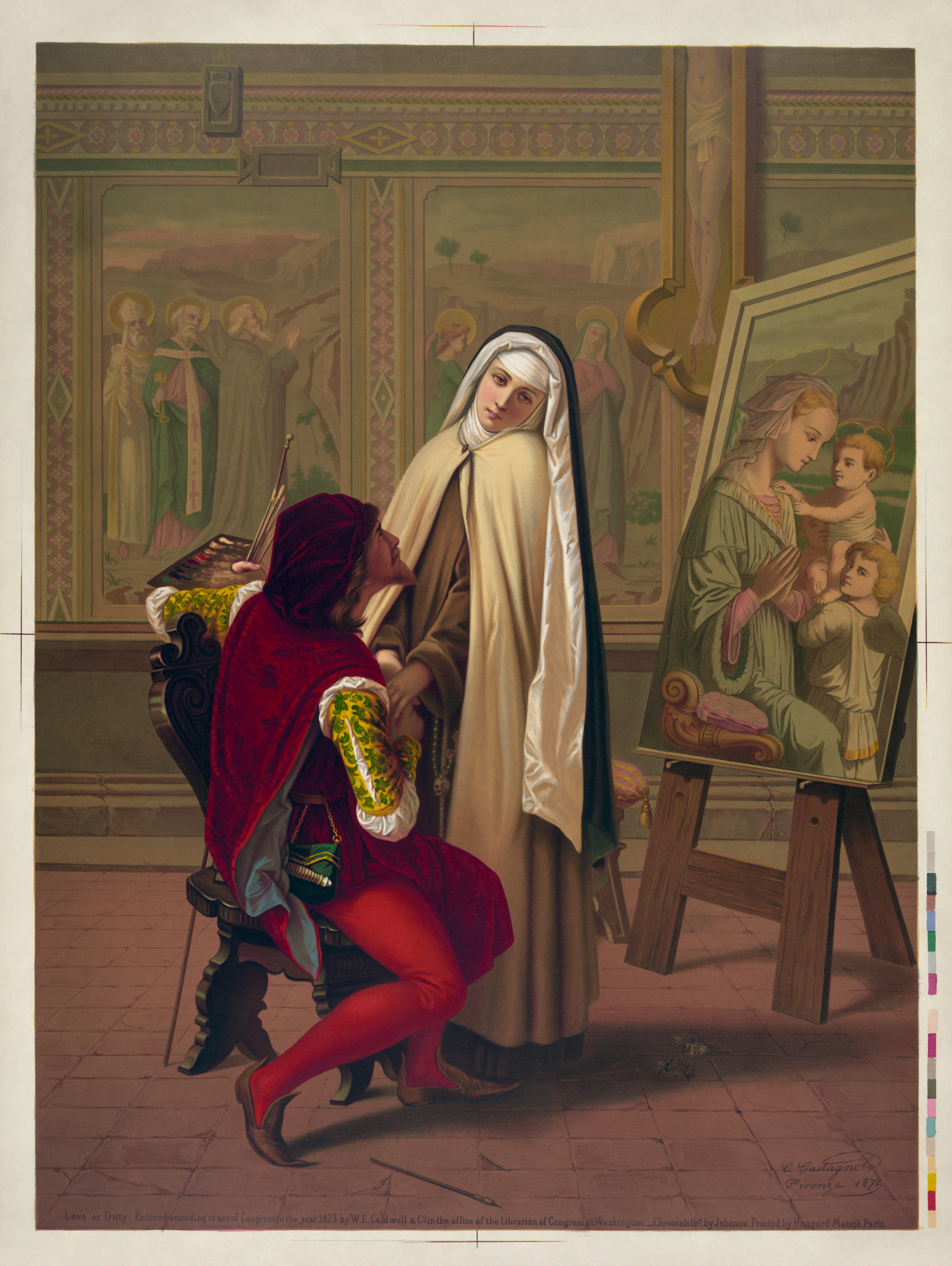
"Love or Duty", a chromolithograph by Gabriele Castagnola, 1873. The nineteen colours of ink used can be seen on the right hand side.

Chromolithography is a method for making multi-colour prints in lithography, and in theory includes all types of lithography that are printed in colour. However, in modern usage it is normally restricted to 19th-century works, and the higher quality examples from that period; almost all 21st-century colour printing uses lithography, but would not be described using the term chromolithography. When chromolithography is used to reproduce photographs, the term photochrome is frequently used. Lithography is a method of printing on flat surfaces using a flat printing plate instead of raised relief or recessed intaglio techniques.

Chromolithography became the most successful of several methods of colour printing developed in the 19th century. Other methods were developed by printers such as Jacob Christoph Le Blon, George Baxter and Edmund Evans, and mostly relied on using several woodblocks with different colours. Hand-colouring also remained important. For example, elements of the official British Ordnance Survey maps were coloured by hand by boys until 1875. The initial chromolithographic technique involved the use of multiple lithographic stones, one for each colour, and was still extremely expensive when done for the best quality results. Depending on the number of colours present, a chromolithograph could take even very skilled workers months to produce.

However, much cheaper prints could be produced by simplifying the number of colours used, and reducing the detail in the image. Cheaper images, like advertisements, relied heavily on an initial black print (not always a lithograph), on which colours were then overprinted. To make an expensive reproduction print, once referred to as a "chromo", a lithographer, with a finished painting in front of him, gradually created and corrected the many stones using proofs to look as much as possible like the painting, sometimes using dozens of layers.

Oleograph is sometimes used as a synonym for a chromolithograph, but more properly refers to a chromolithograph that has then been treated to imitate the variable surface of an oil painting, either by brushing with varnish, or some form of embossing or stamping. The print is usually glued to canvas to further the imitation.

== Process ==
Lithography, including chromolithography, is a process based on the rejection of water by grease. The image is applied to stone, grained zinc or aluminium surfaces, with a grease-based crayon or ink. Limestone and zinc are two commonly used materials in the production of chromolithographs, as aluminium production was limited before the invention of the Hall–Héroult process. After the image is drawn onto one of these surfaces, the image is gummed-up with a gum arabic solution and weak nitric acid to protect the remaining surface before inking up the image with oil based transfer or printing ink. Before final printing, the image is proof printed and any errors corrected. In the direct form of printing, the inked image is transferred under pressure onto a sheet of paper using a flat-bed press. The offset indirect method uses a rubber-covered cylinder that transfers the image from the printing surface to the paper. Colours may be overprinted by using additional stones or plates to achieve a closer reproduction of the original. Accurate registration for multi-coloured work is achieved by the use of a key outline image and registration bars which are applied to each stone or plate before drawing the solid or tone image. Ben-Day medium uses a raised gelatin stipple image to give tone gradation. An air-brush sprays ink to give soft edges. These are just two methods used to achieve gradations of tone. The use of twelve overprinted colours would not be considered unusual. Each sheet of paper will therefore pass through the printing press as many times as there are colours in the final print. In order that each colour is placed in the right position, each stone or plate must be precisely 'registered', or lined up, on the paper using a system of register marks.

Prints described as chromolithographs are typically smaller than posters and advertisements, both common types of colour lithographs in the later 19th century and subsequently, and are of finer quality, generally suitable for framing as prints. Autolithographs are prints where the artist draws, and sometimes prints, their own limited number of reproductions.

== Origins ==
Uncle Sam Supplying the World with Berry Brothers Hard Oil Finish, c. 1880. This cheaply produced chromolithographic advertisement employs a technique called stippling, with heavy reliance on the initial black line print.

Alois Senefelder, the inventor of lithography, introduced the subject of coloured lithography in his 1818 Vollstaendiges Lehrbuch der Steindruckerey (A Complete Course of Lithography), where he told of his plans to print using colour and explained the colours he wished to be able to print someday. Although Senefelder recorded plans for chromolithography, printers in other countries, such as France and England, were also trying to find a new way to print in colour. Godefroy Engelmann of Mulhouse in France was awarded a patent on chromolithography in July 1837, but there are disputes over whether chromolithography was already in use before this date, as some sources say, pointing to areas of printing such as the production of playing cards.

== Arrival in the United States ==
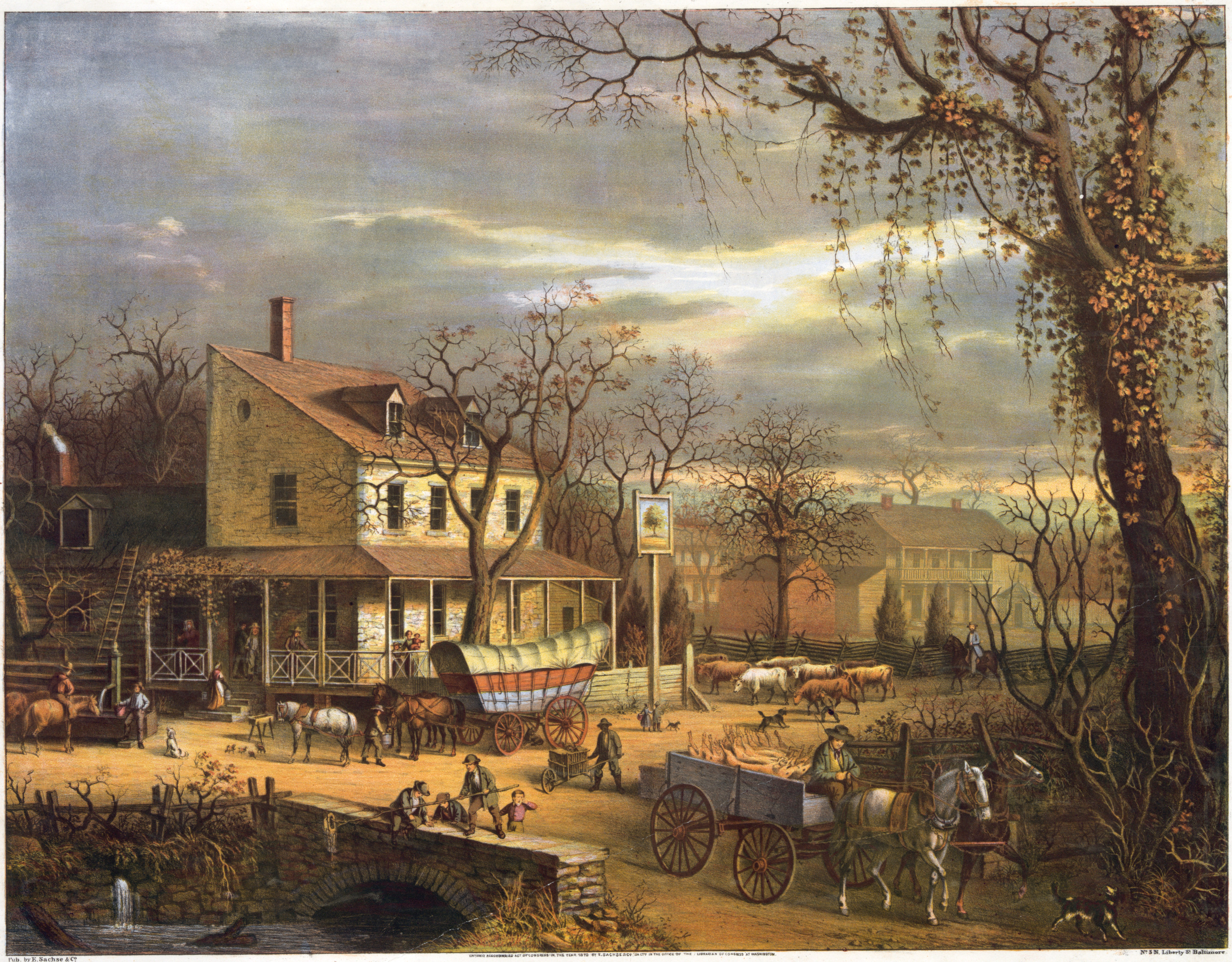
1872 chromolithograph of roadside inn, published in Maryland

The first American chromolithograph—a portrait of Reverend F. W. P. Greenwood—was created by William Sharp in 1840. Many of the chromolithographs were created and purchased in urban areas. The prints were initially used as decoration in American parlours as well as for decoration within middle-class homes. They were prominent after the Civil War because of their low production costs and ability to be mass-produced, and because the methods allowed pictures to look more like hand-painted oil paintings. Production costs were only low if the chromolithographs were cheaply produced, but top-quality chromos were costly to produce because of the necessary months of work and the thousands of dollars' worth of equipment that had to be used.

Although chromos could be mass-produced, it took about three months to draw colours onto the stones and another five months to print a thousand copies. Chromolithographs became so popular in American culture that the era has been labeled as "chromo civilization". Over time, during the Victorian era, chromolithographs populated children's and fine arts publications, as well as advertising art, in trade cards, labels, and posters. They were also once used for advertisements, popular prints, and medical or scientific books.

== Opposition to chromolithography ==
Even though chromolithographs served many uses within society at the time, many were opposed to the idea of them because of their perceived lack of authenticity. The new forms of art were sometimes tagged as "bad art" because of their deceptive qualities. Some also felt that it could not serve as a form of art at all since it was too mechanical, and that the true spirit of a painter could never be captured in a printed version of a work. Over time, many chromos came to be made so cheaply that they could no longer be confused with original paintings. Since production costs were low, the fabrication of cheap chromolithographs became more a business than the creation of art, in contrast with the high quality chromolithographs targeted primarily at art-oriented audiences.

== Notable printers ==
=== Louis Prang ===
A famous lithographer and publisher who strongly supported the production of chromolithographs was Louis Prang. Prang was a German-born entrepreneur who printed the first American Christmas card. He felt that chromolithographs could look just as good as, if not better than, real paintings, and he published well-known chromolithographs based on popular paintings, including one by Eastman Johnson entitled The Barefoot Boy. The reason Prang decided to take on the challenge of producing chromolithographs, despite criticisms, was because he felt quality art should not be limited to the elite. Prang and others who continued to produce chromolithographs were sometimes looked down upon because of the fear that chromolithographs could undermine human abilities. With the Industrial Revolution already under way, this fear was not something new to Americans at the time. Many artists themselves anticipated the lack of desire for original artwork since many became accustomed to chromolithographs. As a way to make more sales, some artists had a few paintings made into chromolithographs so that people in society would at least be familiar with the painter. Once people in society were familiar with the artist, they were more likely to want to pay for an original work.

=== Lothar Meggendorfer ===
German chromolithographers, largely based in Bavaria, came to dominate the trade with their low-cost high-volume productions. Of these printers, Lothar Meggendorfer garnered international fame for his children's educational books and games. Owing to political unrest in mid-19th century Germany, many Bavarian printers emigrated to the United Kingdom and the United States, and Germany's monopoly on chromolithographic printing dissipated.

=== August Hoen ===
A. Hoen & Co., led by German immigrant August Hoen, were a prominent lithography house now known primarily for its stunning E.T. Paull sheet music covers. They also made advertisements, maps, and cigar box art. Hoen and his brothers Henry and Ernest took over the E. Weber Company in the mid-1850s upon Edward Weber's death. August Hoen's son Alfred ran the firm from 1886 throughout the early 20th century.

=== Rufus Bliss ===
Rufus Bliss founded R. Bliss Mfg. Co., which was located in Pawtucket, Rhode Island from 1832 to 1914. The Bliss company is best known for their highly sought after paper litho on wood dollhouses. They also made many other lithoed toys, including boats, trains, and building blocks.

=== M. & N. Hanhart ===
Established in Mulhouse in 1830 by Michael Hanhart who initially worked with Godefroy Engelmann in London. The firm, established at Charlotte Street, Fitzroy Square, was named after his two sons Michael and Nicholas. Artists like Joseph Wolf, Joseph Smit, J G Keulemans and others worked for him to produce natural history illustrations that were used in the Ibis (1859–1874), Proceedings of the Zoological Society of London (1848–1900), works by P.H. Gosse, and a range of books. The company wound up in 1902 after the death of Nicholas Hanhart and the rise of new printing techniques.

== Uses ==
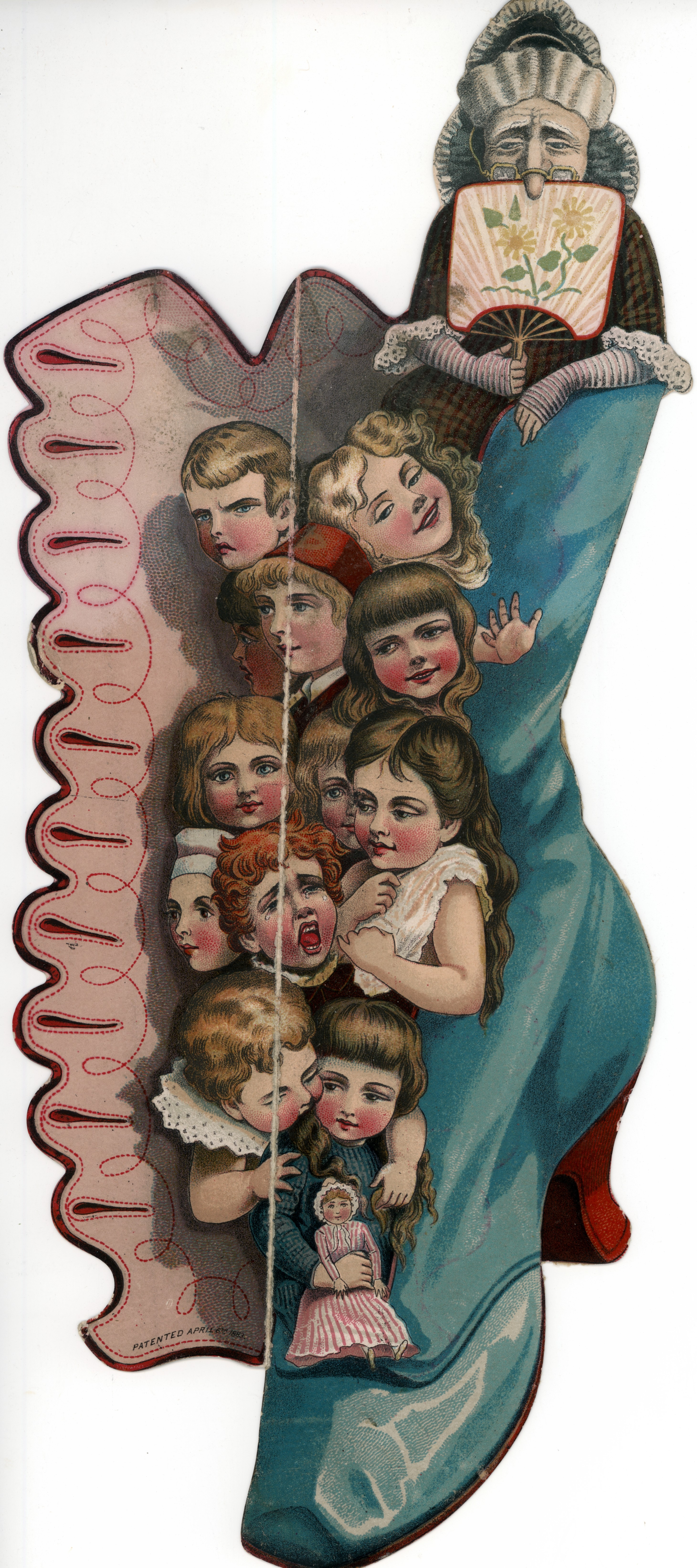
Folding Card, The Old Woman Who Lived in A Shoe, 6 April 1883

Chromolithographs are mainly used today as fine art instead of advertisements, and they are hard to find because of poor preservation and the cheaper forms of printing that replaced them. Many chromolithographs have deteriorated because of the acidic frames surrounding them. As stated earlier, production costs of chromolithographs were low, but efforts were still being made to find a cheaper and faster way to mass-produce coloured prints. Although purchasing a chromolithograph may have been cheaper than purchasing a painting, it was still expensive in comparison to other colour printing methods which were later developed. Offset printing replaced chromolithography in the late 1930s.

To find or purchase a lithograph, some suggest searching for examples with the original frame as well as the publisher's stamp. Both European and American chromolithographs can still be found, and can range in cost from hundreds to thousands of dollars. The least expensive chromos tend to be European or produced by publishers who are less well-known compared to Prang.

== Bibliography ==
- Twyman, Michael. A History of Chromolithography: Printed Colour for All. The British Library/Oak Knoll Press, 2013.
- Friedman, Joan M. Colour Printing in England, 1486–1859. Yale Center for British Art, 1978.
- Henker, Michael. Von Senefelder zu Daumier: Die Anfange der Lithograpischen Kunst. K.G. Saur, 1988.
- Jay, Robert. The Trade Card in Nineteenth-Century America. University of Missouri Press, 1987.
- Last, Jay T. The Colour Explosion: Nineteenth-Century American Lithography. Hillcrest Press, 2005.
- Marzio, Peter C. The Democratic Art: Pictures for a 19th-century America : Chromolithography, 1840–1900. D. R. Godine, 1979.

== See also ==
- Planography
- Photochrom
- Color printing
- Zincography
- History of graphic design
- Lithography
- William Griggs, 19th-century inventor of "photo-chromo-lithography"
