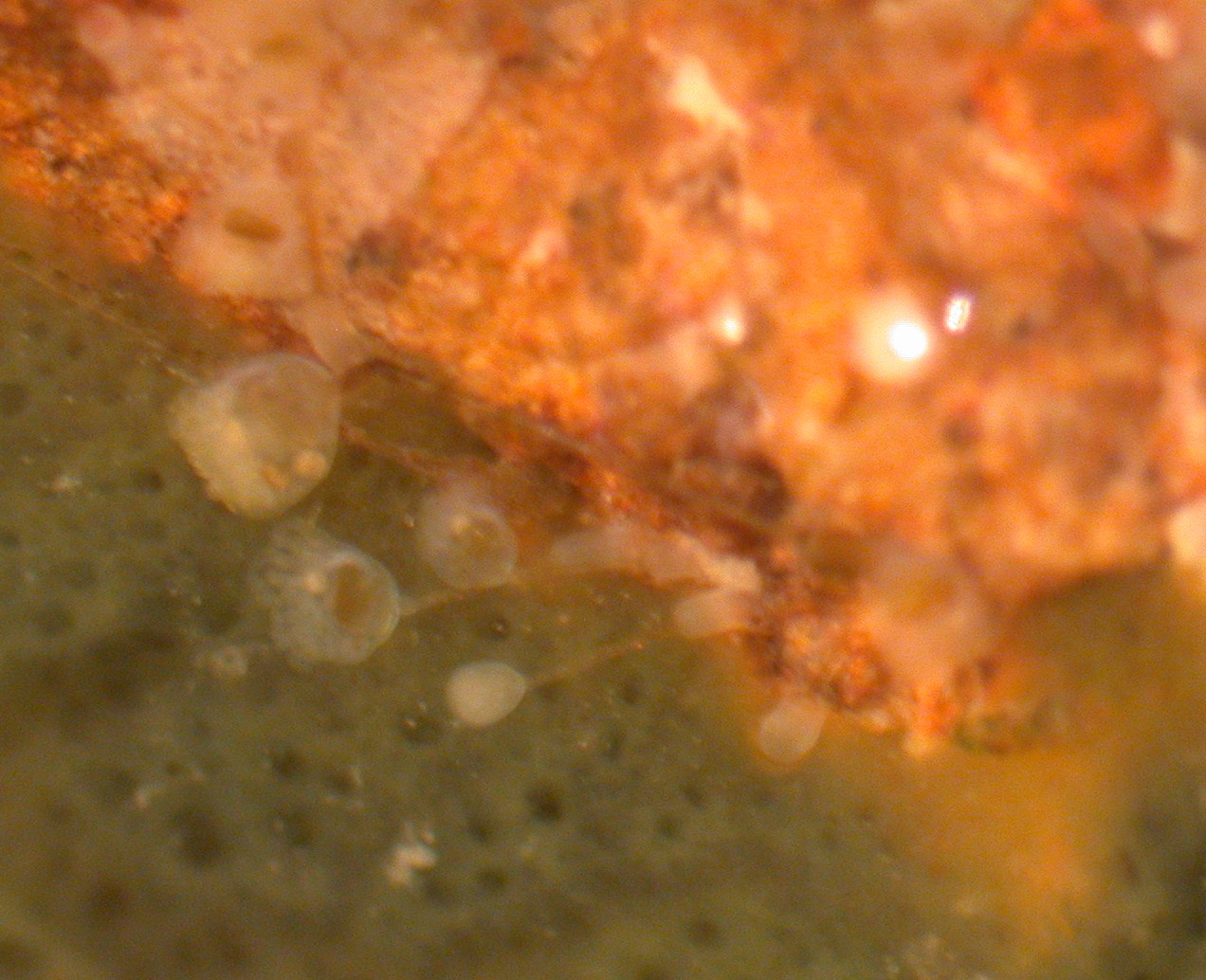
- Barentsia discreta

Scientific classification
- Domain: Eukaryota
- Kingdom: Animalia
- Phylum: Entoprocta
- Family: Barentsiidae; Emschermann, 1972

= Barentsiidae =

Family of marine animals

Barentsiidae is a family of Entoprocta, sometimes classified in the order Solitaria.

== Taxonomy ==
The content of Barentsiidae (sometimes without the genus Urnatella) is sometimes classified as part of the family Pedicellinidae.

The genus Urnatella (here classified in Barentsiidae) has been classified by some authors as the only genus of a separate family called Urnatellidae since the mid-19th century. Since 1915, the genus Loxosomatoides (today usually classified in Pedicellinidae sensu stricto) has been added to the family Urnatellidae by some authors.

== Genera ==
Genera:

- Barentsia Hincks, 1880
- Coriella Kluge, 1946
- Pedicellinopsis Hincks, 1884
- Pseudopedicellina Toriumi, 1951
- Urnatella Leidy, 1851
