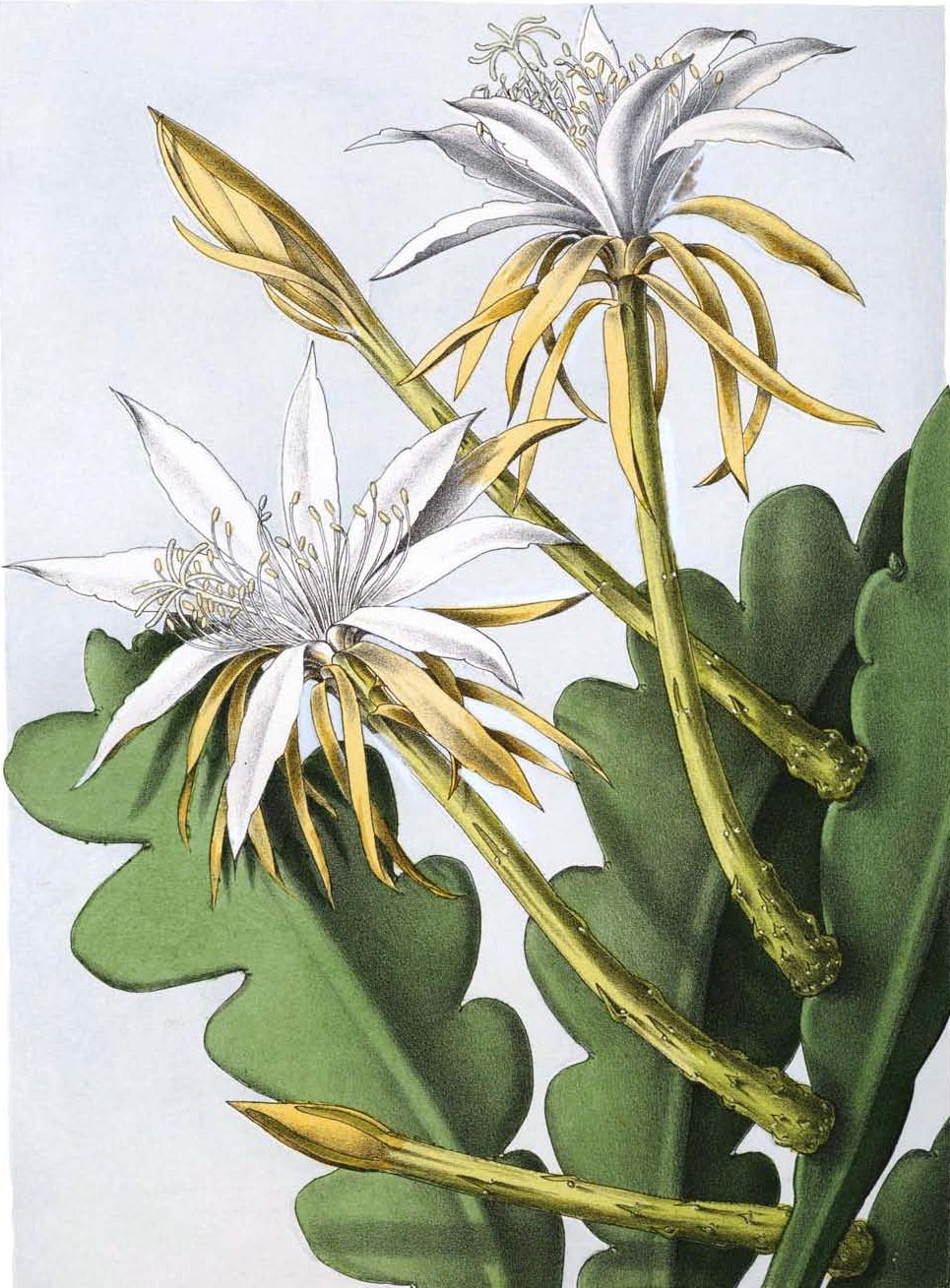
- Disocactus anguliger

Scientific classification
- Kingdom: Plantae
- Clade: Tracheophytes
- Clade: Angiosperms
- Clade: Eudicots
- Order: Caryophyllales
- Family: Cactaceae
- Subfamily: Cactoideae
- Tribe: Hylocereeae; Buxbaum

= Hylocereeae =

Tribe of cacti

The Hylocereeae are a tribe of cacti. Most are found in the tropical forests of Central and northern South America, and are climbers or epiphytes, unlike most cacti. The tribe includes between six and eight genera in different circumscriptions. The plants known as "epiphyllum hybrids" or "epiphyllums", widely grown for their flowers, are hybrids of species within this tribe, particularly Disocactus, Pseudorhipsalis and Selenicereus, less often Epiphyllum, in spite of the common name.

== Description ==
The members of the tribe are very variable in their morphology, especially when the terrestrial Acanthocereus is included. Many species form aerial roots. The hylocereoid clade (Selenicereus, Weberocereus and probably Aporocactus) are mostly climbing or epiphytic, and have spiny ribbed stems. The phyllocactoid clade (Epiphyllum, Disocactus, Kimnachia and Pseudorhipsalis) are mainly epiphytic, and have spineless flattened leaf-like stems. Flowers and pollination syndromes are equally diverse, ranging from large white nocturnal flowers to bright red flowers opening in the daytime.

== Taxonomy ==
The group was first identified by Britton and Rose in 1920 as the subtribe Hylocereinae of the tribe Cereeae (subtribe Hylocereanae of tribe Cereanae in their terminology). In 1958, Buxbaum revised the subtribe Hylocereinae, placing it in a newly created tribe Hylocereeae, which included four other subtribes, some containing genera removed from Hylocereinae, others containing different genera.

The International Cactaceae Systematics Group classification, based on Barthlott & Hunt (1993), recognized six genera within the tribe. Subsequent studies suggested a number of changes, for example including Acanthocereus in the tribe and excluding Strophocactus (which had been sunk into Selenicereus). It was also shown that Hylocereus was nested within Selenicereus. A major molecular phylogenetic study of the tribe was published in 2017. The lefthand cladogram below shows the relationships obtained (using the authors' circumscriptions of the genera and tribe). A 2020 phylogenetic study, which also included morphological features of the stem, produced the righthand cladogram below. This resolved the position of Aporocactus, placing it within the hyloceroid clade, but left relationships within the phyllocactoid clade unresolved.

- Hylocereeae
  - - Acanthocereus
  - - Aporocactus
  - - hylocereoid clade
      - Selenicereus
      - Weberocereus
    - phyllocactoid clade
      - Pseudorhipsalis
      - - Kimnachia
        - Epiphyllum
        - Disocactus

- - hylocereoid clade
  - phyllocactoid clade

The authors of the 2017 study proposed revised circumscriptions of some of the genera and of the tribe to make them monophyletic according to their molecular phylogeny:

- Acanthocereus, which had been included in Hylocereeae by some earlier authors, but also in Echinocereeae, Pachycereeae and Phyllocacteae, was expanded to include Peniocereus subg. Pseudoacanthocereus, and restored to Hylocereeae.
- Aporocactus was separated again from Disocactus.
- Selenicereus was expanded to include part of Weberocereus and the whole of Hylocereus, which was nested within it. Strophocactus wittii, which had been included in Selenicereus, was excluded from the Hylocereeae altogether, along with the genus Deamia, containing two species that had been placed in either Strophocactus or Selenicereus.
- To maintain the monophyly of Pseudorhipsalis, Pseudorhipsalis ramulosa was moved to a new genus, Kimnachia, as Kimnachia ramulosa.

The table below compares the 1993 and 2017 classifications.

Circumscriptions of Hylocereeae
Barthlott & Hunt (1993)	Korotkova et al. (2017)
–	Acanthocereus
Disocactus	Aporocactus
Disocactus	Disocactus
Epiphyllum	Epiphyllum
Hylocereus	Selenicereus (excluding Strophocactus and Deamia)
Selenicereus	Selenicereus (excluding Strophocactus and Deamia)
Weberocereus s.l.	Selenicereus (excluding Strophocactus and Deamia)
	Weberocereus s.s.
Pseudorhipsalis	Pseudorhipsalis
Pseudorhipsalis	Kimnachia

=== Genera ===
The tribe Hylocereeae includes eight genera in the 2017 classification by Korotkova et al.

- Acanthocereus (Engelm. ex A.Berger) Britton & Rose (13 species)
- Aporocactus Lem. (2 species)
- Disocactus Lindl. (15 species)
- Epiphyllum Haw. (10 species)
- Kimnachia S.Arias & N.Korotkova (1 species)
- Pseudorhipsalis Britton & Rose (5 species)
- Selenicereus (A.Berger) Britton & Rose (31 species)
- Weberocereus Britton & Rose (6 species)

As of March 2021, the acceptance of some of these genera varied. For example, Plants of the World Online accepted Aporocactus and the sinking of Hylocereus into Selenicereus, but did not accept Kimnachia.

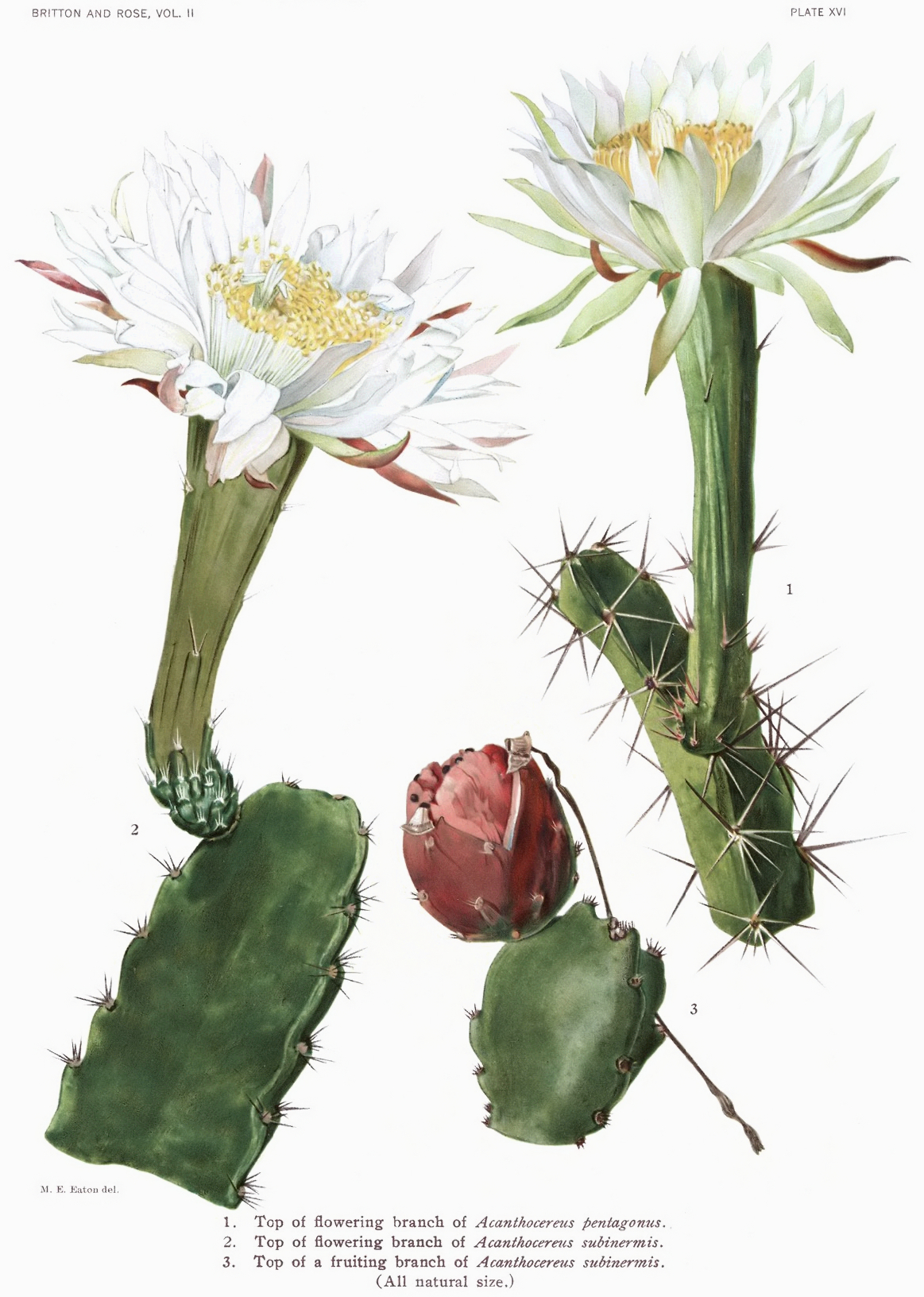
Acanthocereus tetragonus flower (right), A. subinermis flower and fruit (left)

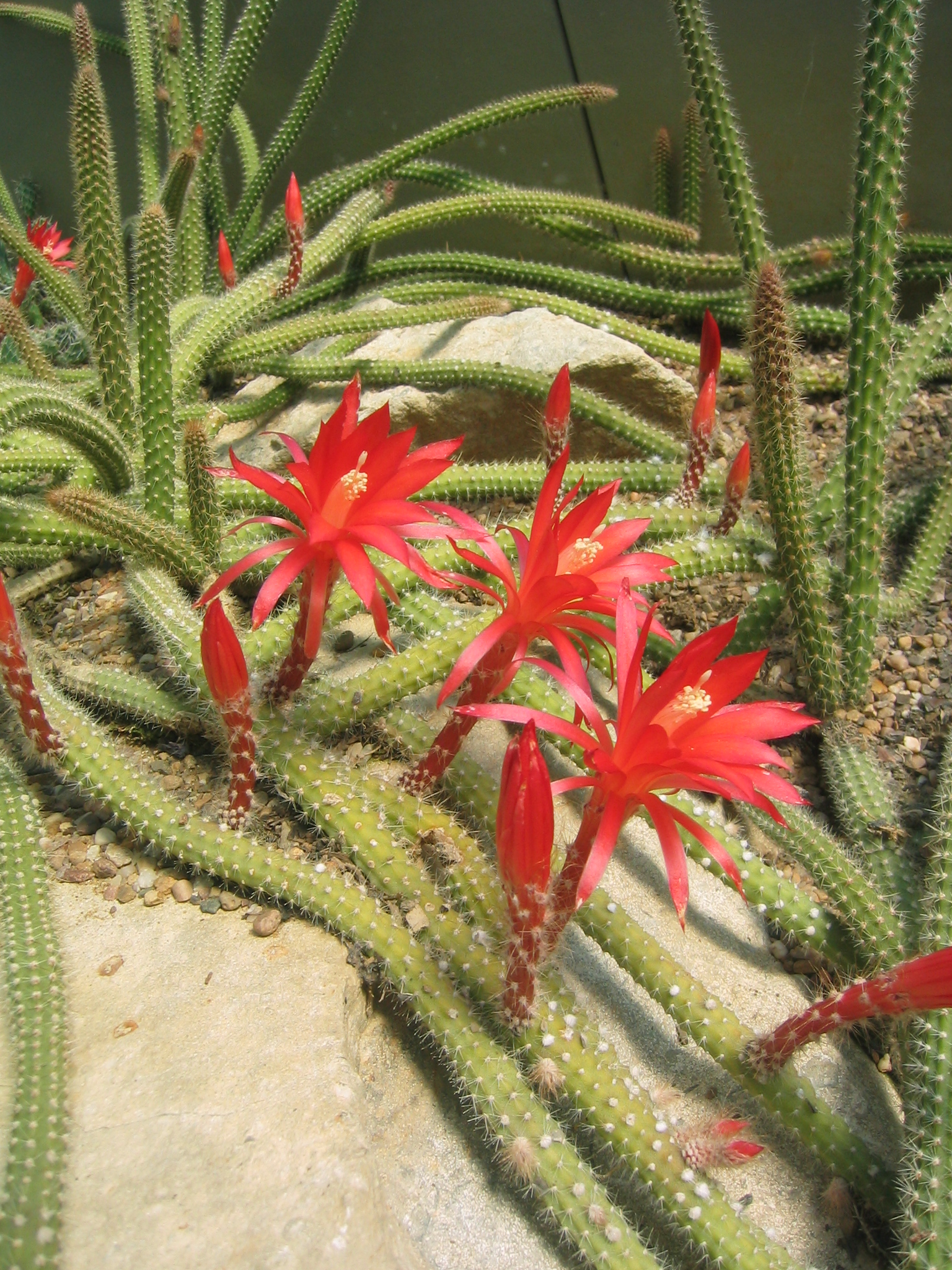
Aporocactus martianus

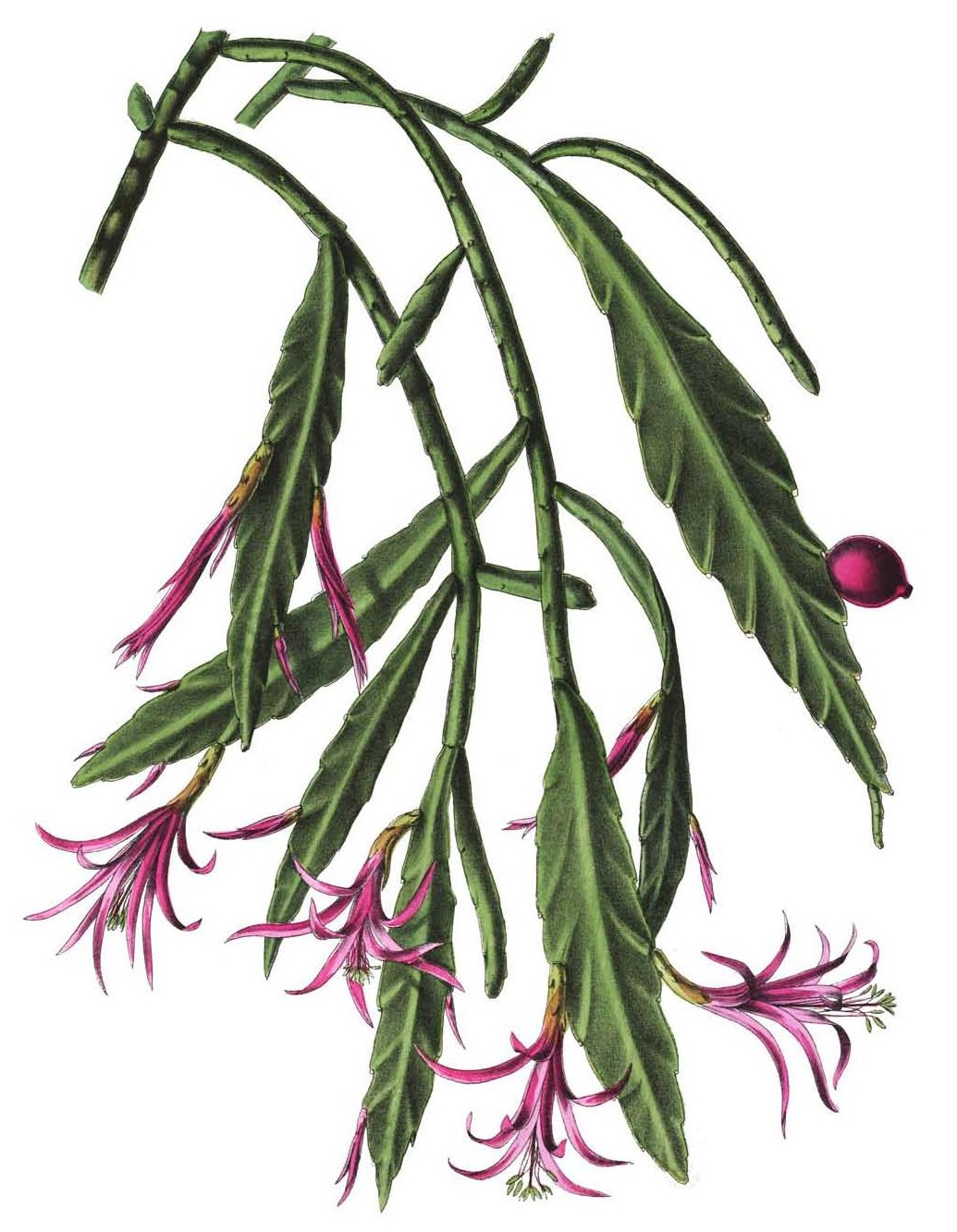
Disocactus biformis

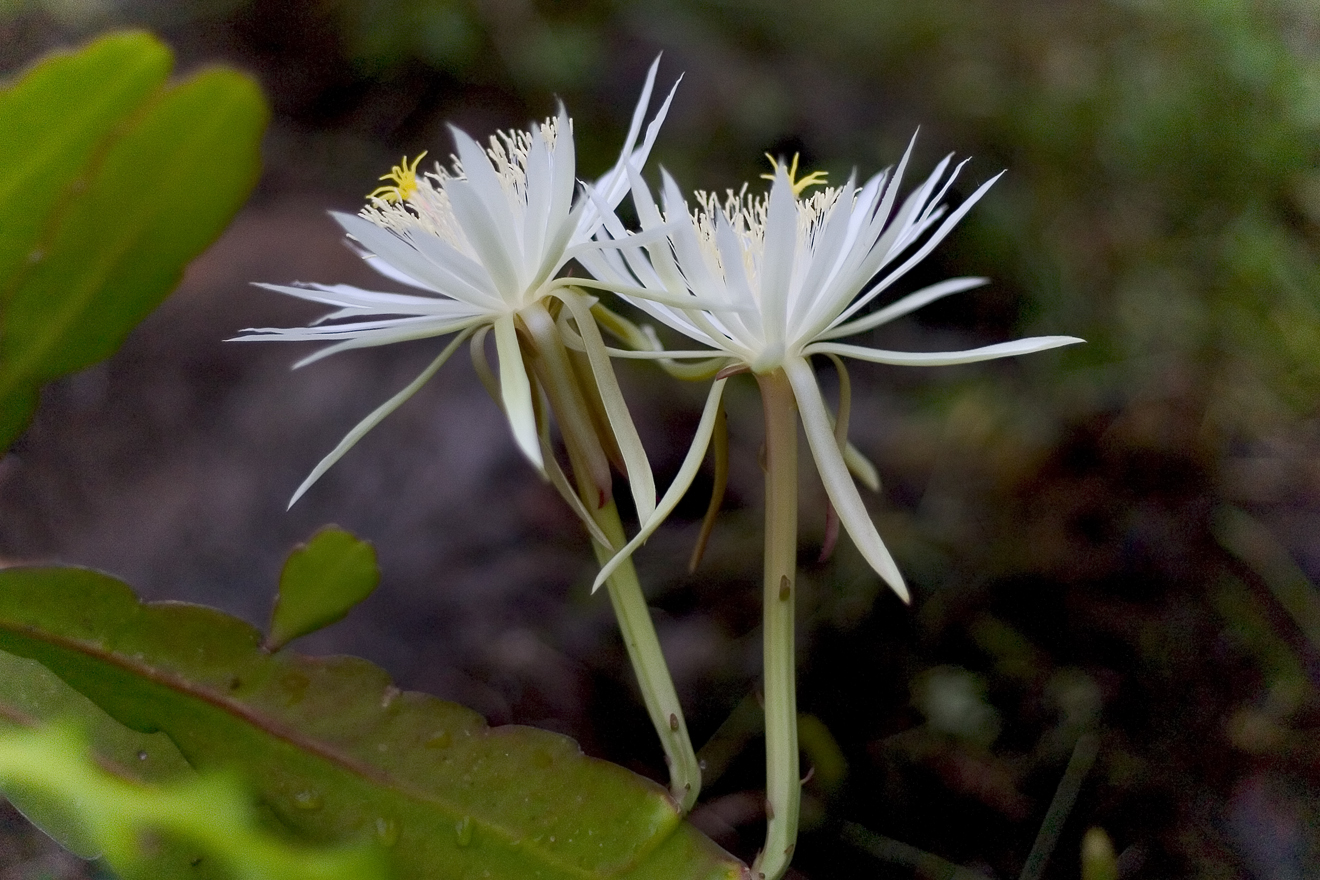
Epiphyllum hookeri
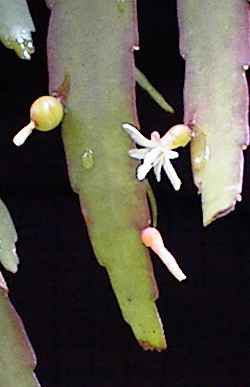
Kimnachia ramulosa

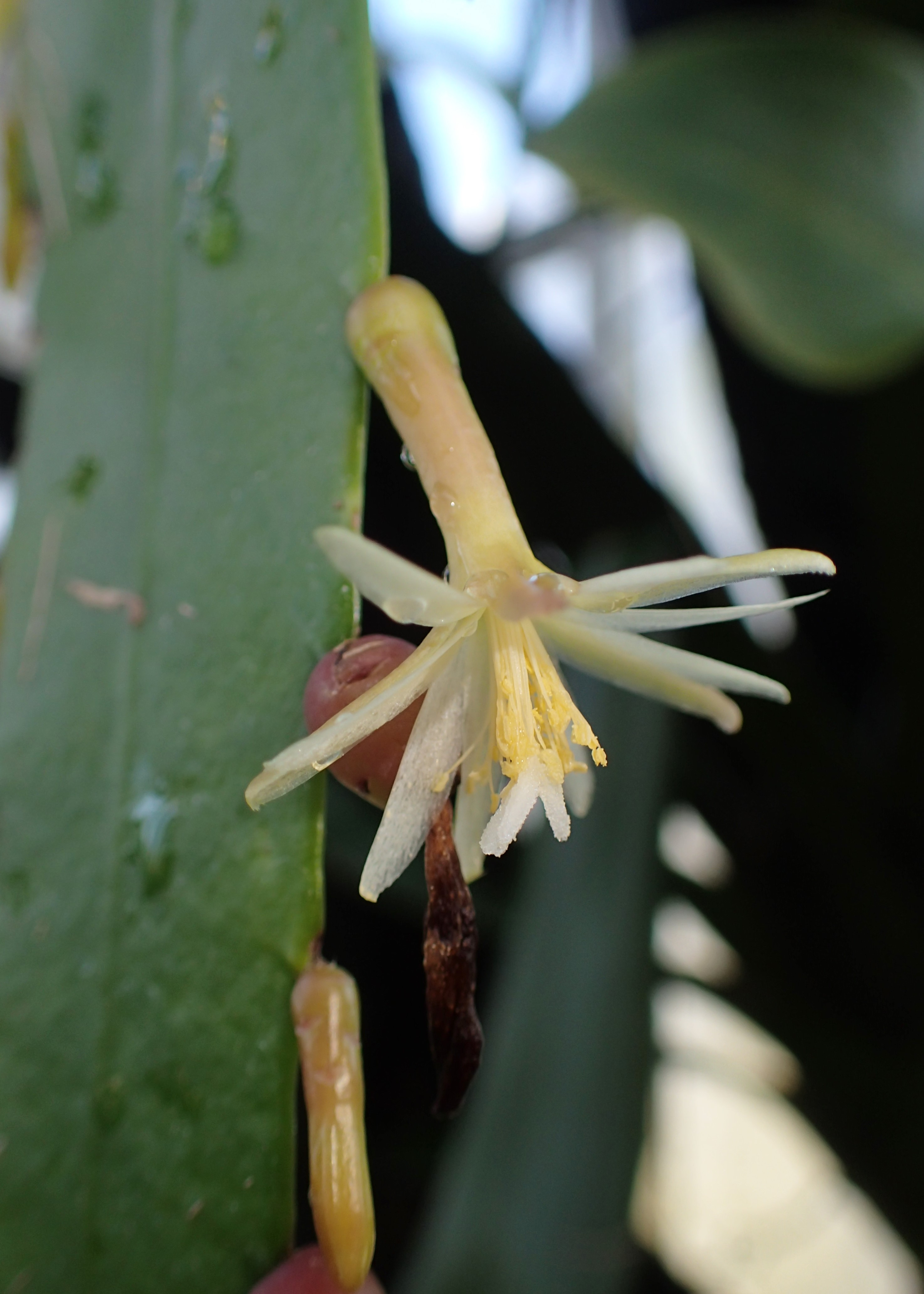
Pseudorhipsalis himantoclada

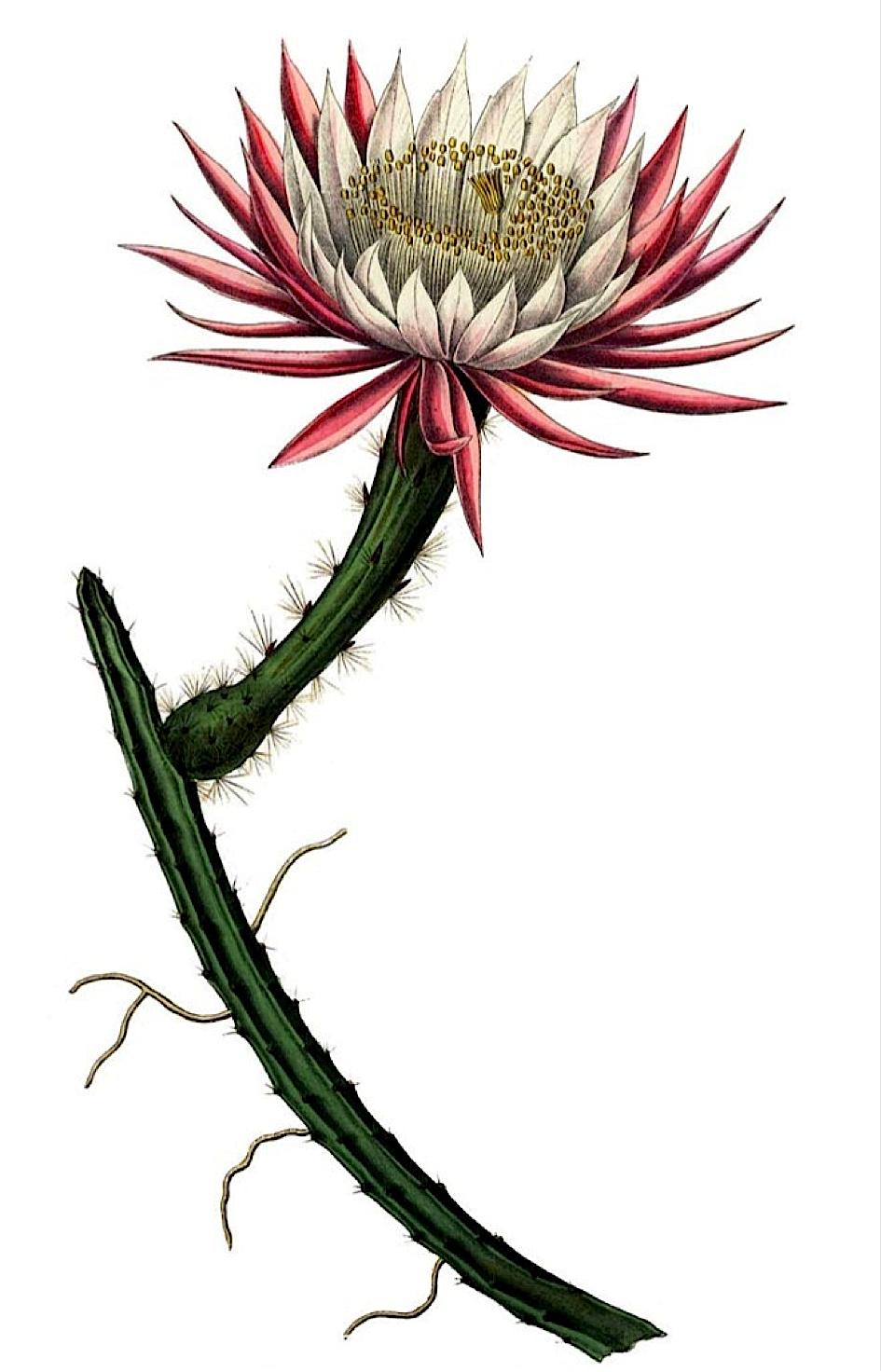
Selenicereus spinulosus

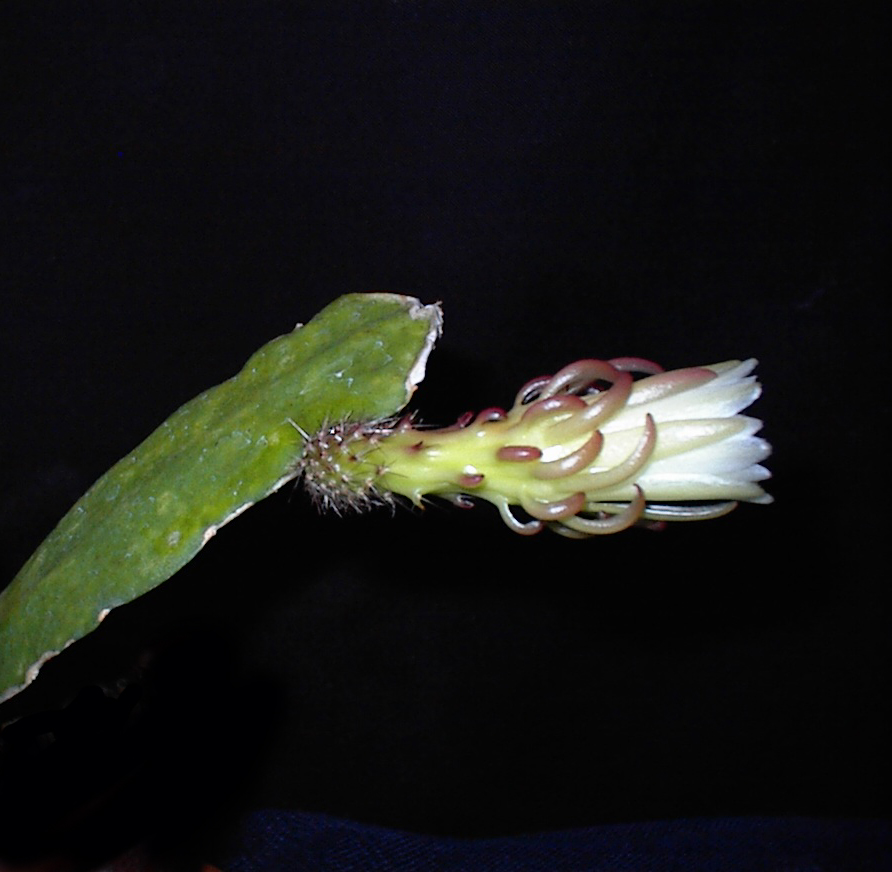
Weberocereus rosei

== Distribution ==
Selenicereus is the largest genus in the tribe, and is native from Texas though Central America and the Caribbean into South America as far as Northeast Argentina. Other genera have a more restricted distribution within this area; for example, the two species of Aporocactus are native to Mexico.
