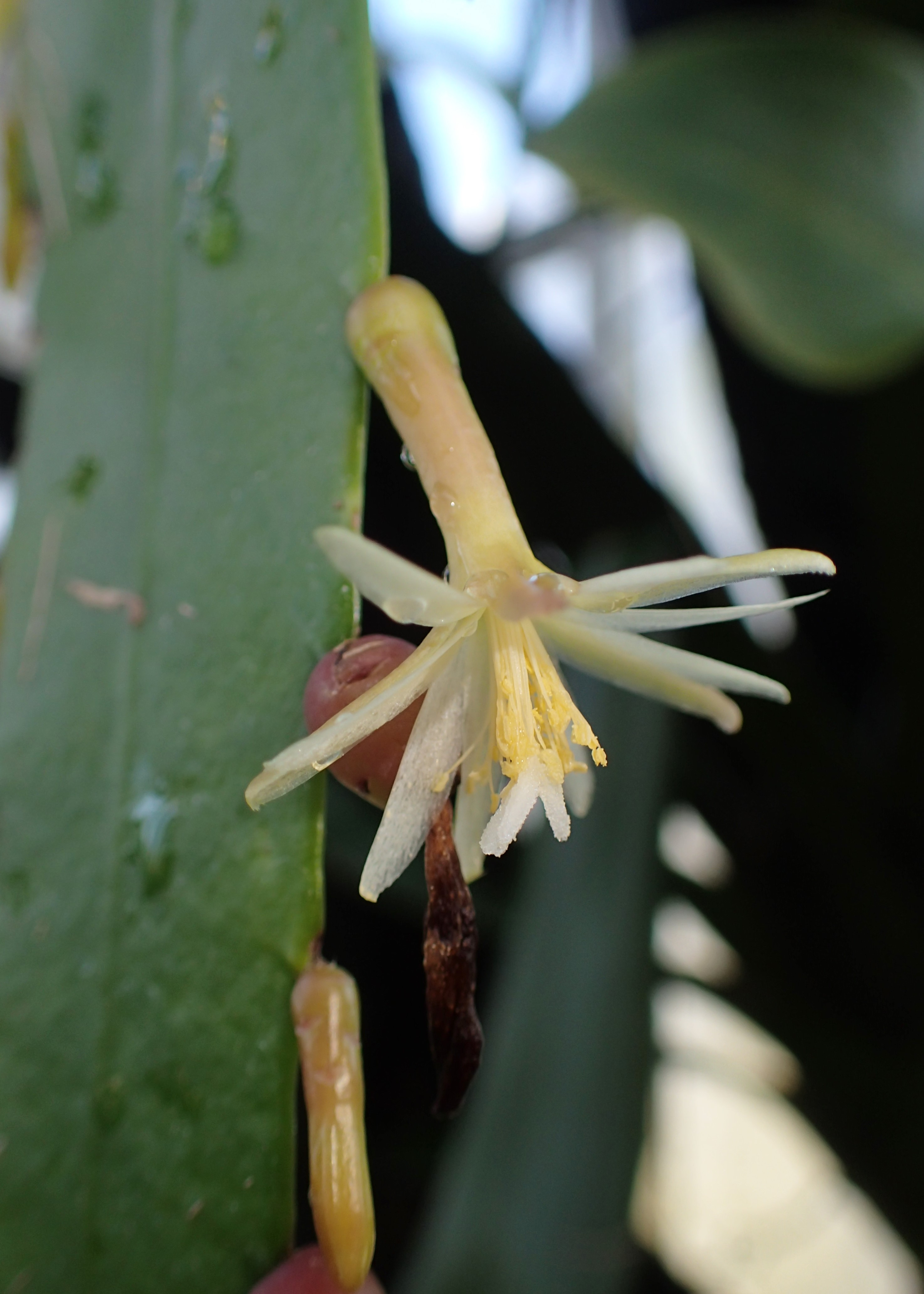
- Pseudorhipsalis himantoclada

Scientific classification
- Kingdom: Plantae
- Clade: Tracheophytes
- Clade: Angiosperms
- Clade: Eudicots
- Order: Caryophyllales
- Family: Cactaceae
- Subfamily: Cactoideae
- Tribe: Hylocereeae
- Genus: Pseudorhipsalis; Britton & Rose

Type species
- Pseudorhipsalis alata

Species
- see text

= Pseudorhipsalis =

Genus of cacti

Pseudorhipsalis is genus of cacti. This genus is often included in Disocactus. It is epiphytic, many branched, and elongated with flattened, serrated cladodes. In its early life, it stands erect, but soon becomes prostrate. It produces numerous flowers.

== Description ==
This genus is similar to Rhipsalis in that epiphytic species with small creamy white flowers are found. However, the flowers are different in that the ovaries and parts of the perianth are connected and the fruits have scales. Also, this genus is limited to Central America, with the exception of one species that ranges in South America. Areoles are small along the stem margin, usually at a higher level. From these areoles, new stems or flowers form. The flowers are small, short tubes or glasses - creamy white. Fruits are small berries that can be white or reddish in color. This genus is very scarce in cultivation.

== Species ==
A 2017 study of the tribe Hylocereeae accepted the following species:

Scientific name	Distribution	Image
Pseudorhipsalis acuminata Cufod.	Costa Rica	
Pseudorhipsalis alata (Sw.) Britton & Rose	Jamaica - Greater Antilles (West Indies - Caribbean)	
Pseudorhipsalis amazonica (K.Schum.) Ralf Bauer	Costa Rica, Panama, Brazil, Colombia, Ecuador, Peru, Venezuela	
Pseudorhipsalis himantoclada (Rol.-Goss.) Britton & Rose	Costa Rica, Panama	
Pseudorhipsalis lankesteri (Kimnach) Barthlott	Costa Rica	

One species was transferred to the new genus Kimnachia:

- Pseudorhipsalis ramulosa (Salm-Dyck) Barthlott → Kimnachia ramulosa
