= Pseudorhipsalis lankesteri =

Scientific classification
- Kingdom: Plantae
- Clade: Tracheophytes
- Clade: Angiosperms
- Clade: Eudicots
- Order: Caryophyllales
- Family: Cactaceae
- Subfamily: Cactoideae
- Genus: Pseudorhipsalis
- Species: P. lankesteri

Binomial name
- Pseudorhipsalis lankesteri (Kimnach) Barthlott

Species of plant

Pseudorhipsalis lankesteri is an epiphytic root climber endemic to Costa Rica found in the upper levels of the rainforest. It is a cactus (family Cactaceae) with flattened, succulent magenta-colored stems. The flowers are cream-colored.
