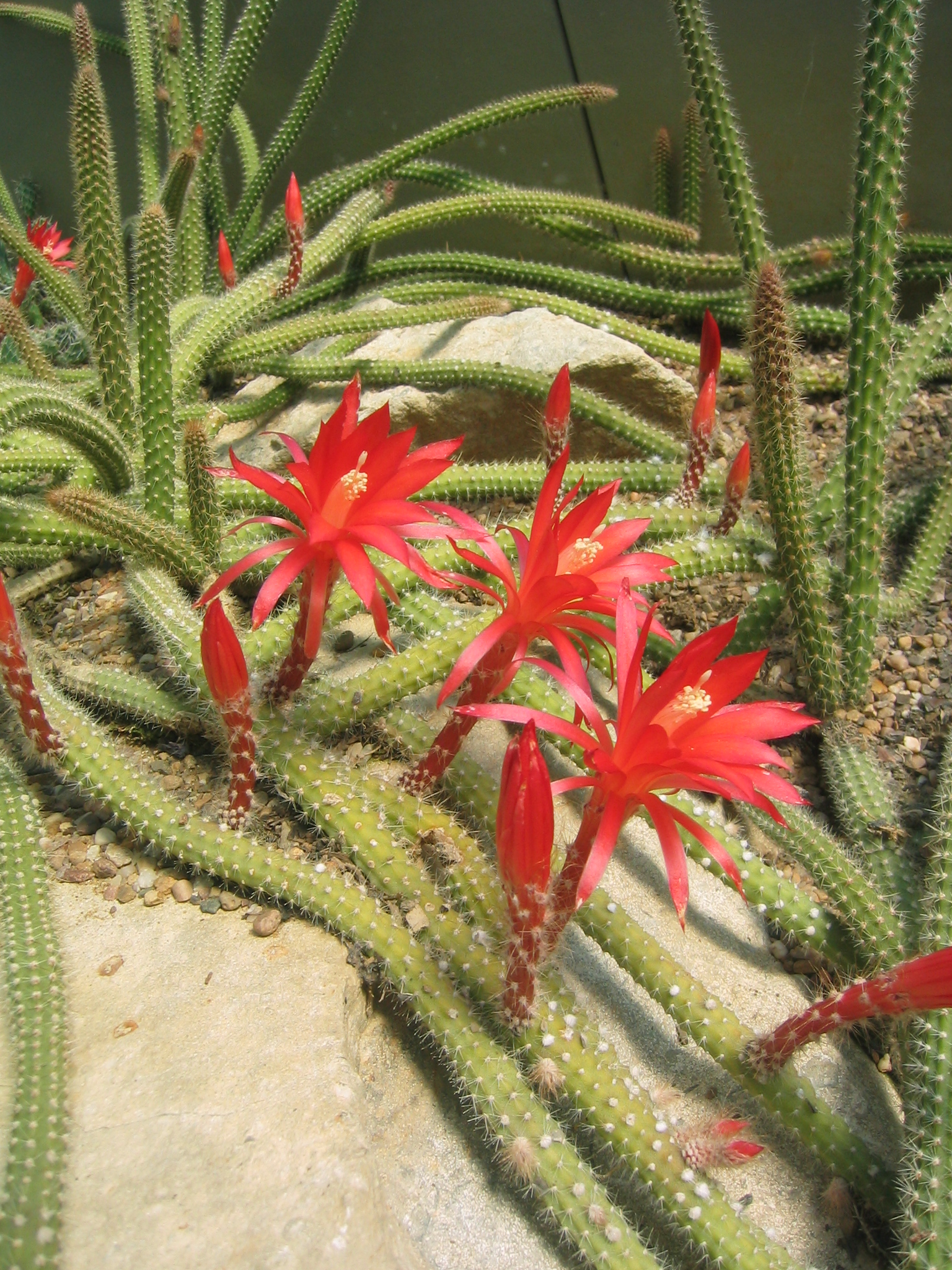
- Aporocactus martianus

Scientific classification
- Kingdom: Plantae
- Clade: Tracheophytes
- Clade: Angiosperms
- Clade: Eudicots
- Order: Caryophyllales
- Family: Cactaceae
- Subfamily: Cactoideae
- Tribe: Hylocereeae
- Genus: Aporocactus; Lem.

Species
- Aporocactus flagelliformis; Aporocactus martianus

= Aporocactus =

Genus of cacti

Aporocactus is a genus of cacti in the tribe Hylocereeae native to Mexico. It used to be classified as a subgenus in Disocactus, but according to molecular evidence, it should be excluded from Disocactus and treated as a separate genus.

== Description ==
It is an epiphytic genus growing on the branches of trees, but without parasitizing them. Occurs as drooping or creeping stems up to 60 cm with 6 ribs covered with many small spines.

== Extant Species ==
There are two species in the genus Aporocactus:

Scientific name	Distribution	Image
A. flagelliformis	Mexico (Hidalgo)	
A. martianus	Mexico (Oaxaca)	
