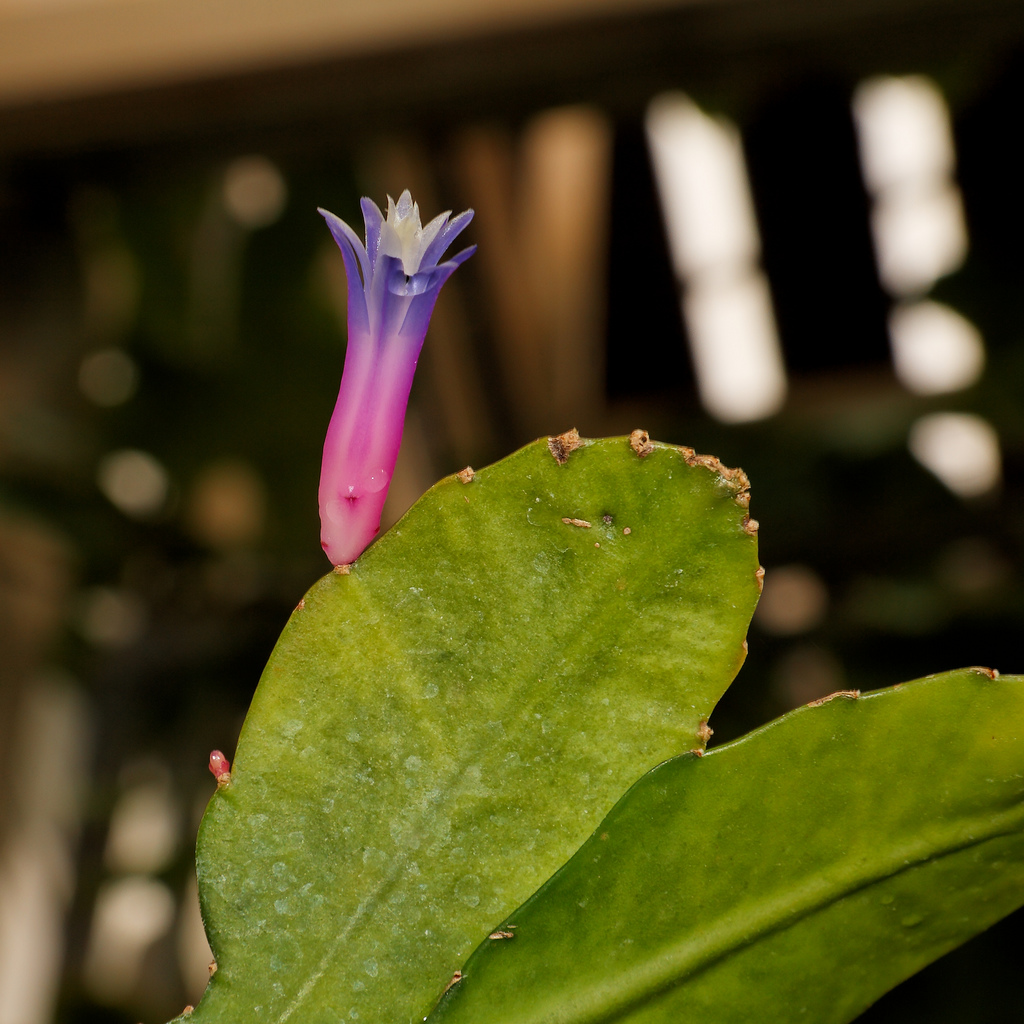

Conservation status
- Least Concern (IUCN 3.1)

Scientific classification
- Kingdom: Plantae
- Clade: Tracheophytes
- Clade: Angiosperms
- Clade: Eudicots
- Order: Caryophyllales
- Family: Cactaceae
- Subfamily: Cactoideae
- Genus: Pseudorhipsalis
- Species: P. amazonica

Binomial name
- Pseudorhipsalis amazonica (K.Schum.) Ralf Bauer

Synonyms
- Wittia amazonica K.Schum., 1903.; Wittiocactus amazonicus (K.Schum.) Rauschert, 1982.

= Pseudorhipsalis amazonica =

Species of flowering plant

Pseudorhipsalis amazonica is a species of Pseudorhipsalis found in Costa Rica, Panama, Brazil, Colombia, Ecuador, Peru, and Venezuela

== Description ==
Pseudorhipsalis amazonica grows richly branched, with bent to pendulous shoots. The initially upright main shoots are at the base up to 60 centimeters long stalk-like, twisting or two- to three-edged. The upper, leaf-like, flattened part is lanceolate, thornless and has a distinct central rib. It becomes up to 60 (rarely 80) centimeters long and 4 to 7 (rarely 3 to 8.5) centimeters wide. The edges are slightly notched. The side shoots appear from the upper parts of the main shoots, are up to 60 centimeters long and have a stalk-like base up to 4 centimeters long. The areoles are inconspicuous.

The protruding, narrow cylindrical flowers are carmine red. They are 25 to 50 millimeters long and have a flower tube up to 27 millimeters long. The outer bracts are blue, purple or magenta. The inner bracts are light blue, light magenta or white. The egg-shaped, whitish to yellowish fruits are smooth or slightly angular and are up to 15 millimeters long.

=== Subspecies ===
- Pseudorhipsalis amazonica subsp. amazonica
- Pseudorhipsalis amazonica subsp. chocoensis
- Pseudorhipsalis amazonica subsp. panamensis

== Distribution ==
This species is abundant in Ecuador and Peru and common in Panama. It is rare in Costa Rica, where the subpopulation occurs mostly in scattered individual plants. Only five or six collections are known from Costa Rica. In Costa Rica it occurs in the Diriá National Park. It can also be found in various protected areas in Ecuador. In some parts of its range, protection is provided due to the emergence of guerrilla warfare and the presence of drug producers, limiting the expansion of tourism, agro-industrial activities, and urban development.
