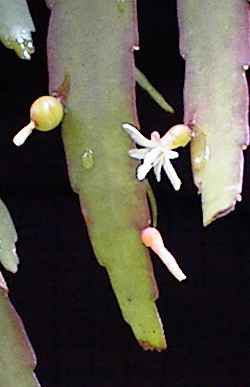

Conservation status
- Least Concern (IUCN 3.1)

Scientific classification
- Kingdom: Plantae
- Clade: Tracheophytes
- Clade: Angiosperms
- Clade: Eudicots
- Order: Caryophyllales
- Family: Cactaceae
- Subfamily: Cactoideae
- Tribe: Hylocereeae
- Genus: Kimnachia; S.Arias & N.Korotkova
- Species: K. ramulosa

Binomial name
- Kimnachia ramulosa (Salm-Dyck) S.Arias & N.Korotkova

Synonyms
- Cereus ramulosus Salm-Dyck; Disocactus ramulosus (Salm-Dyck) Kimnach; Epiphyllum ciliare Pfeiff.; Epiphyllum ciliatum Pfeiff.; Epiphyllum ramulosum Pfeiff.; Hariota coriacea (Pol.) Kuntze; Hariota ramulosa (Salm-Dyck) Kuntze; Pseudorhipsalis ramulosa (Salm-Dyck) Barthlott; Rhipsalis angustissima F.A.C.Weber; Rhipsalis coriacea Pol.; Rhipsalis leiophloea Vaupel; Rhipsalis purpusii Weing.; Rhipsalis ramulosa (Salm-Dyck) Pfeiff.

= Kimnachia =

Genus of cacti

Kimnachia is a monotypic genus of cacti. Its only species is Kimnachia ramulosa, synonym Pseudorhipsalis ramulosa, which is native from southern Mexico to northern South America and also found in Jamaica.

== Description ==
Kimnachia ramulosa is a shrubby plant, branching freely from the base. The stems are rounded basally, with branches that become flattened towards their tips. The branches are 10–25 cm (4–10 in) long and up to 2 cm (0.8 in) wide. They are reddish at first, later becoming green. The flowers are pinkish or greenish cream in colour, 7–12 mm (0.3–0.5 in) long and 10–14 mm (0.4–0.6 in) across. They are usually borne singly and hang downwards. The small whitish fruits are up to 8 mm (0.3 in) long.

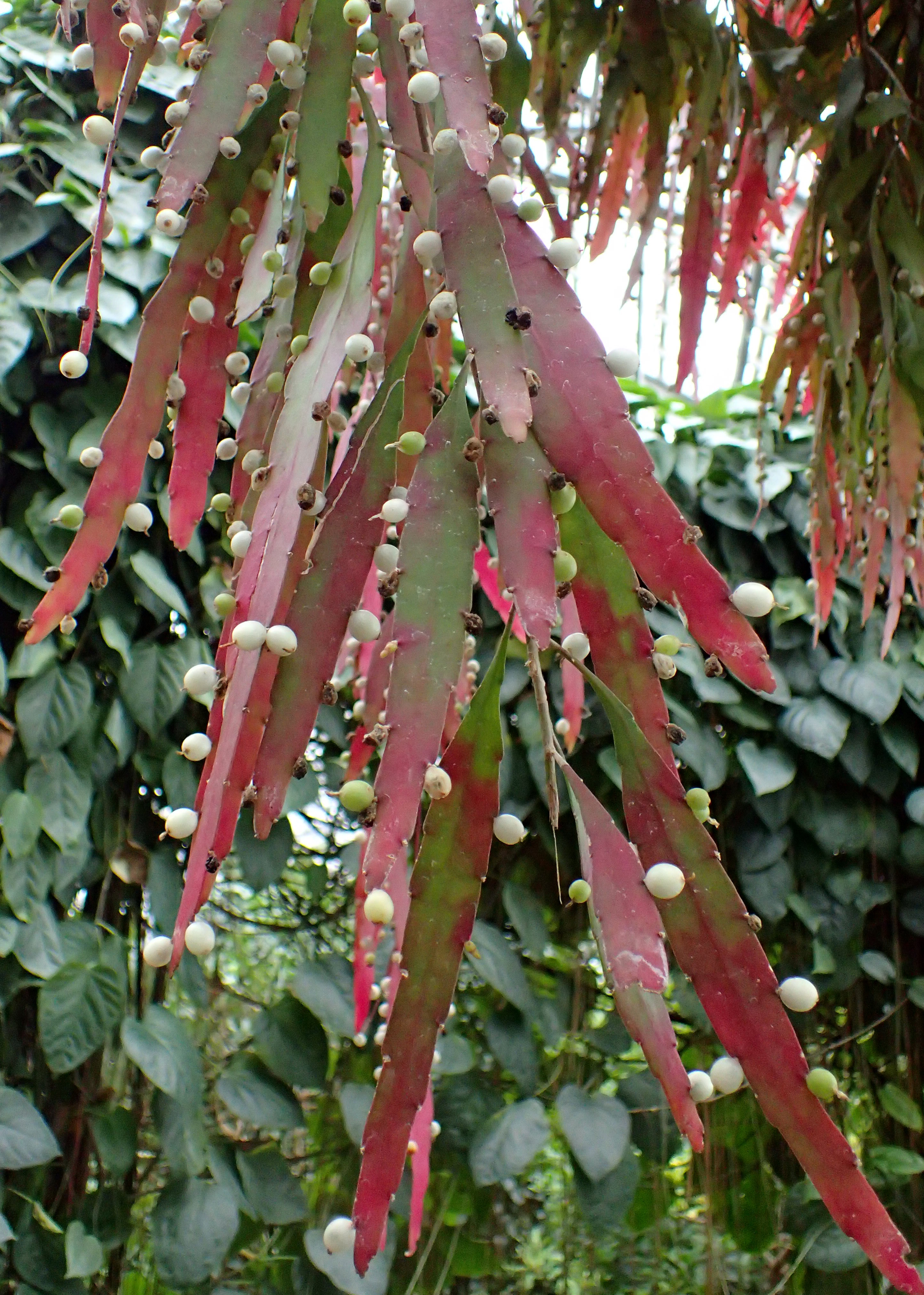
In cultivation at Garfield Park Conservatory, Chicago

== Taxonomy ==
The species was first described by Joseph zu Salm-Reifferscheidt-Dyck in 1834, as Cereus ramulosus. It was transferred to the genus Pseudorhipsalis in 1991. In 1993, Kimnach sank Pseudorhipsalis into Disocactus as section Pseudorhipsalis, so Ps. ramulosa became Disocactus ramulosus. A molecular phylogenetic study of Disocactus in 2016 did not recover Pseudorhipsalis as either embedded within or sister to Disocactus, and hence restored the genus. A molecular phylogenetic study of the tribe Hylocereeae was published in 2017. The results suggested that the genus Pseudorhipsalis was only monophyletic if Ps. ramulosa was removed. Accordingly, the authors of the study proposed a new genus, Kimnachia, with Kimnachia ramulosa as the sole species. The genus name honours Myron William Kimnach.
