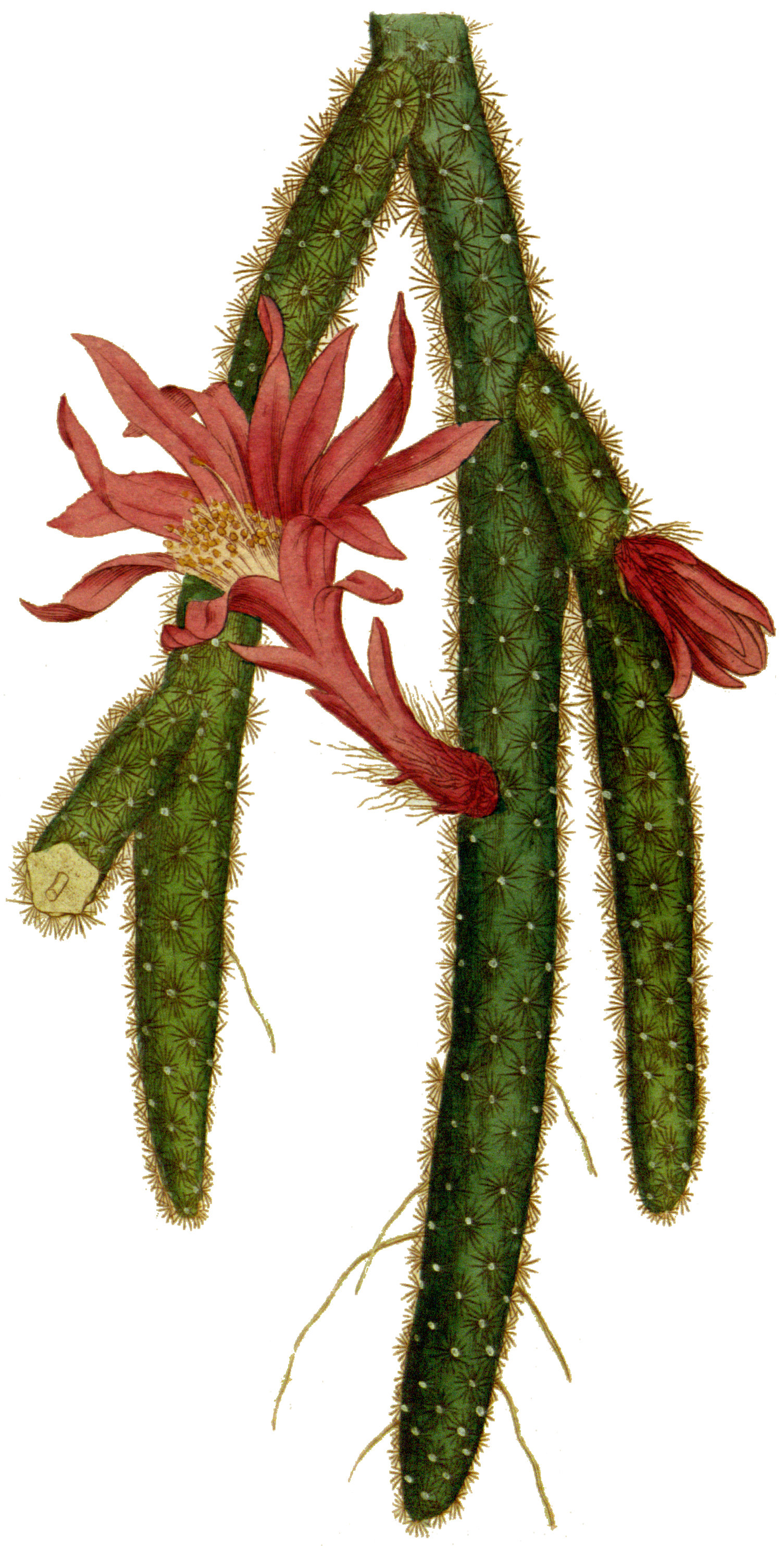
- 1787 illustration from Curtis's Botanical Magazine

Scientific classification
- Kingdom: Plantae
- Clade: Tracheophytes
- Clade: Angiosperms
- Clade: Eudicots
- Order: Caryophyllales
- Family: Cactaceae
- Subfamily: Cactoideae
- Genus: Aporocactus
- Species: A. flagelliformis

Binomial name
- Aporocactus flagelliformis (L.) Lem.

Synonyms
- Aporocactus flagelliformis var. leptophis (DC.) P.V.Heath; Aporocactus flagelliformis var. pfeifferi P.V.Heath; Aporocactus flagriformis (Zucc. ex Pfeiff.) Lem.; Aporocactus leptophis (DC.) Britton & Rose; Cactus flagelliformis L.; Cereus flagelliformis (L.) Mill.; Cereus flagelliformis var. leptophis (DC.) K.Schum.; Cereus flagelliformis var. minor Salm-Dyck; Cereus flagriformis Zucc. ex Pfeiff.; Cereus leptophis DC.; Disocactus flagelliformis (L.) Barthlott

= Aporocactus flagelliformis =

Species of cactus

Aporocactus flagelliformis (syn. Disocactus flagelliformis), the rattail cactus, is a species of flowering plant in the cactus family Cactaceae, and is the more cultivated of the two species in the genus Aporocactus. Due to its ease of cultivation and attractive floral displays, it is often grown as an ornamental potted plant.

== Description ==
Stems ascending, later prostrate or pendent, profusely branching at base, 1–2 m long or more, 8–24 mm thick; ribs 7-14, obtuse; margins ± tuberculate; areoles minute, whitish; internodes 4–8 mm; spines 8-20, 3-8 (-10) mm long, bristle-like, yellowish to brownish; epidermis green, later grayish. Flowers zygomorphic, 7–10 cm long, 2-4 (-7,5) cm wide, limb bilaterally symmetric, oblique, diurnal, open for 3–5 days, scentless; pericarpel greenish with acute bracteoles; receptacle 3 cm, long, curved just above pericarpel, bracteoles, brownish, acute; outer tepals linear-lanceolate, ± reflexed, 2–3 cm long, 6 mm wide, crimson; inner tepals narrowly oblong, to 10 mm wide, crimson, sometimes passing to pink along the margins; stamens white to pale pink, erect, exserted; style stigma lobes 5-7, white Fruit globose, 10–12 mm long, red, bristly, pulp yellowish; seeds ovoid, brownish red.

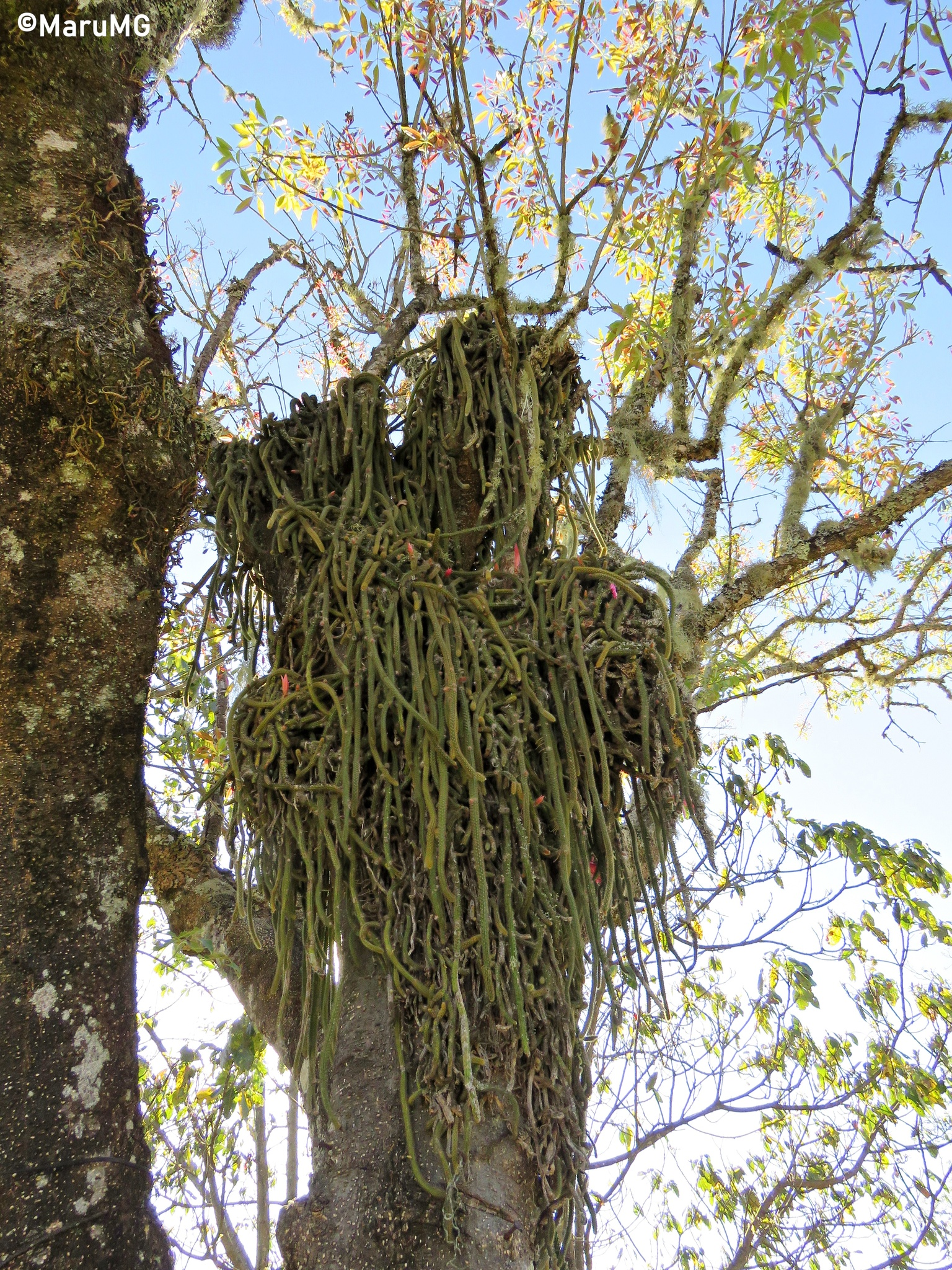
Growing wild in Mexico

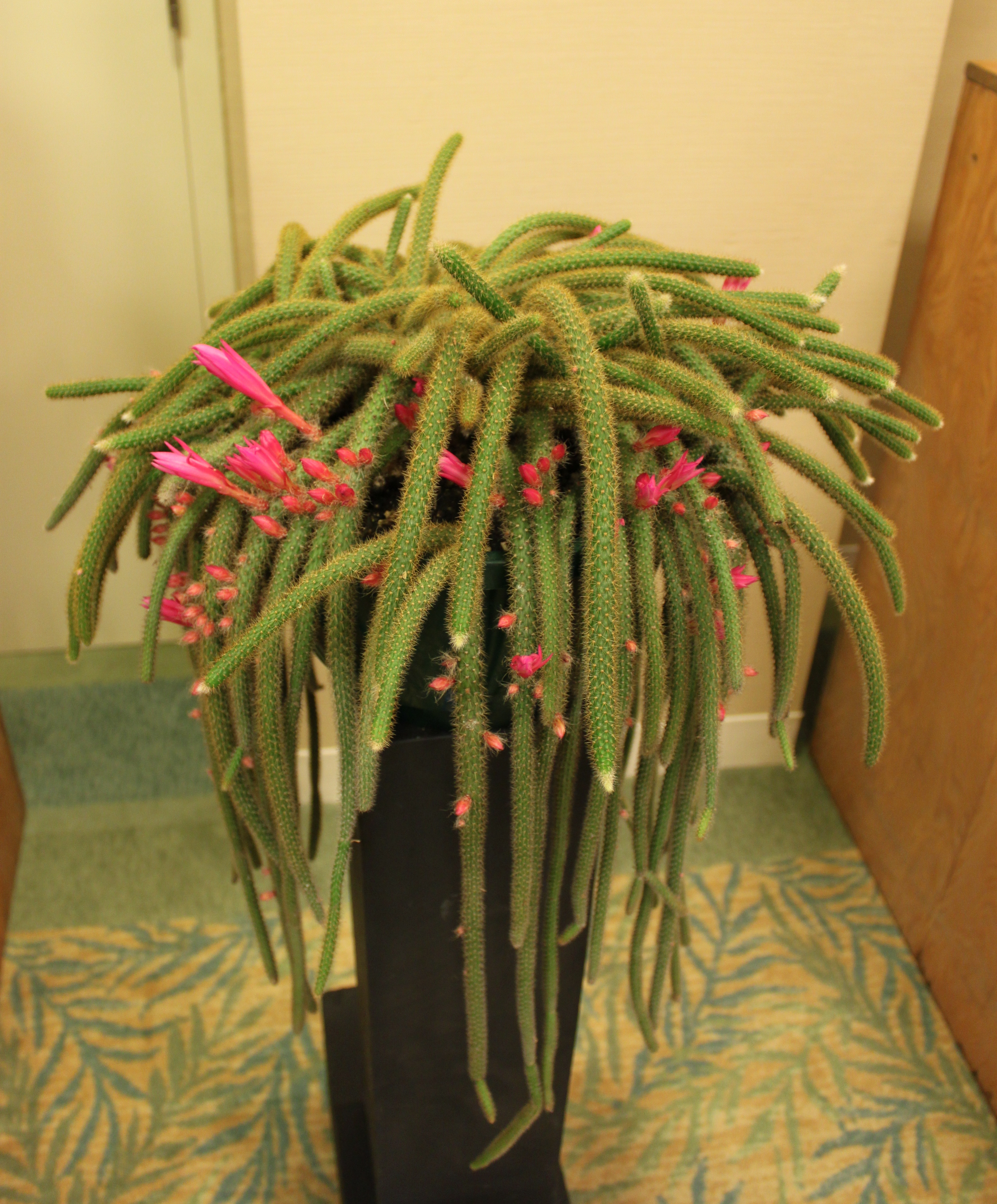
As a houseplant

== Taxonomy ==
Aporocactus used to be a subgenus in Disocactus, but according to molecular evidence, it should be excluded from Disocactus and form a genus on its own. Therefore, the correct scientific name of this species is Aporocactus flagelliformis.

== Etymology ==
The Latin specific epithet flagelliformis means "shaped like a whip", in reference to the long shoots. The common name "rattail" refers to the same feature.

== History ==
One of the first cacti to be introduced into European culture. Watson (1898) offers the year 1690 but probably earlier. This has always been one of the most popular cacti in cultivation. Still almost nothing is known about its natural habit.

== Origin and habitat ==
Mexico: Hidalgo. Dry forests. Lithophytic or epiphytic in dry forests. Seems rare and seldom collected in the field.

== Cultivation ==
Rattail cacti are very easy to grow, being suitable for a greenhouse and container, indoors or out. These plants need a minimum temperature of 6 °C (43 °F). They should be grown in bright, indirect light, in a fairly rich potting mix. The best compost consists of four parts sandy loam, and one part of equal quantities of sand and crushed brick. They should be repotted every other year because their soil tends to sour. This does not mean, however, that they will need larger pots. Once the plants are established, the compost should be kept moist from April to October; less water is required from November until March, just enough to keep the stems from dying back. In the winter, old or discolored stems may be cut out at the base to encourage new growth.

This plant is a recipient of the Royal Horticultural Society's Award of Garden Merit.
