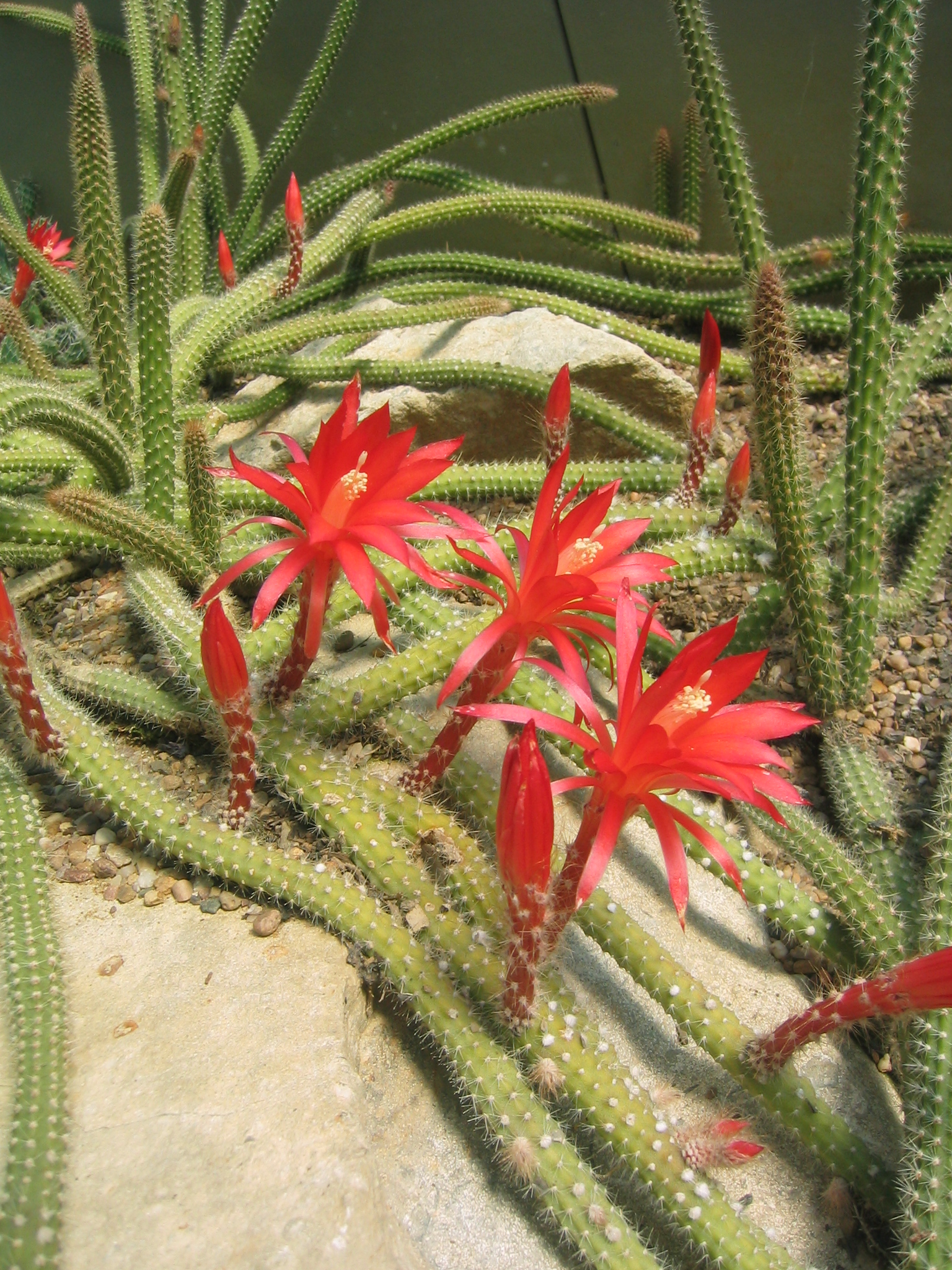

Conservation status
- Near Threatened (IUCN 3.1)
- CITES Appendix II (CITES)

Scientific classification
- Kingdom: Plantae
- Clade: Tracheophytes
- Clade: Angiosperms
- Clade: Eudicots
- Order: Caryophyllales
- Family: Cactaceae
- Subfamily: Cactoideae
- Genus: Aporocactus
- Species: A. martianus

Binomial name
- Aporocactus martianus (Zucc. ex Pfeiff.) Britton & Rose

Synonyms
- Cereus martianus Zucc. ex Pfeiff.; Cereaster martianus (Zucc. ex Pfeiff.) F.Berge; Cereus martini Dupuis; Eriocereus martianus (Zucc. ex Pfeiff.) Riccob.; Aporocactus conzattii Britton & Rose; Cereus conzattii (Britton & Rose) A.Berger; Disocactus martianus (Zucc. ex Pfeiff.) Barthlott; Aporocactus martianus var. conzattii (Britton & Rose) P.V.Heath

= Aporocactus martianus =

Species of cactus

Aporocactus martianus (syn. Disocactus martianus) is a species of cactus found in Oaxaca, Mexico.

== Distribution and habitat ==
A. martianus grows only in Oaxaca, Mexico, in cloud forests and oak forests at elevations of 1,500–2,200 m (4,900–7,200 ft). It is locally abundant within its range.

== Description ==
Disocactus martianus grows creeping, occasionally forming lithophytic with aerial roots. It is a species of fleshy, cylindrical suspended or creeping cactus with stems up to 1.5 meters long and up to 2.5 centimeters thick, sometimes with aerial roots, with 8 to 10 slightly wart-shaped ribs; 3 or 4 central pale brown spines up to 12 mm long and 6 to 20 radial spines are light yellowish and only 5 to 7 millimeters long. The bright red flowers are diurnal and produced in summer, 10 to 12 centimeters in diameter and a length of 5 to 7 centimeters. The flowers stay open for a couple of days. They are followed by globose fruits of green color and 2 cm in diameter. It is viviparous.

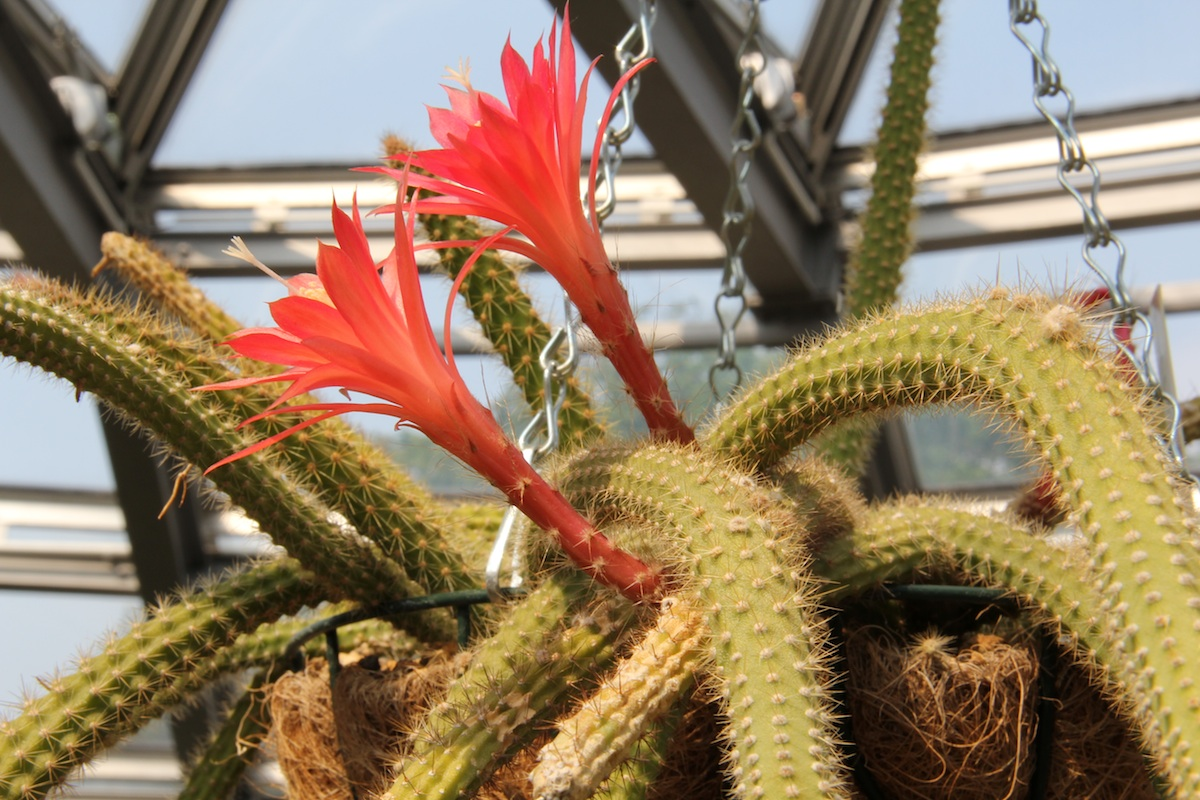
Flowers side

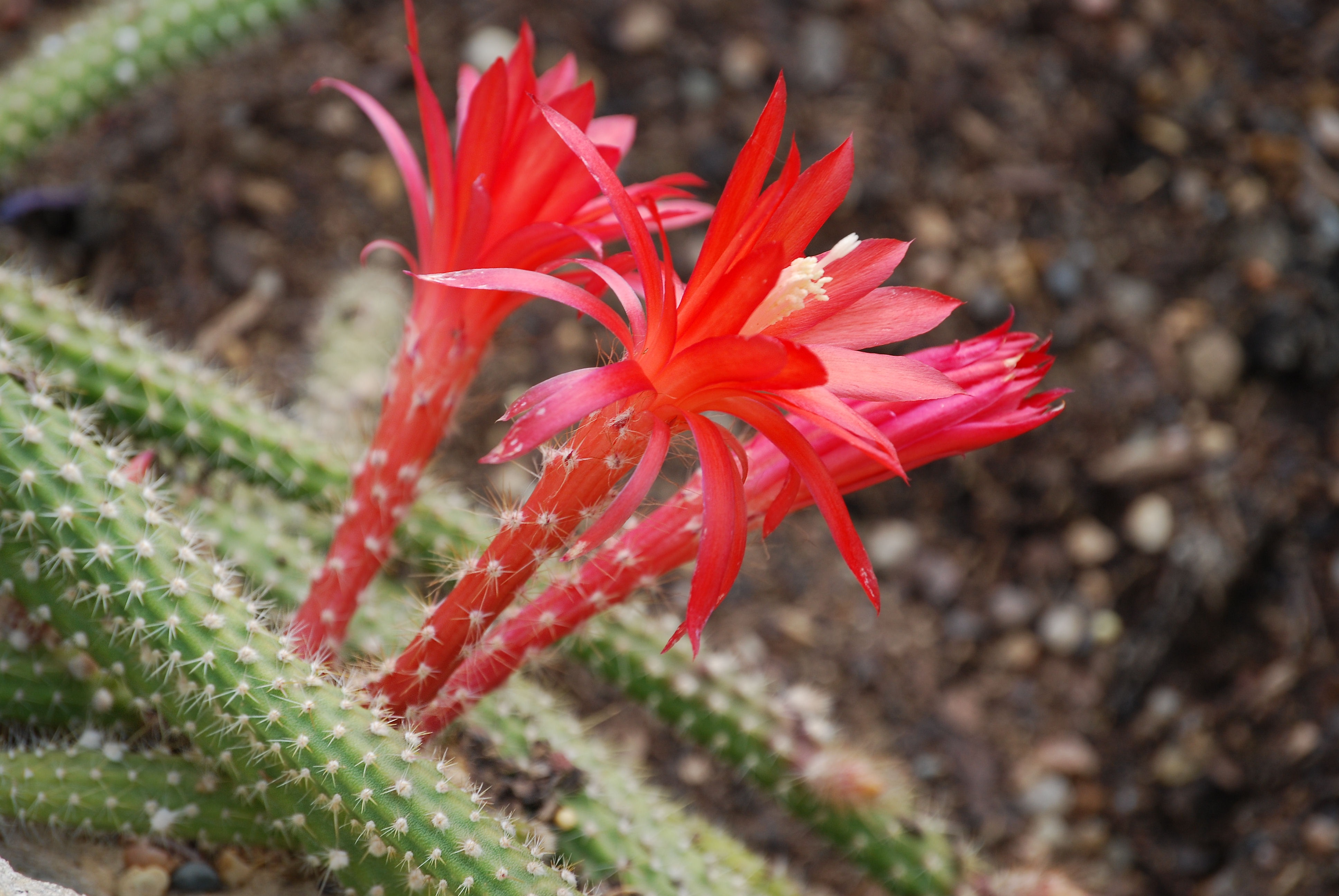
Flowers

== Taxonomy & systematics ==
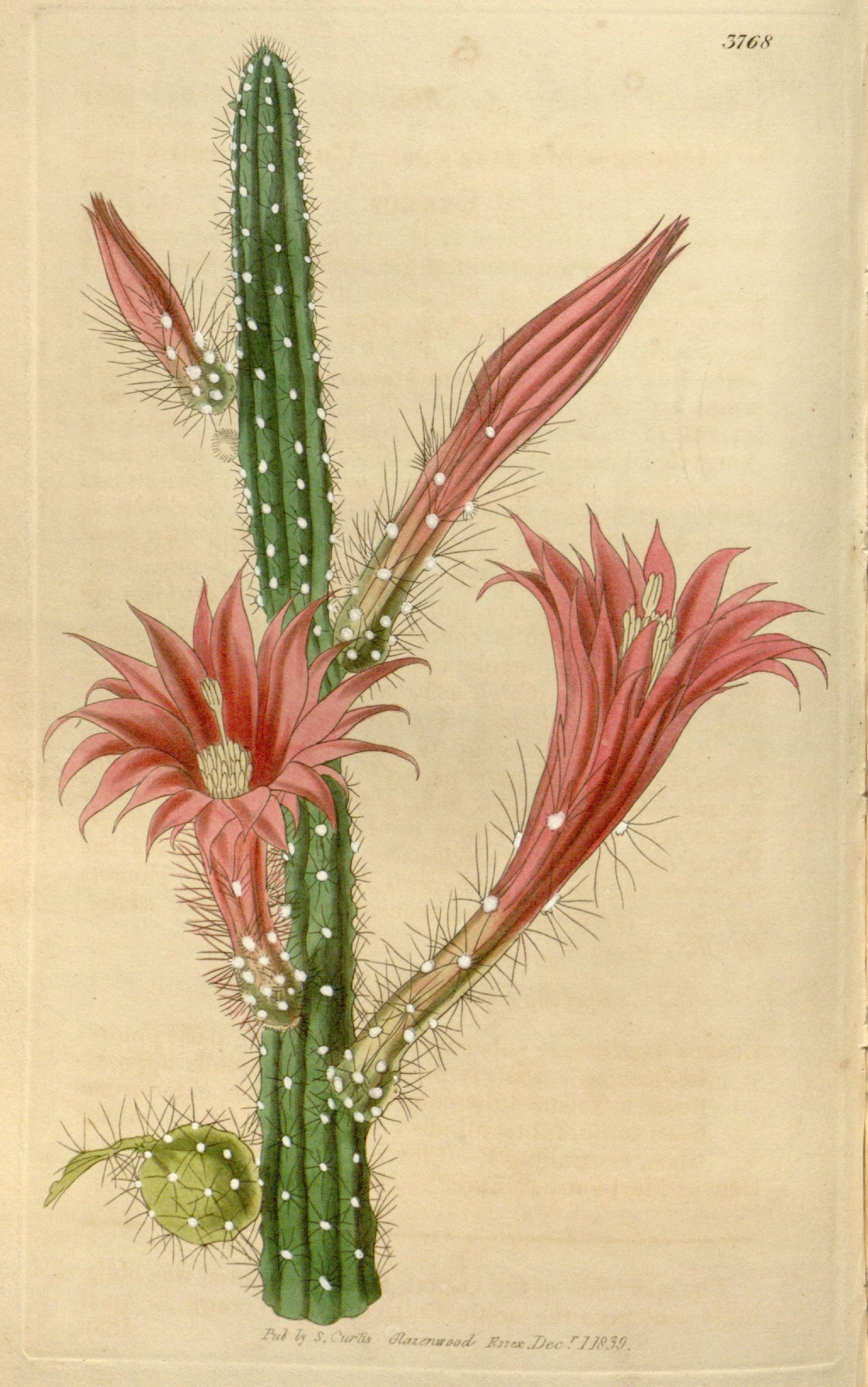
Plate 3768 of Aporocactus martianus from Curtis's Botanical Magazine 1840

It was first described as Cereus martianus in 1837 by Ludwig Georg Karl Pfeiffer. Wilhelm Barthlott moved the species to Disocactus in 1991 The following species and varieties are synonyms:

- Cereus martianus Zucc. (1832),
- Eriocereus martianus Riccob. (1909),
- Aporocactus martianus Britton & Rose (1920),
- Aporocactus conzattii Britton & Rose (1920),
- Cereus conzattii (Britton & Rose) A. Berger (1929)
- Aporocactus martianus var. Conzattii (Britton & Rose) PVHeath (1992).

In their synopsis of the tribe Hylocereeae from 2017, Nadja Korotkova, Thomas Borsch and Salvador Arias interpret the species as a synonym of Aporocactus martianus.
