= Leucostele undulosa =

Scientific classification
- Kingdom: Plantae
- Clade: Tracheophytes
- Clade: Angiosperms
- Clade: Eudicots
- Order: Caryophyllales
- Family: Cactaceae
- Subfamily: Cactoideae
- Genus: Leucostele
- Species: L. undulosa

Binomial name
- Leucostele undulosa (Albesiano) Schlumpb.

Synonyms
- Trichocereus undulosus Albesiano 2012

Species of cactus

Leucostele undulosa is a species of Leucostele found in Chile.

== Description ==
Leucostele undulosa has a columnar growth habit, achieving a height of up to 2.5 meters (8 ft 2 in) and a trunk diameter of 11 centimeters (4.3 in). Its dark green branches, measuring 15 centimeters in diameter, feature stems with 20 ribs and obovate gray areoles, each 2 mm (0.079 in) high and 8 mm (0.31 in) in diameter. Within these areoles, 3-4 central spines, measuring 4 cm (1.6 in) in length, exhibit a white hue with brown markings, accompanied by 12 radial spines measuring 1 cm (0.39 in) in length, displaying a spectrum from dark green to white with brown spots.

This plant produces 3–10 subapical white flowers, measuring 13 cm (5.1 in) in length and 6 cm (2.4 in) in diameter. The green fruits, 3 cm (1.2 in) in diameter and 2.5 cm (0.98 in) long, feature abundant axillary gray hairs. Notably, Leucostele undulosa is similar to Leucostele skottsbergii but stands out with its darker green branches, more ribs, a thicker and different color spines.

== Distribution ==
Indigenous to Coquimbo, Chile, this species is found at altitudes of 400 meters (1,300 ft), specifically in low scrub areas and on rocks alongside Puya species.

== Taxonomy ==
The nomenclature of this species is based on the undulating shape of its ribs, producing a tuberculate appearance.
