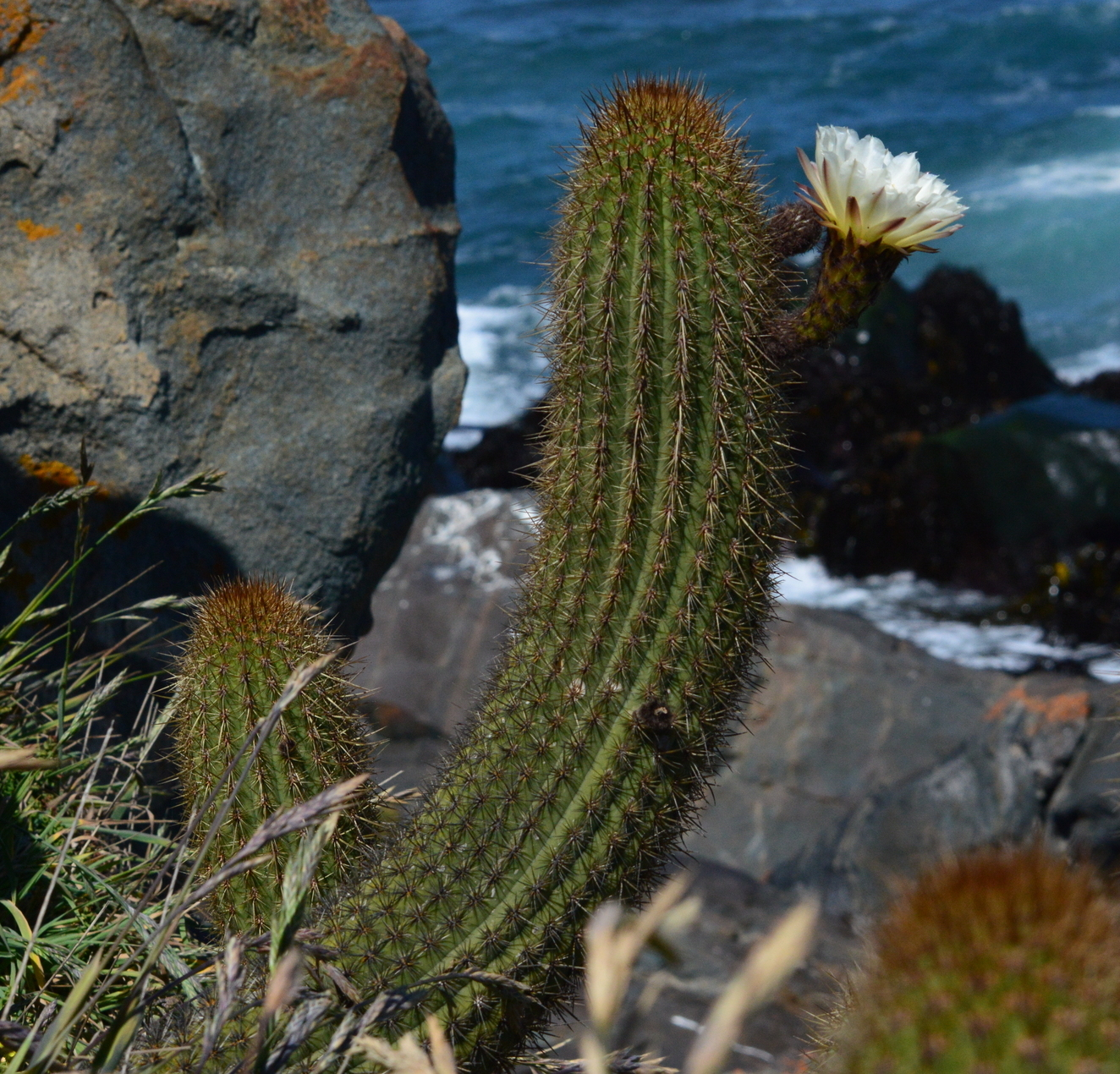

Conservation status
- Endangered (IUCN 3.1)

Scientific classification
- Kingdom: Plantae
- Clade: Embryophytes
- Clade: Tracheophytes
- Clade: Spermatophytes
- Clade: Angiosperms
- Clade: Eudicots
- Order: Caryophyllales
- Family: Cactaceae
- Subfamily: Cactoideae
- Genus: Leucostele
- Species: L. bolligeriana

Binomial name
- Leucostele bolligeriana (Mächler & Helmut Walter) Schlumpb.

Synonyms
- Echinopsis bolligeriana Mächler & Helmut Walter 2003; Trichocereus bolligerianus (Mächler & Helmut Walter) Albesiano 2012; Trichocereus chiloensis var. conjugens F.Ritter 1980

= Leucostele bolligeriana =

Species of cactus

Leucostele bolligeriana is a species of cactus found in Chile.

== Description ==
Leucostele bolligeriana is a cactus that grows 2 to 6 meters tall, branching from the base. Its stems can stand upright or hang down and reach up to 18 cm in diameter. The upper parts of the stems have about 17 broad, rounded ribs, each 0.6 to 2 cm wide and about 3 mm high. Along these ribs are ovate areoles approximately 2 mm high and 6 to 8 mm wide, which have yellow hairs at the top and gray or black bases. Each areole produces 1 to 4 central spines, ranging from 0.3 to 2 cm in length. These spines are light green at the base, turning brown toward the middle and tip. Additionally, each areole has around 16 radial spines, 0.5 to 2 cm long, with light gray or green bases, green middle sections, and brown tips.

On the lower parts of the stems, up to 20 broader ribs may develop, each about 2 cm wide and 1 cm high. The ovate areoles here are about 2 mm high and 6 mm wide, with gray or brown hairs. These produce 4 to 6 central spines, 0.2 to 6 cm long, which are olive green or dark brown and less than 0.7 mm thick. There are also up to 15 flexible radial spines, 1 to 2 cm long and less than 0.7 mm thick, colored olive green or light gray.

The cactus’s flowers are located just below the stem's apex, either alone or in groups of up to three. They are approximately 14 cm long, with the ovary and floral tube covered in dense brown hairs. When fully open, the flowers have a diameter of about 7 cm. The ovary is 2 to 3 cm wide. Floral scales on the pericarpel are up to 2 cm long, green with brown tips; those on the floral tube are up to 3 cm long, green or yellowish-green with brown tips. The tepals are 4 to 6 cm long, greenish-yellow or yellowish-white, with brown longitudinal lines. The green style is about 8 cm long, with yellow stigma lobes around 1.5 cm in size.

The fruit is small, measuring 2 to 3 cm long and 3 to 4 cm in diameter. It has numerous triangular scales and dense brown and gray hairs in the axils. Seeds are approximately 1.8 mm long and 1 mm wide.

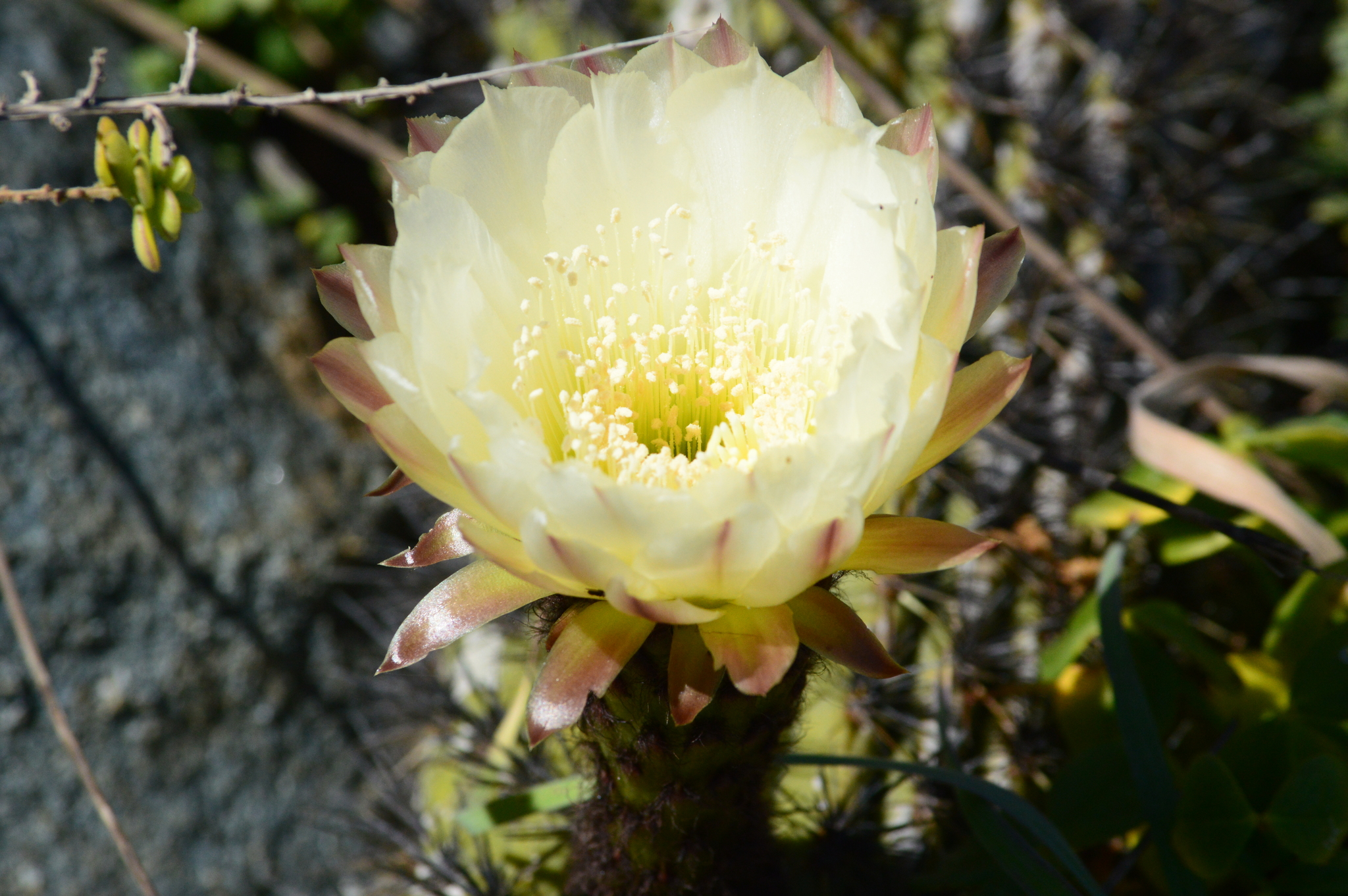
Flower

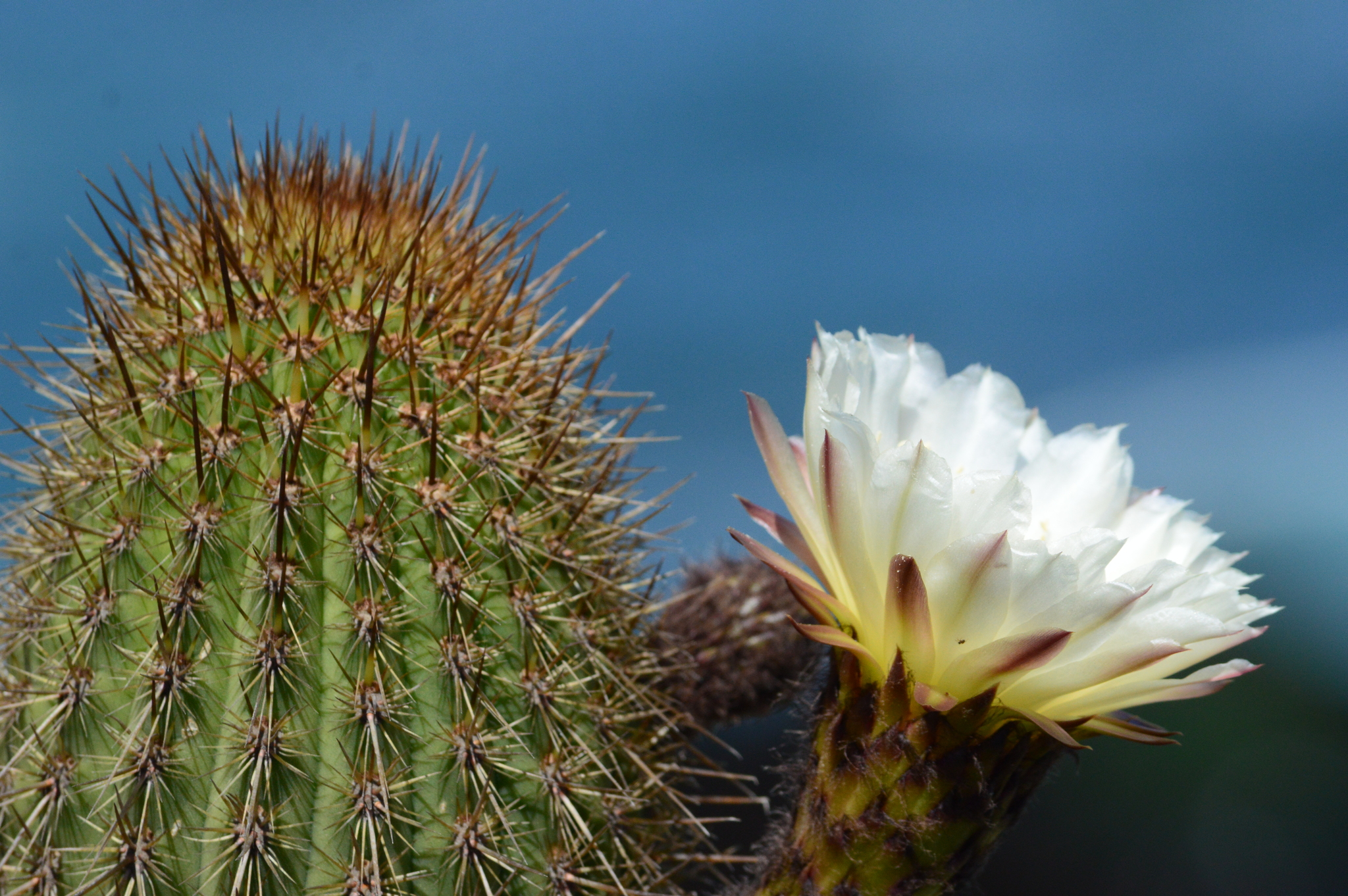
Spines

== Distribution ==
This plant is native to the hills of the Coastal Cordillera in Cardenal Caro, growing in proximity to the sea and on steep slopes.

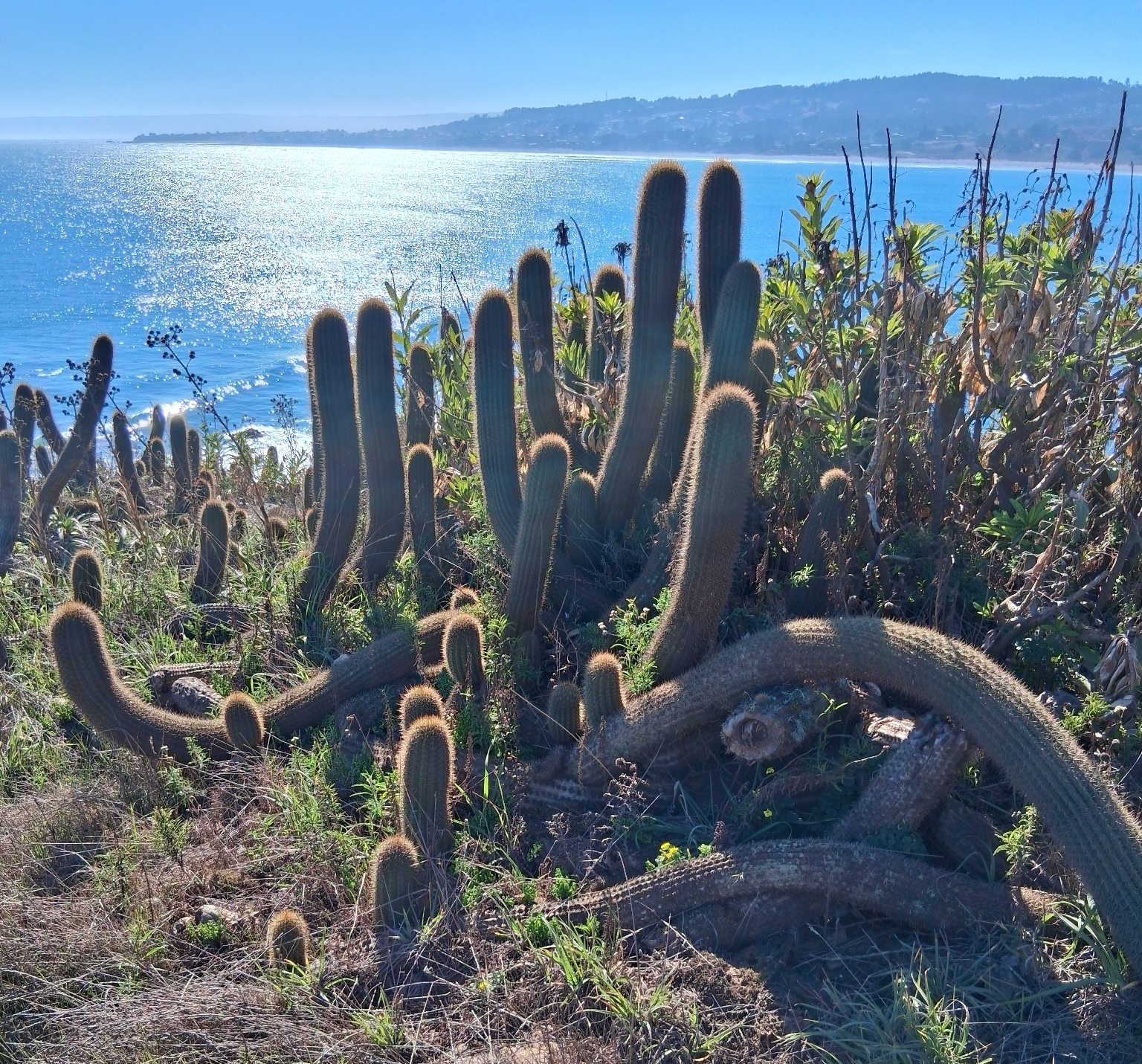
Habitat in Pichilemu, Chile

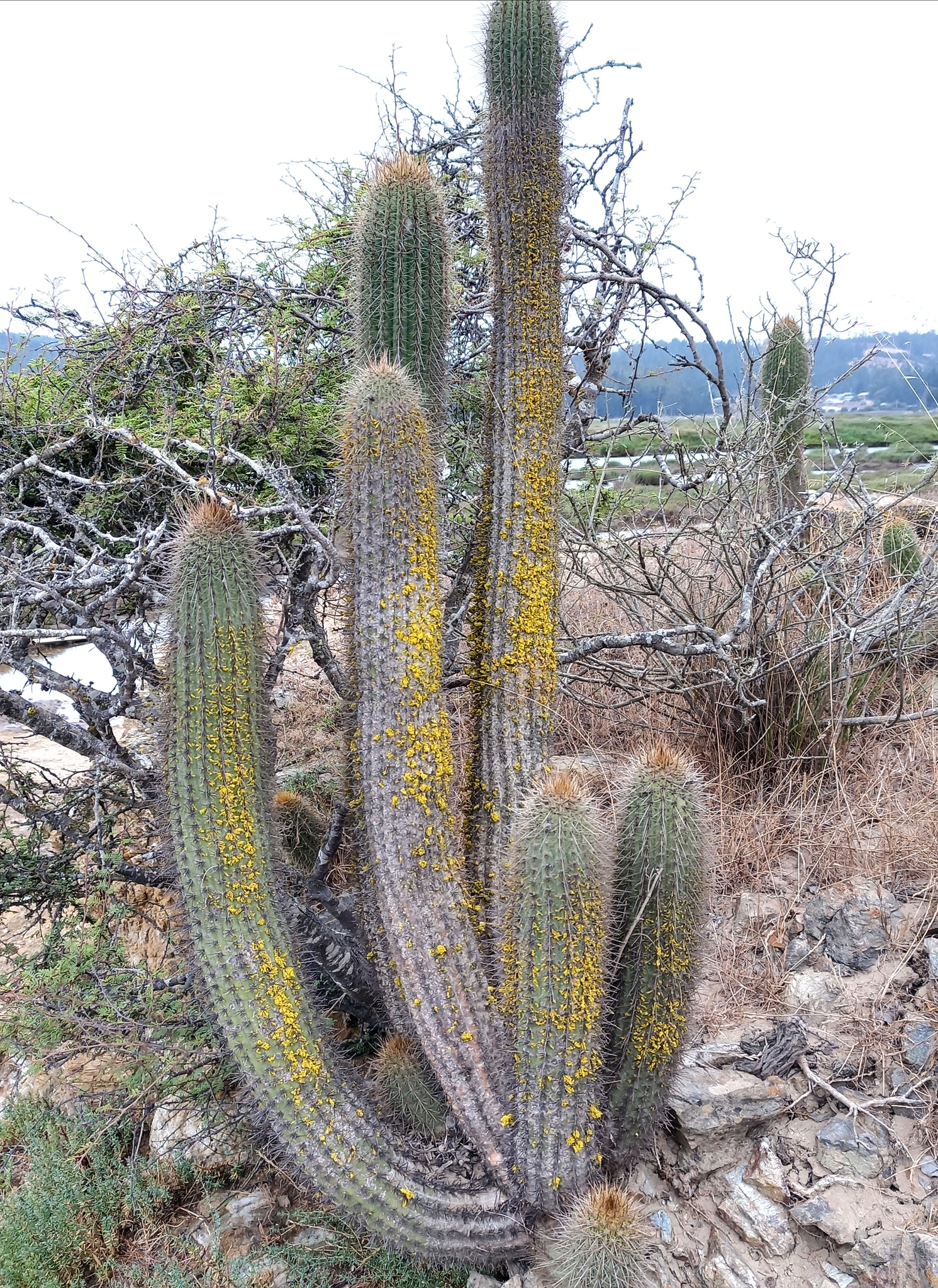
Plant with Trentepohlia aurea in Pichilemu, Chile

== Taxonomy ==
Initially collected in Punta de Lobos in 2003 by Helmut Walter and classified as Echinopsis bolligeriana, the species was named in honor of Dr. Thomas Bolliger, a cactus curator in Zurich. In 2012, Albesiano identified Trichocereus chiloensis var. conjungens as a synonym, based on similarities in rib and spine morphology. In 2012, Boris O. Schlumpberger reclassified the species into the genus Leucostele.
