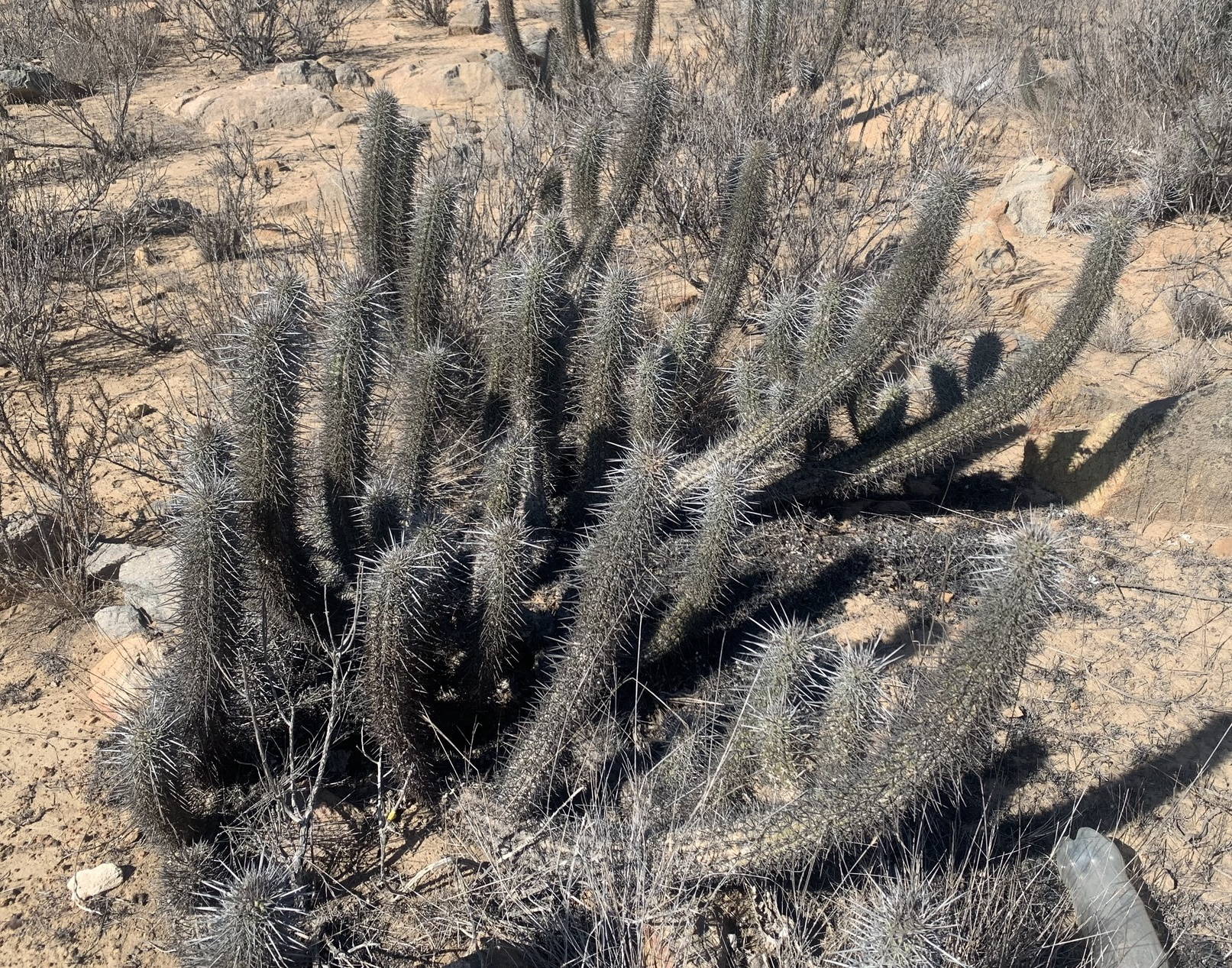

Scientific classification
- Kingdom: Plantae
- Clade: Embryophytes
- Clade: Tracheophytes
- Clade: Spermatophytes
- Clade: Angiosperms
- Clade: Eudicots
- Order: Caryophyllales
- Family: Cactaceae
- Subfamily: Cactoideae
- Genus: Leucostele
- Species: L. nigripilis

Binomial name
- Leucostele nigripilis (Phil.) P.C.Guerrero & Helmut Walter

Synonyms
- Cereus nigripilis Phil. 1860; Echinopsis nigripilis (Phil.) H.Friedrich & G.D.Rowley 1974; Trichocereus chiloensis var. nigripilis (Phil.) Espinosa 1937; Trichocereus coquimbanus var. nigripilis (Phil.) Borg 1951; Trichocereus nigripilis (Phil.) Backeb. 1937; Cactus coquimbanus Molina 1782; Cereus panoploeatus Monv. 1839; Cereus spinibarbis var. flavidus Labour. 1853; Cereus spinibarbis var. minor Monv. ex Labour. 1853; Cereus spinibarbis var. purpureus Monv. ex Labour. 1853; Echinopsis coquimbana (Molina) H.Friedrich & G.D.Rowley 1974; Eulychnia coquimbana (Molina) Albesiano 2012; Leucostele coquimbana (Molina) Schlumpb. 2012; Trichocereus coquimbanus (Molina) Britton & Rose 1920

= Leucostele nigripilis =

Species of cactus

Leucostele nigripilis is a species of Leucostele found in Chile.

== Description ==
Leucostele nigripilis is a shrubby, dense, low-growing cactus that can reach up to 1.2 meters in height. It has cylindrical stems that slightly arch and measure 5 to 7 centimeters in diameter. The upper part of the stems features about 11 ribs that are rounded, obtuse, approximately 1 centimeter wide and high, with undulating furrows. Along these ribs, rounded areoles about 3 millimeters high and 7 millimeters wide are arranged, with brown hairs on top and gray hairs underneath. Each areole produces straight, needle-like spines. There are four prominent central spines that are black, similar in color to the subapical spines, about 2 millimeters thick, and up to 5 centimeters long. Additionally, there are up to 13 radial spines, also black, approximately 0.5 millimeters in diameter, ranging from 0.7 to 2 centimeters in length. In the basal section of the stems, there are about 10 ribs that are rounded, obtuse, approximately 1 centimeter wide and 8 millimeters high. The areoles here are rounded, about 5 millimeters high and 8 millimeters wide, with dark gray hairs. Each produces four needle-like central spines that are about 1.5 millimeters thick and up to 6 centimeters long, light gray with black tips. Up to 12 radial spines, light gray in color, are about 0.5 millimeters in diameter and roughly 1 centimeter long. The flowers are approximately 13 centimeters long with ovary and floral tube are densely covered with black hairs. The stigma lobes are erect and measure 1 to 2 centimeters in length. The fruits are about 3.5 centimeters long. The seeds are roughly 1.5 millimeters long and 1 millimeter wide.

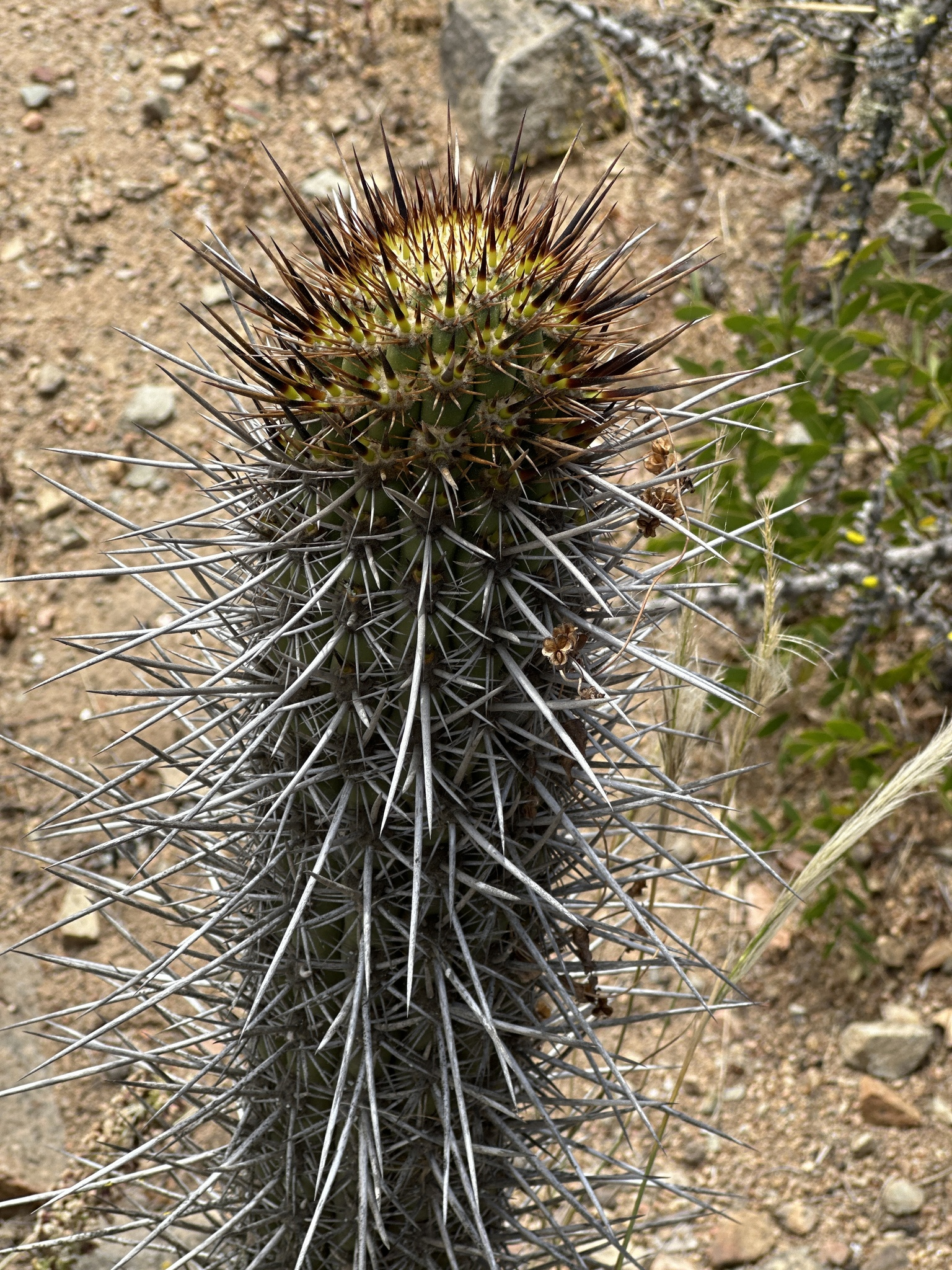
Stem

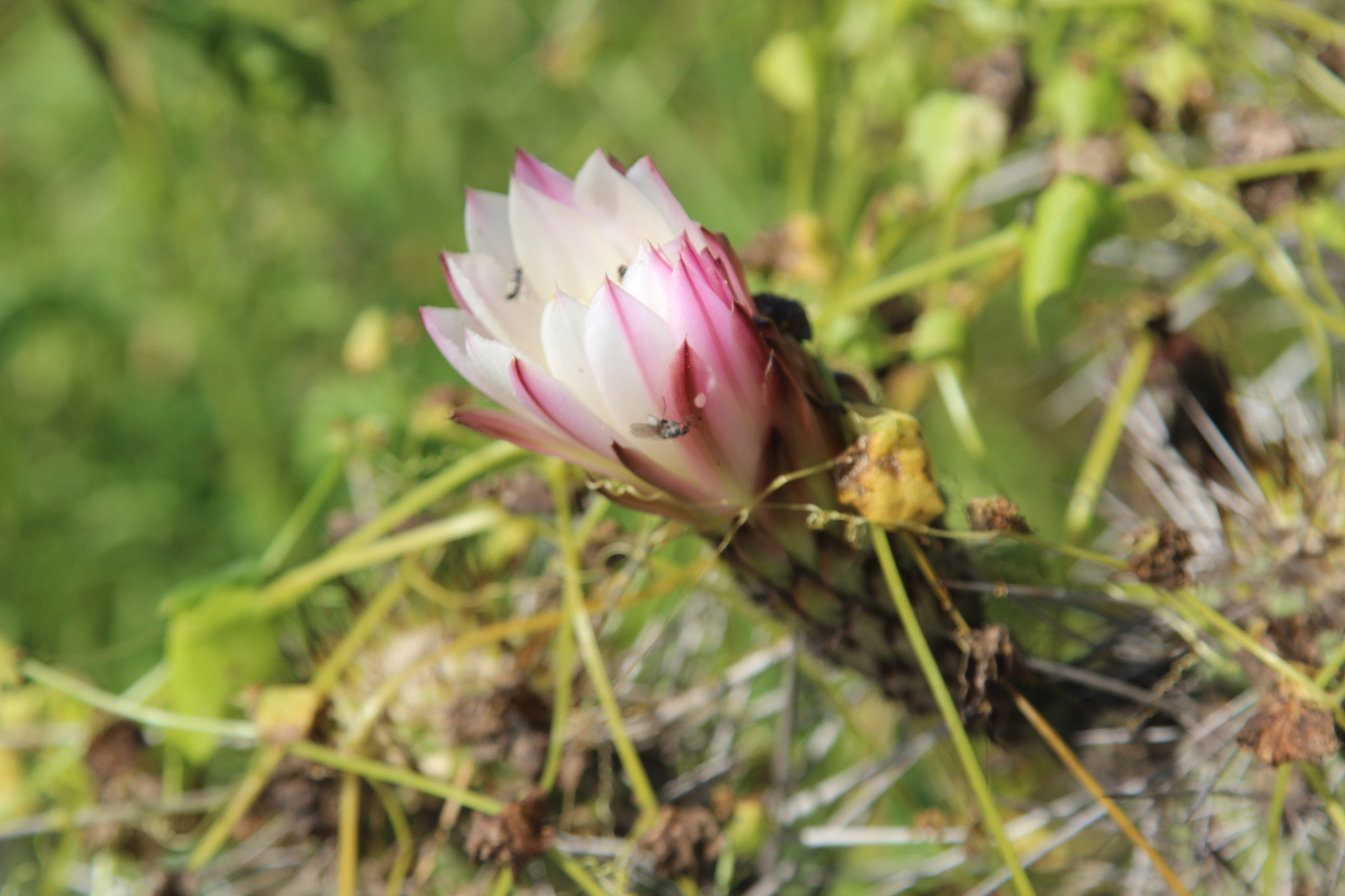
Flower bud

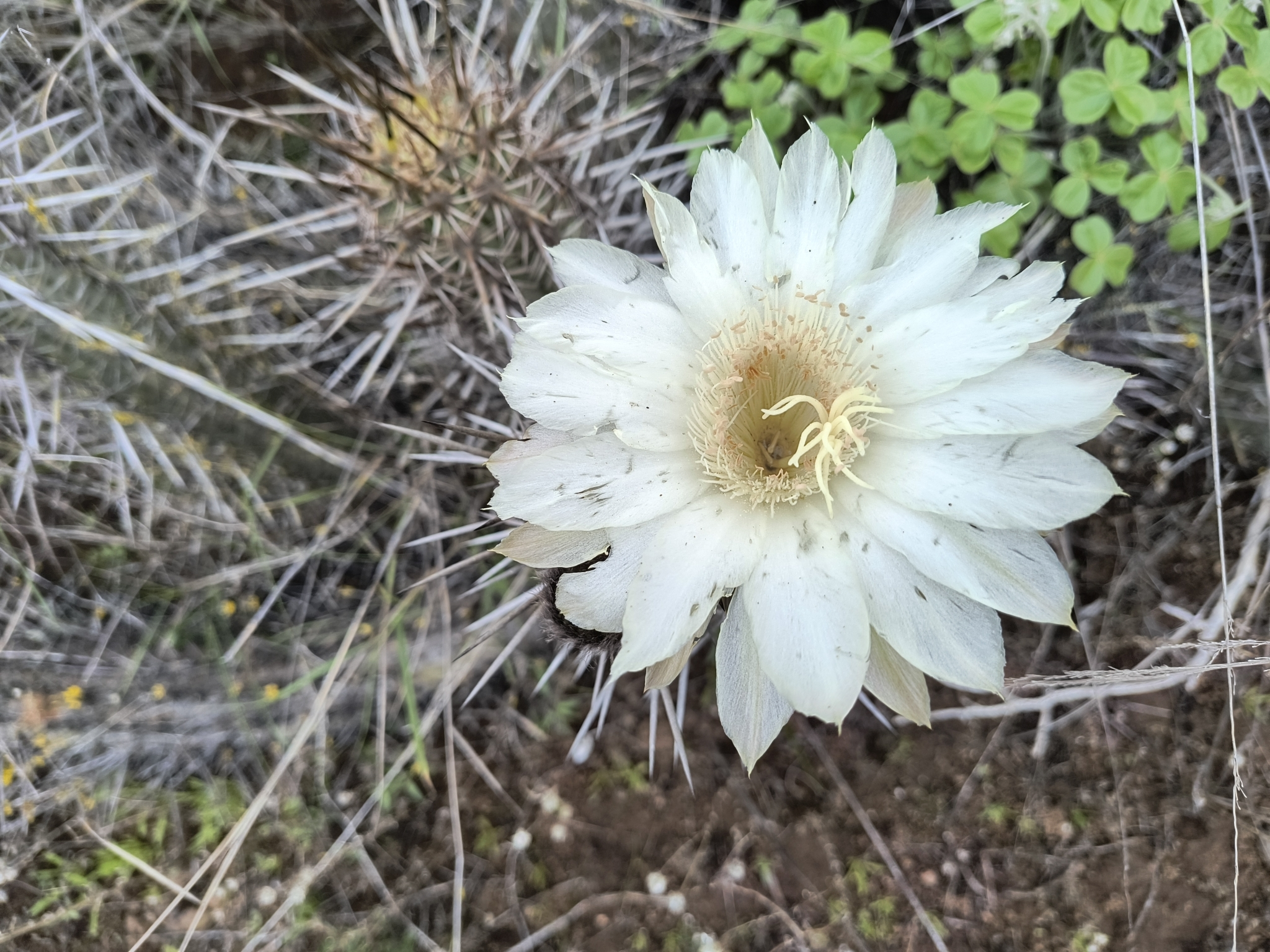
Flower

== Distribution ==
This species is found in Region III of Atacama and Region IV of Coquimbo, at elevations ranging from sea level to 700 meters.

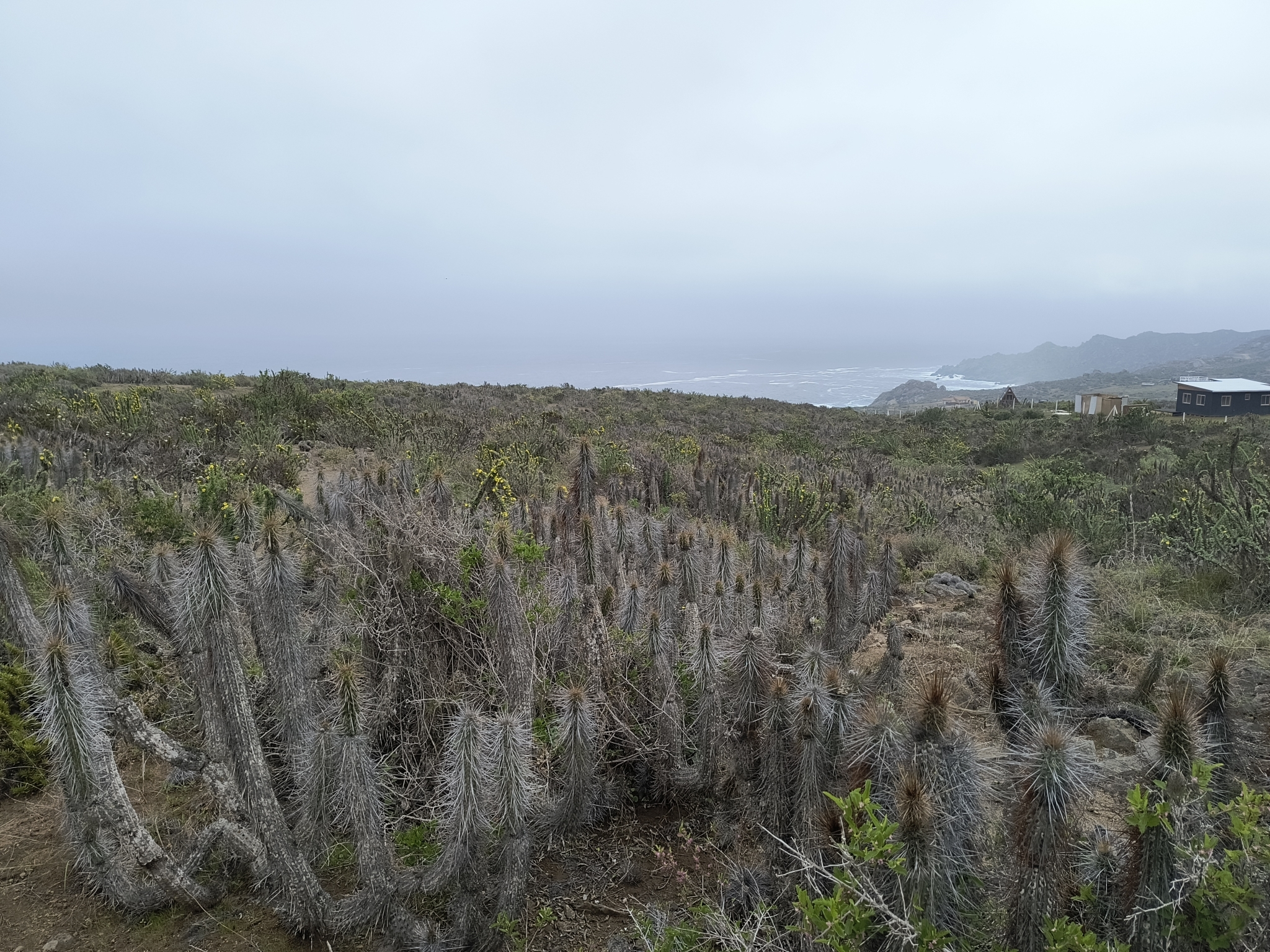
Habitat near La Serena, Chile

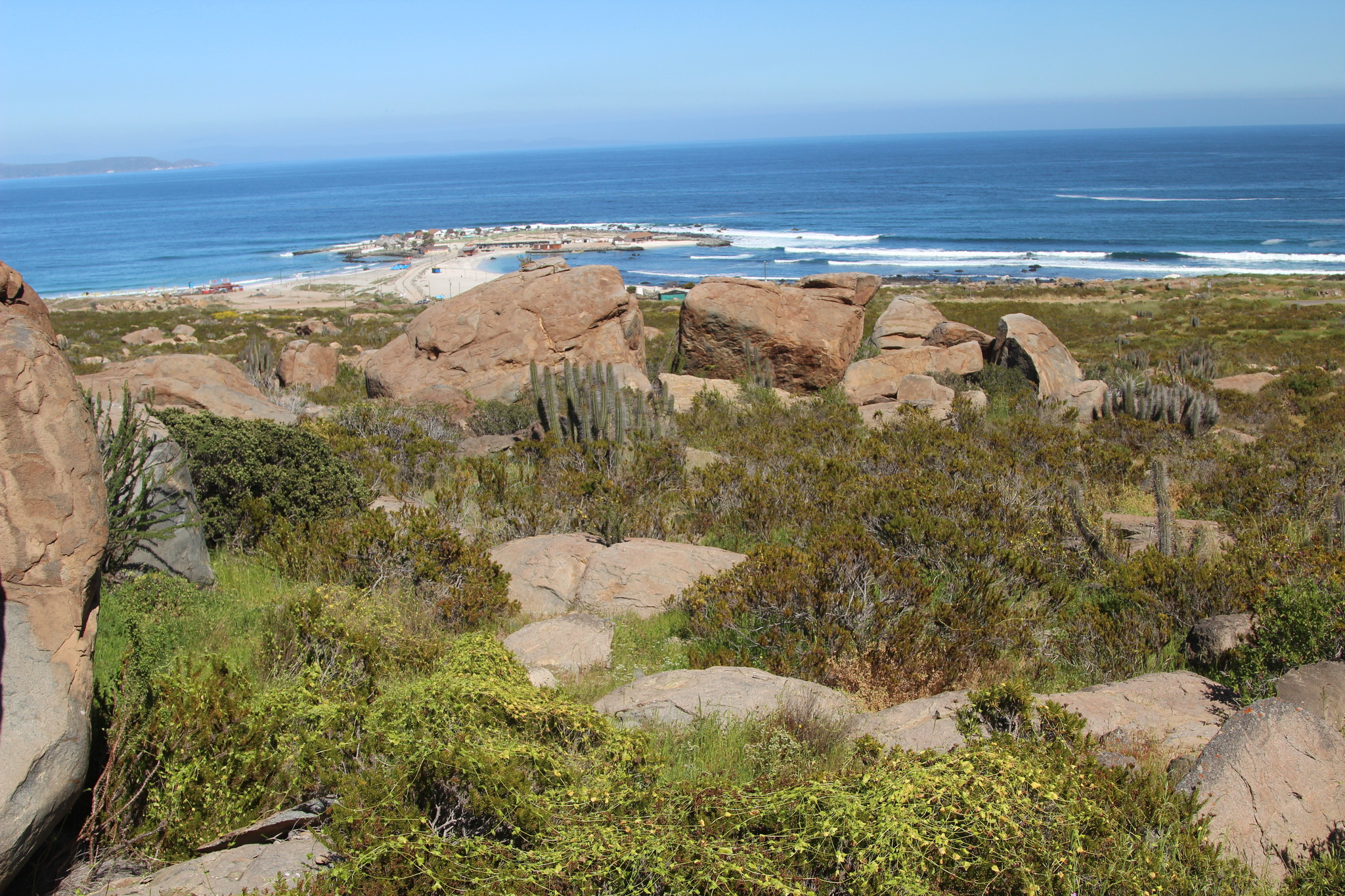
Habitat in Coquimbo, Chile

== Taxonomy ==
This species was first described as Cactus coquimbanus in 1782 and later change to Cereus nigripilis in 1860. The specific epithet nigripilis comes from Latin, means 'black hairs' and refers to the black hairs from the areoles.
