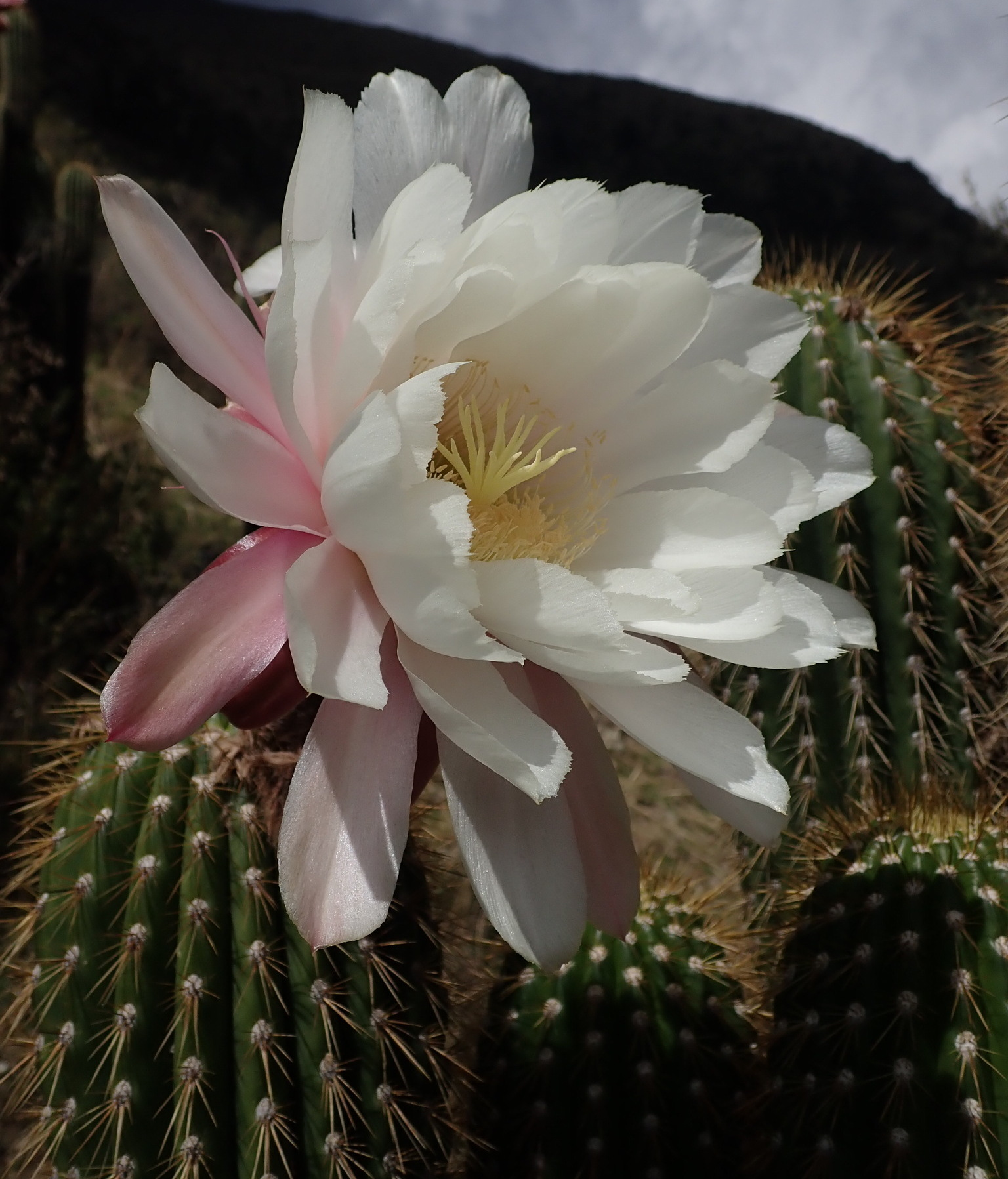

Conservation status
- Least Concern (IUCN 3.1)

Scientific classification
- Kingdom: Plantae
- Clade: Embryophytes
- Clade: Tracheophytes
- Clade: Spermatophytes
- Clade: Angiosperms
- Clade: Eudicots
- Order: Caryophyllales
- Family: Cactaceae
- Subfamily: Cactoideae
- Genus: Leucostele
- Species: L. tunariensis

Binomial name
- Leucostele tunariensis (Cárdenas) Schlumpb.

Synonyms
- Echinopsis tunariensis (Cárdenas) H.Friedrich & G.D.Rowley 1974; Trichocereus tunariensis Cárdenas 1959

= Leucostele tunariensis =

Species of cactus

Leucostele tunariensis is a species of columnar cactus native to South America.

== Description ==
Leucostele tunariensis exhibits a columnar growth pattern, branching from the base and attaining heights between 2 and 3 meters. The green shoots are club-shaped to cylindrical, with a diameter of up to 12 centimeters and 16 to 21 sharp-edged ribs. Gray oval areoles, spaced about 1 centimeter apart, decorate these ribs, each bearing approximately 17 spines ranging from 0.5 to 6 centimeters. Notably, these spines lack differentiation into central and peripheral categories, with some pointing downwards.

The plant produces funnel-shaped, pink to red flowers near the shoot tips that bloom at night. These flowers measure 15 to 17 centimeters in length and have a diameter ranging from 12 to 15 centimeters. Another distinctive feature is the spherical, green fruits, with a diameter of 5 centimeters and a length of up to 4 centimeters.

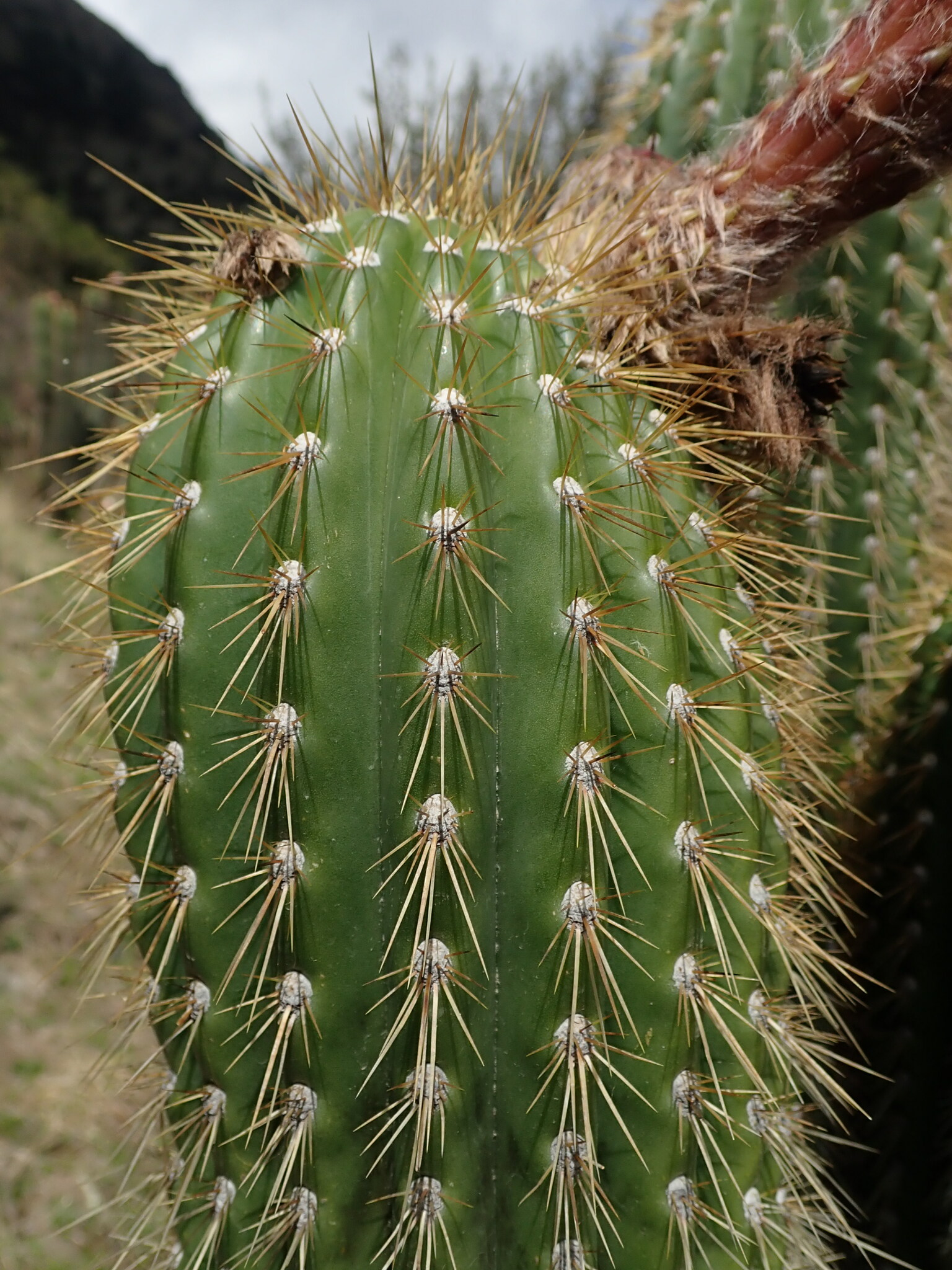
Closeup of spines

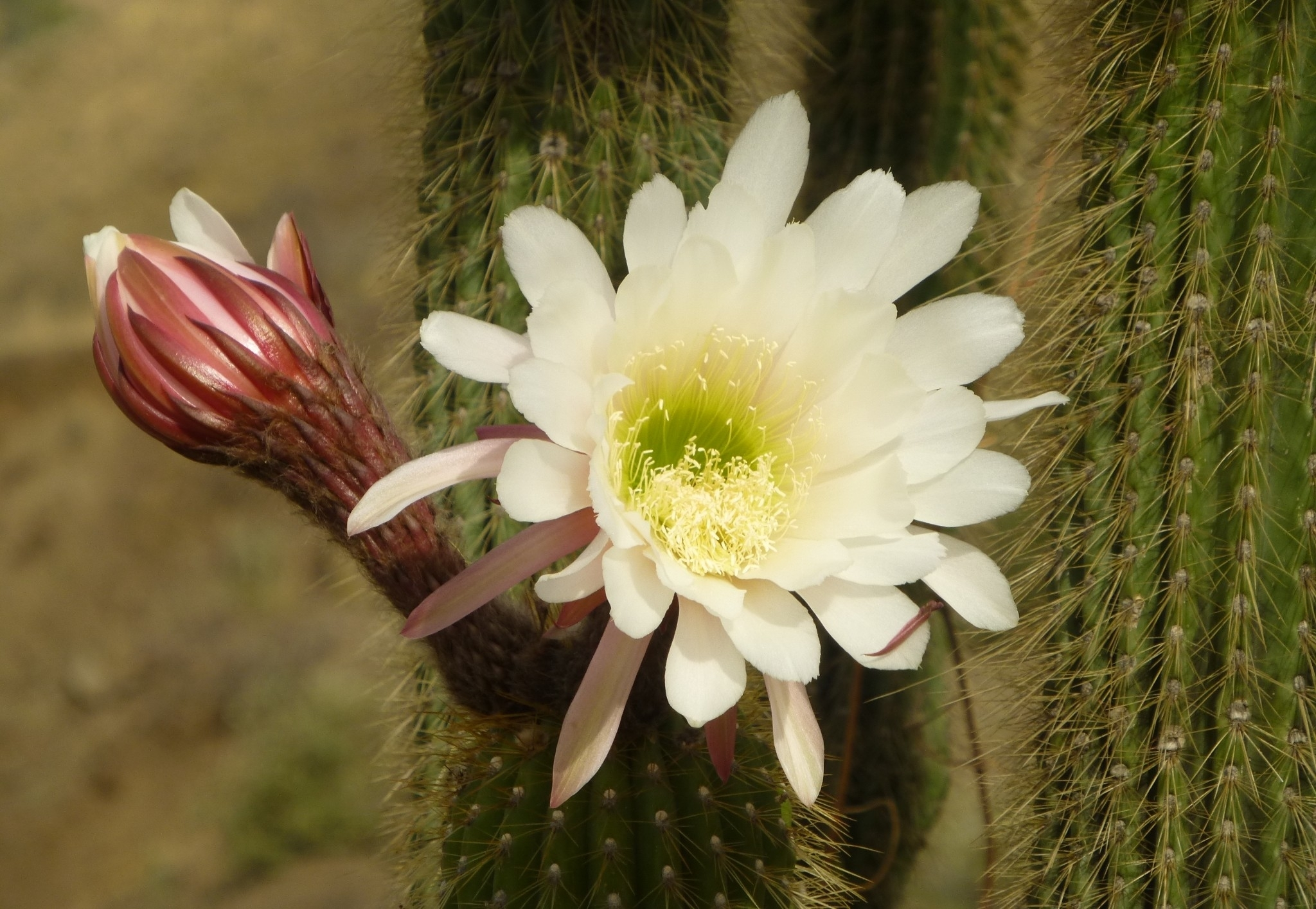
Front of flower

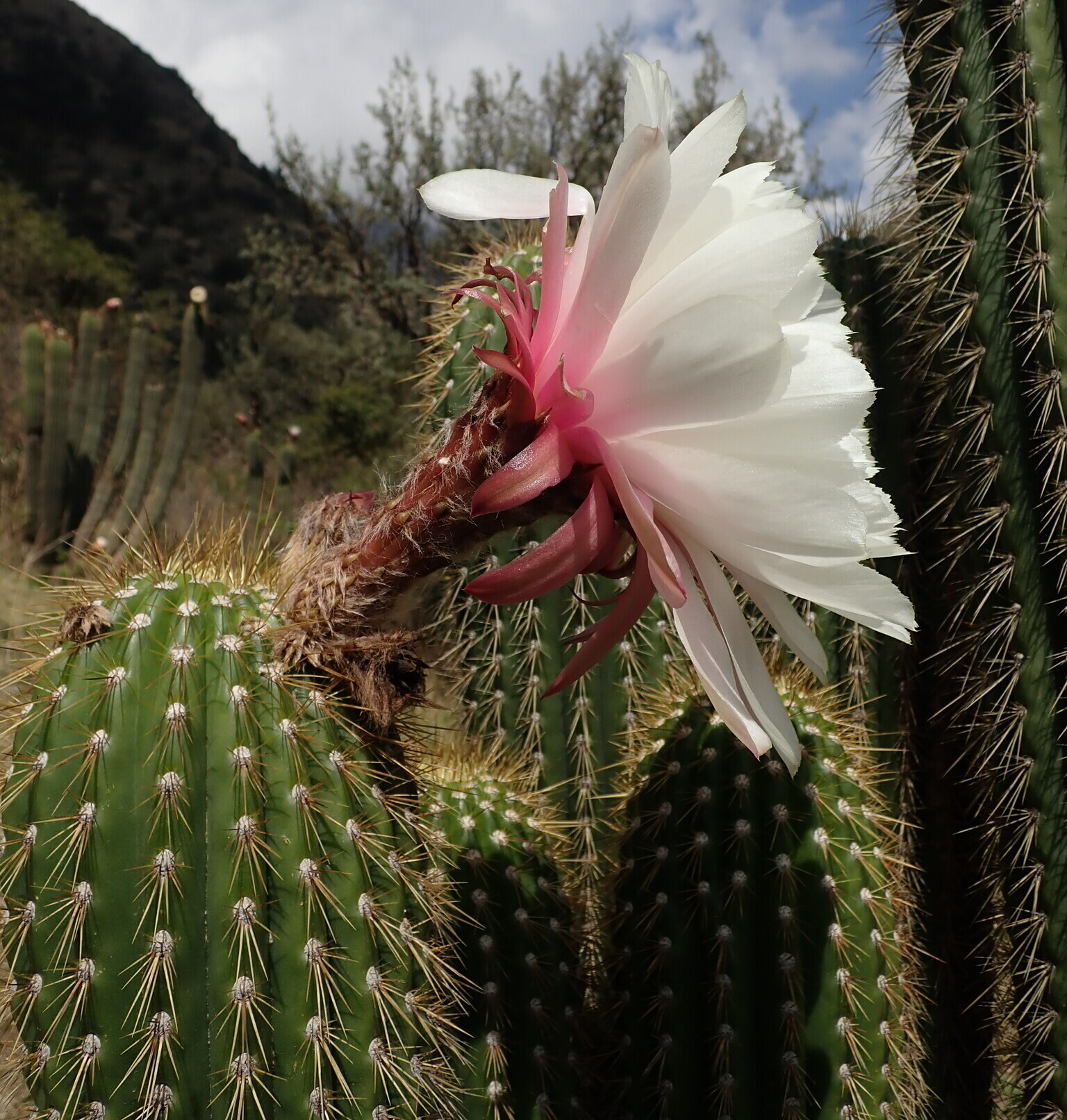
Side of flower

== Distribution ==
Leucostele tunariensis is native to the Cochabamba department in Bolivia, specifically in the Cercado province on Cerro Tunari at elevations between 3000 and 3800 meters.

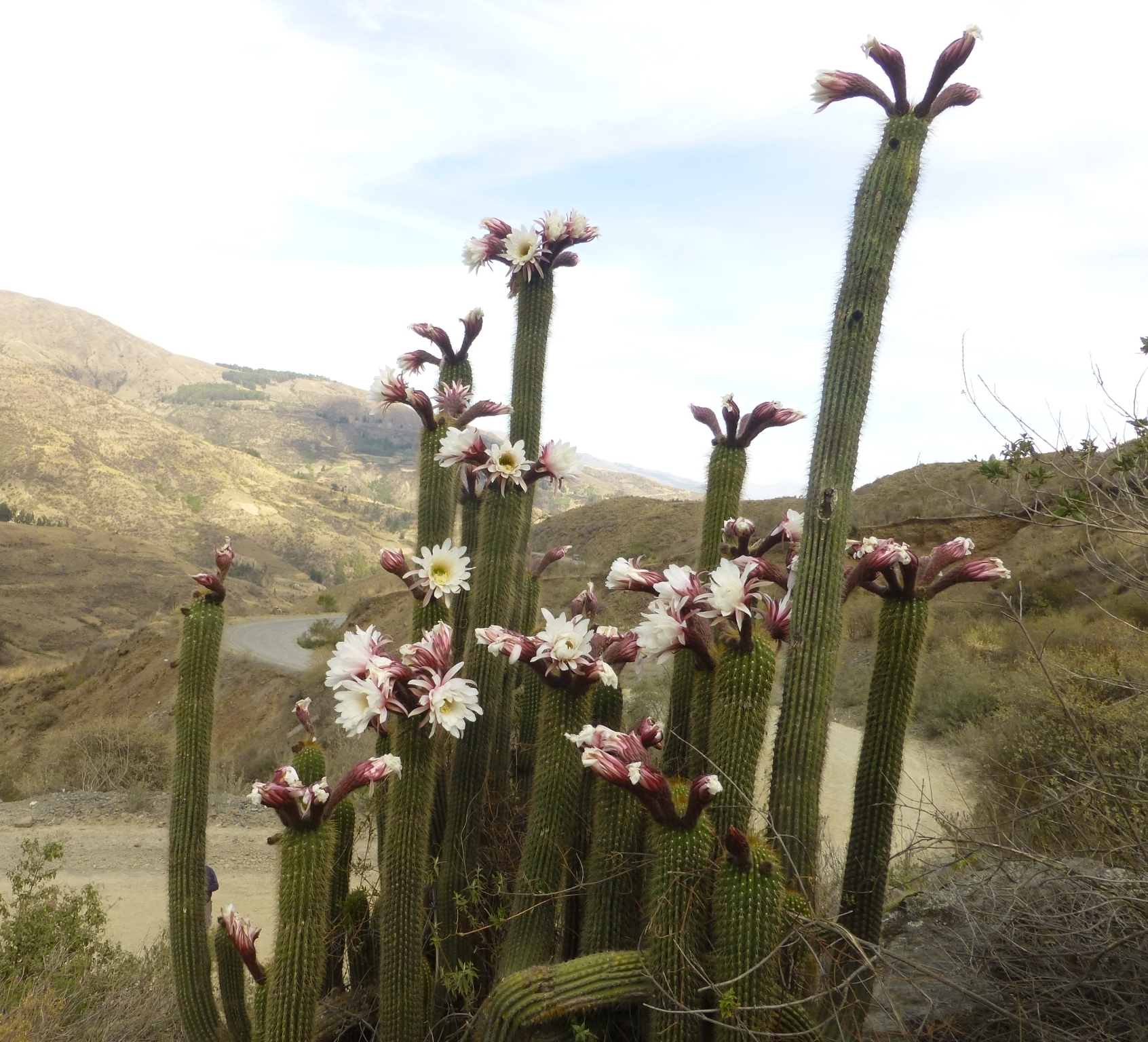
Blooming plants near K'aspi Cancha, Bolivia

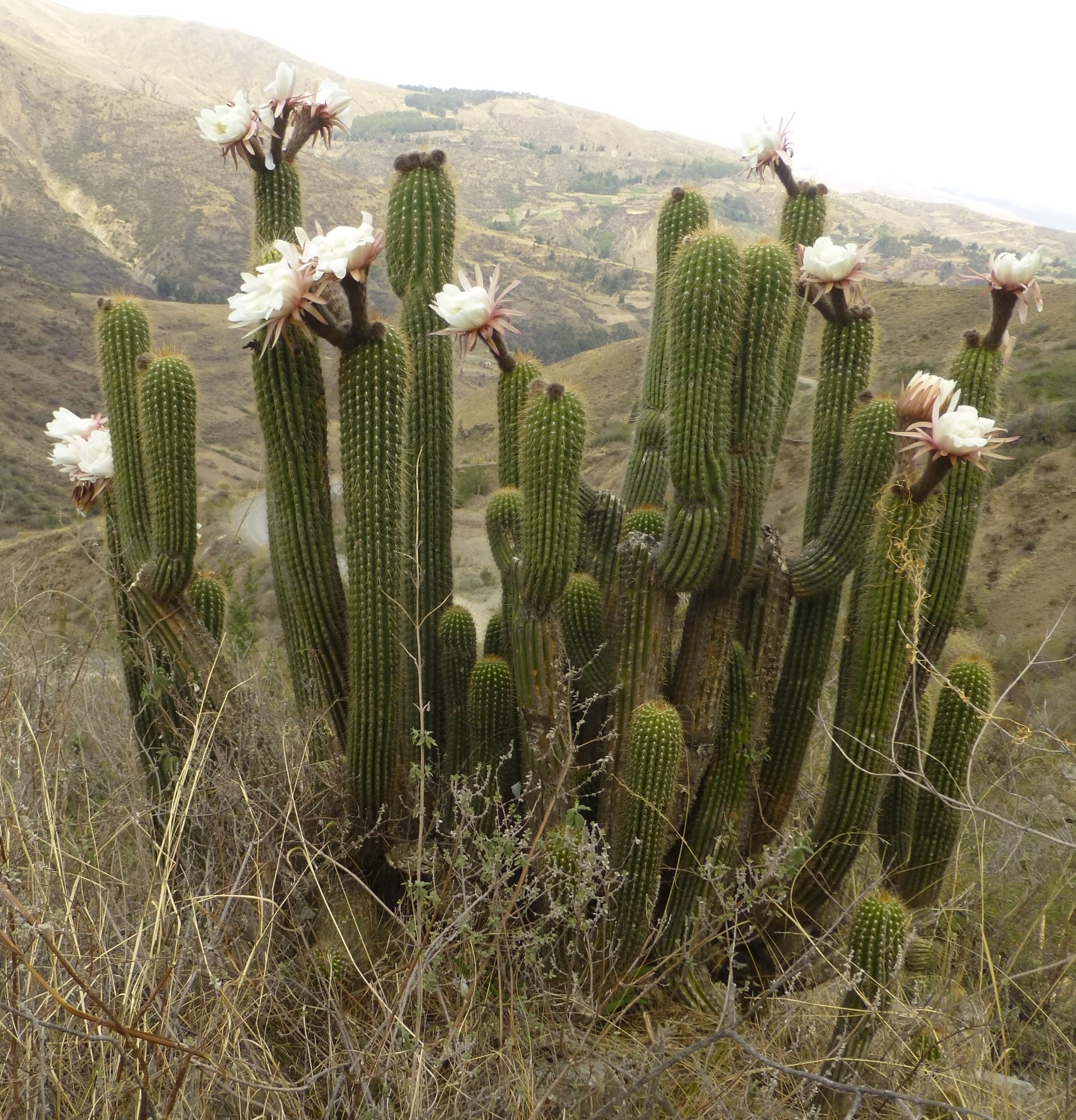
Blooming plants near K'aspi Cancha, Bolivia

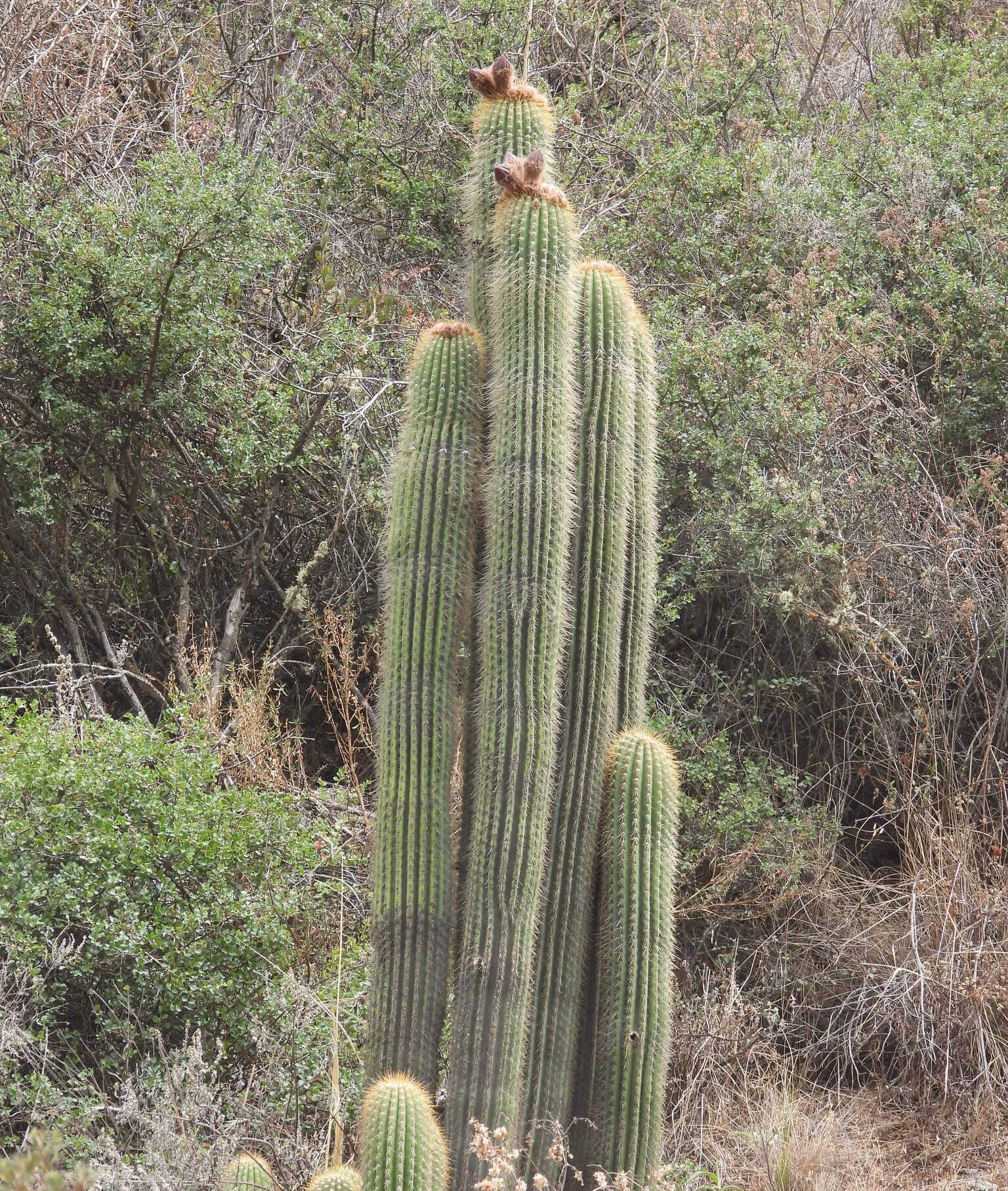
Plants growing near K'aspi Cancha, Bolivia

== Taxonomy ==
Martín Cárdenas initially described the species as Trichocereus tunariensis in 1959, with the species name "tunariensis" denoting its presence on Cerro Tunari in Bolivia. In 2012, Boris O. Schlumpberger reclassified the species into the genus Leucostele. Additional nomenclatural synonym include Echinopsis tunariensis (Cárdenas) H. Friedrich & G. D. Rowley (1974).
