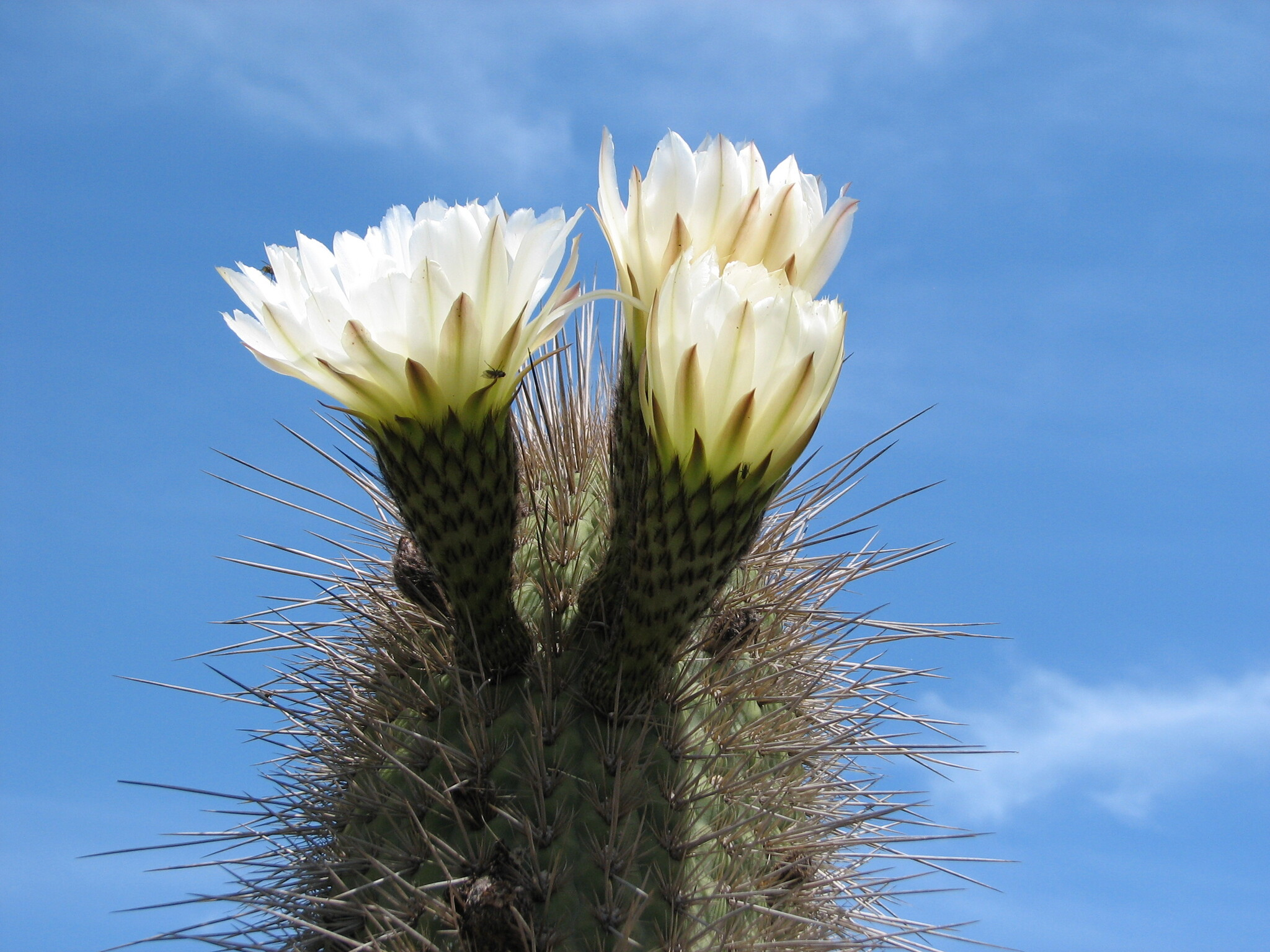

Scientific classification
- Kingdom: Plantae
- Clade: Embryophytes
- Clade: Tracheophytes
- Clade: Spermatophytes
- Clade: Angiosperms
- Clade: Eudicots
- Order: Caryophyllales
- Family: Cactaceae
- Subfamily: Cactoideae
- Genus: Leucostele
- Species: L. pectinifera

Binomial name
- Leucostele pectinifera (Albesiano) Schlumpb.

Synonyms
- Trichocereus pectinifer Albesiano 2012

= Leucostele pectinifera =

Species of cactus

Leucostele pectinifera is a species of Leucostele found in Chile.

== Description ==
Leucostele pectinifera can grow up to 80 cm tall, featuring approximately 15 branches, some of which are arched and have a 5 cm diameter. The stems display 10-11 ribs, measuring 2 cm wide, and exhibit obovate to round areoles, each 2-3 mm high and 0.7-1.2 cm wide, with yellow and gray tones. There are four central spines, varying in length from 1.5 to 6 cm. Some possess a dark brown tip, others have a green base and brown tip, while some are light gray with a brown tip, conforming to an arched configuration. Additionally, the areoles have 12-15 light brown radial spines, measuring 2 cm in length.

The flowers of this species are covered in black wool. The fruits, measure 3 cm in length and 4.5 cm in diameter, are enriched with subulate scales, each 3 mm in size and abundant in brown and gray color hairs emerging from the axils.

== Distribution ==
Leucostele pectinifera is native to Chile, specifically in Region IV of Coquimbo, and can be found at altitudes ranging from sea level to 500 meters.

== Taxonomy ==
The species is named after the pectinate distribution of radial spines in adult areoles.
