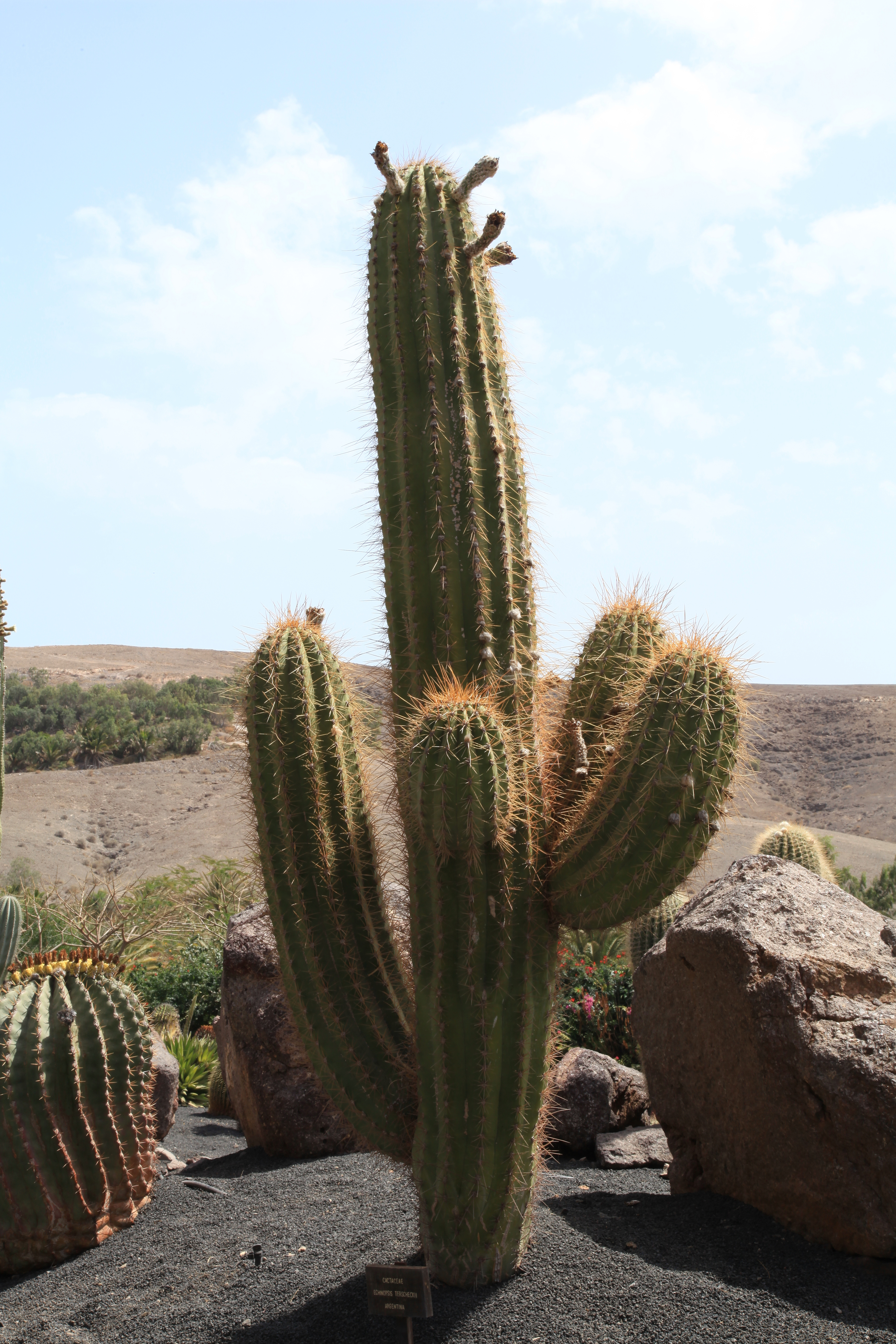
- Leucostele terscheckii

Scientific classification
- Kingdom: Plantae
- Clade: Embryophytes
- Clade: Tracheophytes
- Clade: Angiosperms
- Clade: Eudicots
- Order: Caryophyllales
- Family: Cactaceae
- Subfamily: Cactoideae
- Tribe: Cereeae
- Subtribe: Trichocereinae
- Genus: Leucostele; Backeb.

Type species
- Leucostele atacamensis

Species
- See text.

= Leucostele =

Genus of cacti

Leucostele is a genus of large cacti native to Argentina, Bolivia, and Chile.

== Description ==
Species in this genus have diverse growth forms, from shrubby, clump-forming plants under 1 meter tall to large, tree-like cacti over 10 meters high. Stems are cylindrical or slightly club-shaped, mostly erect, but some may be decumbent, arching, or prostrate. Many species branch at the base into dense clusters, while others develop a trunk with a branched, candelabra-like crown. The stem color varies from green to grayish-green, dark green, or yellowish-green. Stems have 8 to over 30 ribs, which are usually blunt but can be sharper. Ribs may be smooth or tuberculated. Areoles are round, oval, obovate, or oblong—are spaced along the ribs and often bear dense white, gray, yellow, brown, or black wool. Spines differ widely in number, size, and color; they can be needle-like, bristle-like, rigid, flexible, straight, or curved. Some species have distinct central and radial spines, while in others, these are hard to differentiate. Spine colors range from yellow and brown to gray and black, often with multiple colors in a single areole. In some taxa, apical spines form a silky, dense covering around the stem tips. Flowers occur near the stem apex—apically, subapically, or on upper sides—either alone or in clusters. They are funnel-shaped or less frequently bell-shaped, mostly white but sometimes pink, yellow, or green. The ovary and floral tube are covered with dense wool and hairs of various colors, along with scales. Stamens are arranged in multiple series within the floral tube, and the style protrudes from the flower’s throat. Flowering times vary, with species blooming during the day, night, or both. Fruits are fleshy pseudo-berries, generally globose or slightly ovoid, green to dark green, with scales and abundant axillary hairs. Many species produce edible fruits. Seeds are small, dark brown or black, with surfaces that can be smooth, rough, or finely pitted.

== Taxonomy ==
The genus Leucostele was defined by the German botanist Curt Backeberg and was first published in the scientific journal Kakteen und Andere Sukkulenten. The name "Leucostele" is derived from the Greek words "leukos," meaning "white," and "stēlē," meaning "column" or "post." This name refers to the tall, column-like shape of these cacti and their rigid, shiny, whitish spines, which resemble white columns.

== Species ==
Species of the genus Leucostele according to Plants of the World Online as of July 2023:

image	Scientific name	Distribution
	Leucostele atacamensis (Phil.) Schlumpb.	Chile, Argentina and Bolivia.
	Leucostele bolligeriana (Mächler & Helmut Walter) Schlumpb.	Chile (Cardenal Caro)
	Leucostele chiloensis (Colla) Schlumpb.	Chile
	Leucostele deserticola (Werderm.) Schlumpb.	Chile (Antofagasta to Coquimbo)
	Leucostele faundezii (Albesiano) Schlumpb.	Chile (Coquimbo)
	Leucostele litoralis (Johow) P.C.Guerrero & Helmut Walter	Chile (Coquimbo, Valparaíso).
	Leucostele nigripilis (Phil.) P.C.Guerrero & Helmut Walter	Chile (Atacama to Coquimbo)
	Leucostele pectinifera (Albesiano) Schlumpb.	Chile (Coquimbo)
	Leucostele skottsbergii (Backeb.) P.C.Guerrero & Helmut Walter	Chile (Coquimbo)
	Leucostele terscheckii (J.Parm. ex Pfeiff.) Schlumpb.	Argentina
	Leucostele tunariensis (Cárdenas) Schlumpb.	Bolivia
	Leucostele undulosa (Albesiano) Schlumpb.	Chile (Coquimbo)
	Leucostele werdermanniana (Backeb.) Schlumpb.	Bolivia
