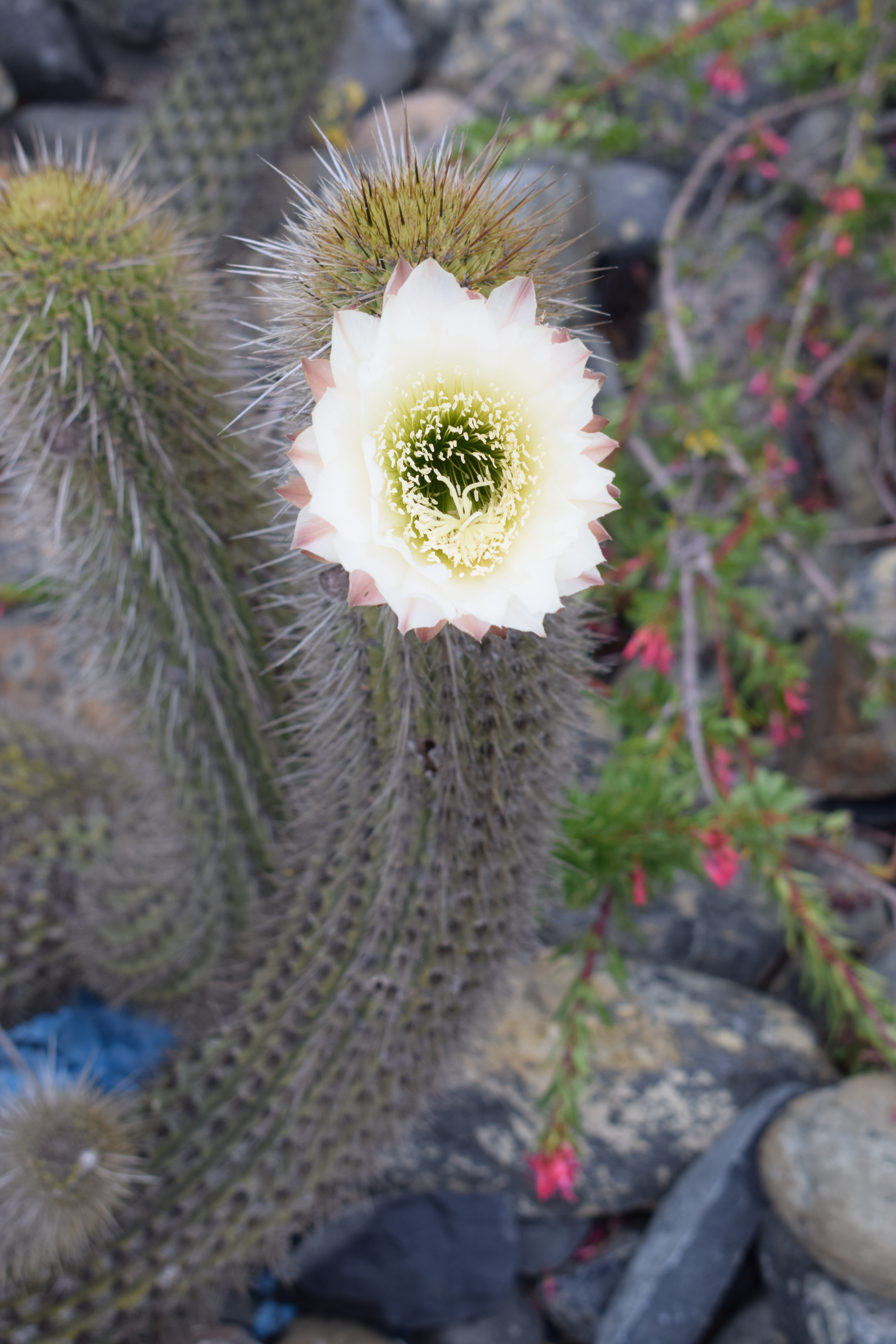

Conservation status
- Vulnerable (IUCN 3.1)

Scientific classification
- Kingdom: Plantae
- Clade: Embryophytes
- Clade: Tracheophytes
- Clade: Spermatophytes
- Clade: Angiosperms
- Clade: Eudicots
- Order: Caryophyllales
- Family: Cactaceae
- Subfamily: Cactoideae
- Genus: Leucostele
- Species: L. litoralis

Binomial name
- Leucostele litoralis (Johow) P.C.Guerrero & Helmut Walter 2019

Synonyms
- Cereus litoralis Johow 1923; Echinopsis chiloensis subsp. litoralis (Johow) M.Lowry 2003; Echinopsis litoralis (Johow) H.Friedrich & G.D.Rowley 1974; Trichocereus chiloensis subsp. litoralis (Johow) Faúndez 2007; Trichocereus litoralis (Johow) Looser 1929

= Leucostele litoralis =

Species of cactus

Leucostele litoralis is a species of Leucostele found in Chile.

== Description ==
Leucostele litoralis grows shrubby, branches from the base with several arched or upright branches and reaches heights of 1 to 3 meters. The cylindrical, gray-green to dark green shoots reach a diameter of 10 to 18 cm (3.9 to 7.1 in) and 50 cm long. There are about 17-21 fairly distinct and not very wide ribs that are somewhat humpbacked. The oblique areoles on them are yellowish white and are up to 1 cm (0.39 in) apart. The spines emerging from them are initially yellowish and later turn gray. The two to seven somewhat unequal, fairly thick central spines are 1.6 to 2.4 cm (0.63 to 0.94 in) long. The 15 to 29 thin, apical marginal spines are radiating, 2 cm long, gray to light brown.

The 1-2 funnel-shaped, white flowers appear on the subapical sides near the tips of the shoots and are also open during the day. They are 12 to 16 cm (4.7 to 6.3 in) long and have a diameter of up to 11 cm (4.3 in). The brownish green fruits reach a diameter of 3 to 5 cm (1.2 to 2.0 in).

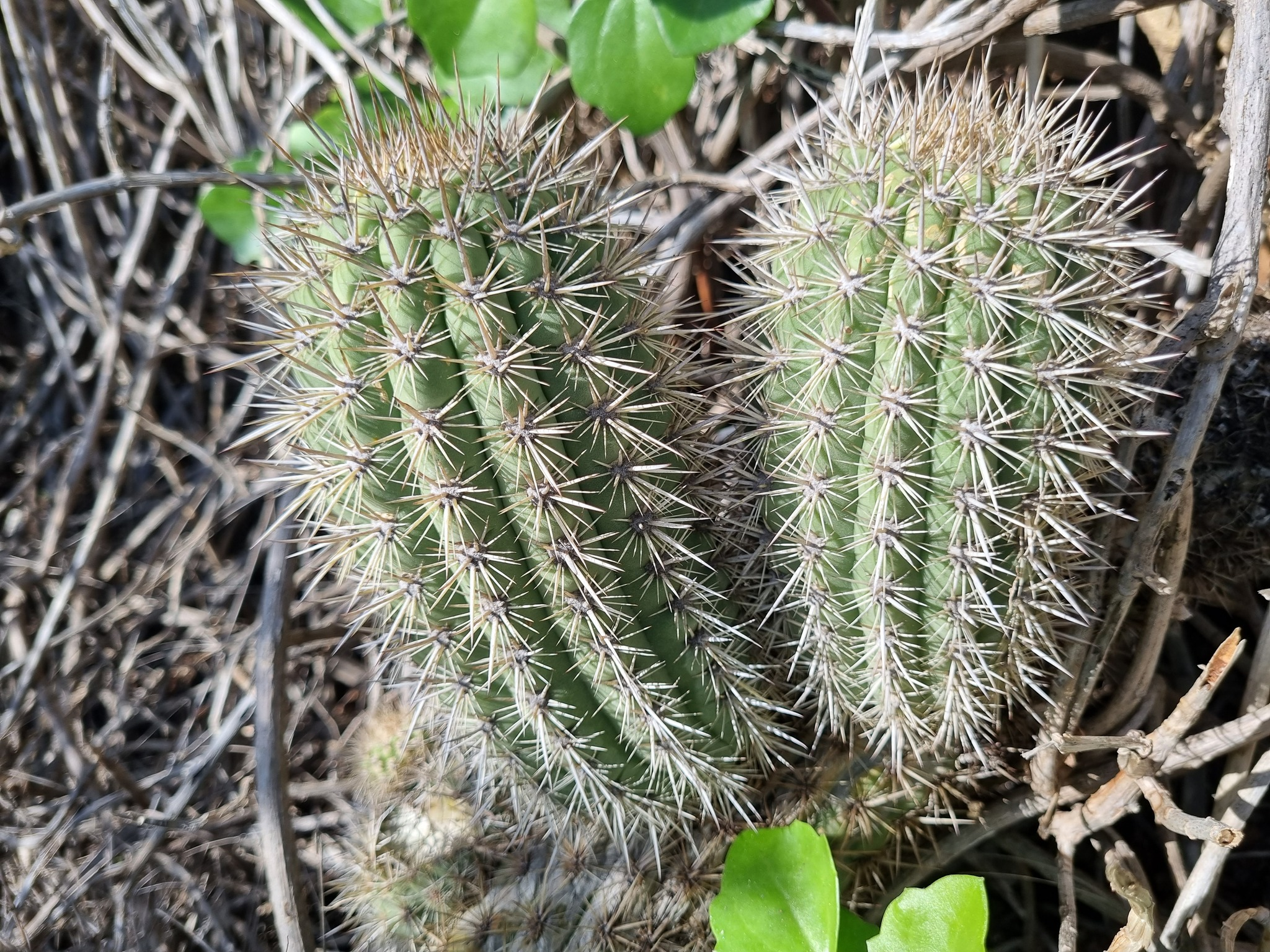
Plants closeup

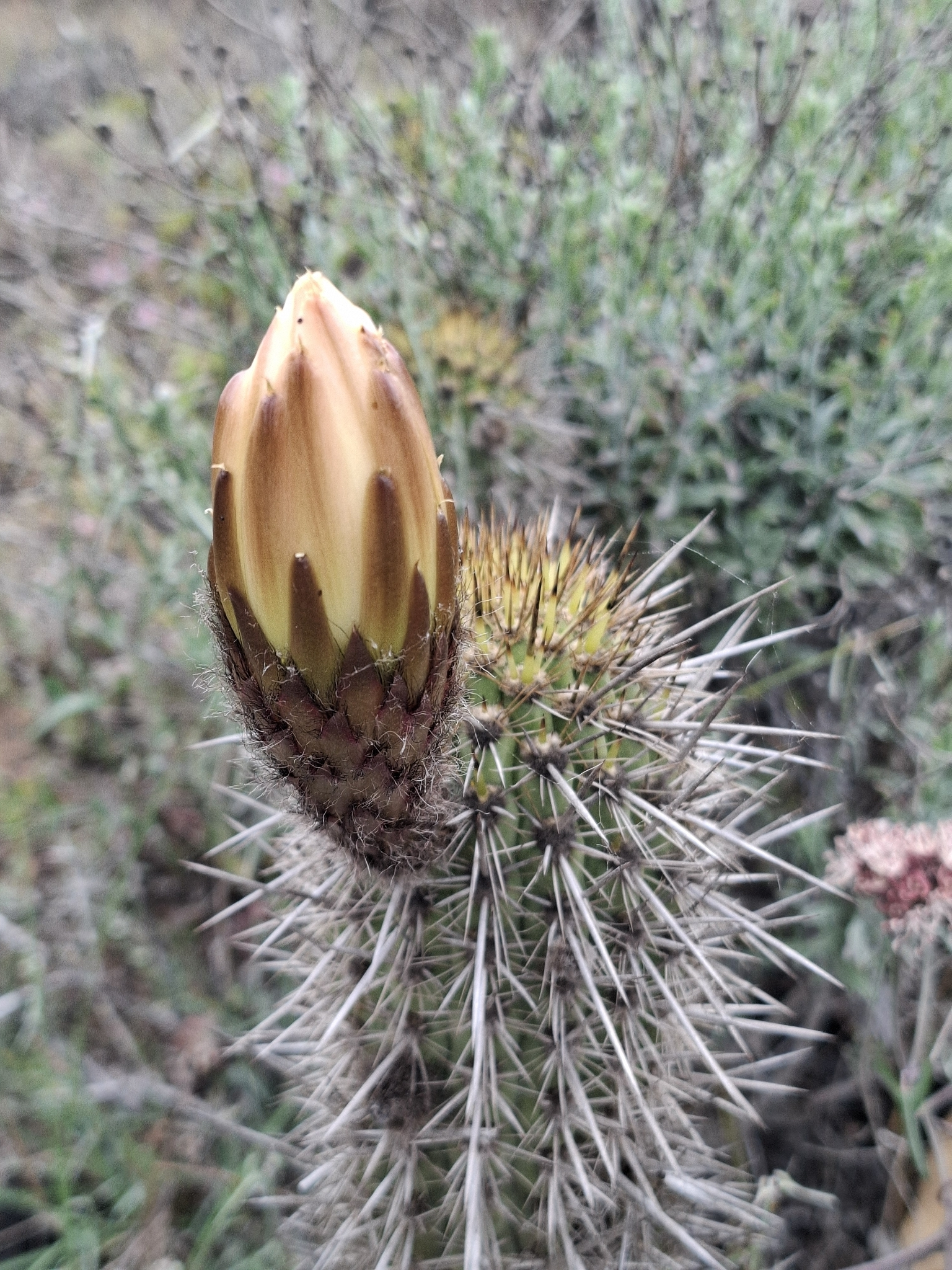
Flower buds and spines

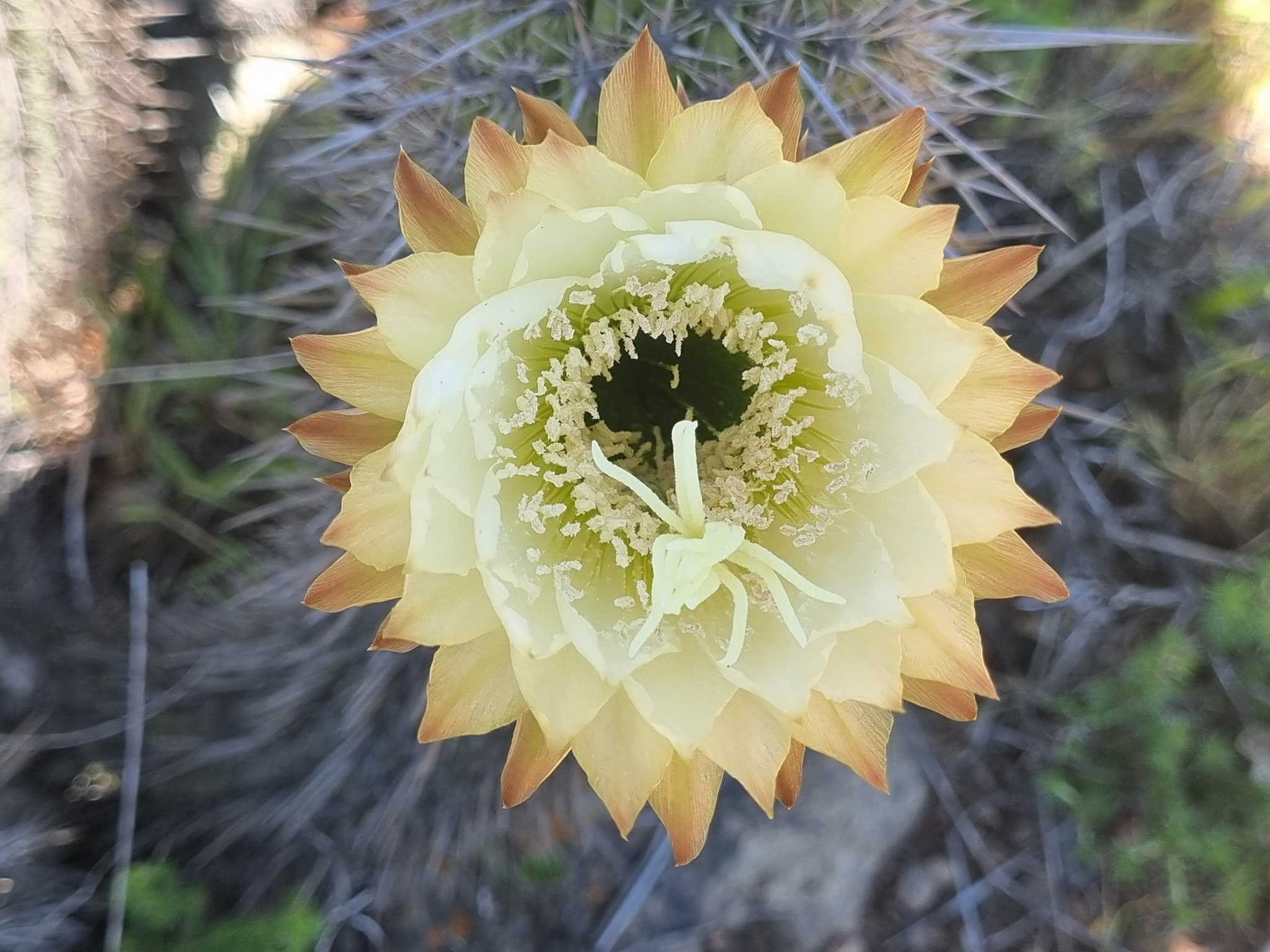
Flower

== Distribution ==
Leucostele litoralis is found in the Chilean regions of Coquimbo and Valparaíso, close to the coast at elevations of 33 to 100 meters. The plant is found growing in scrub and coastal plains along with Fuchsia lycioides.

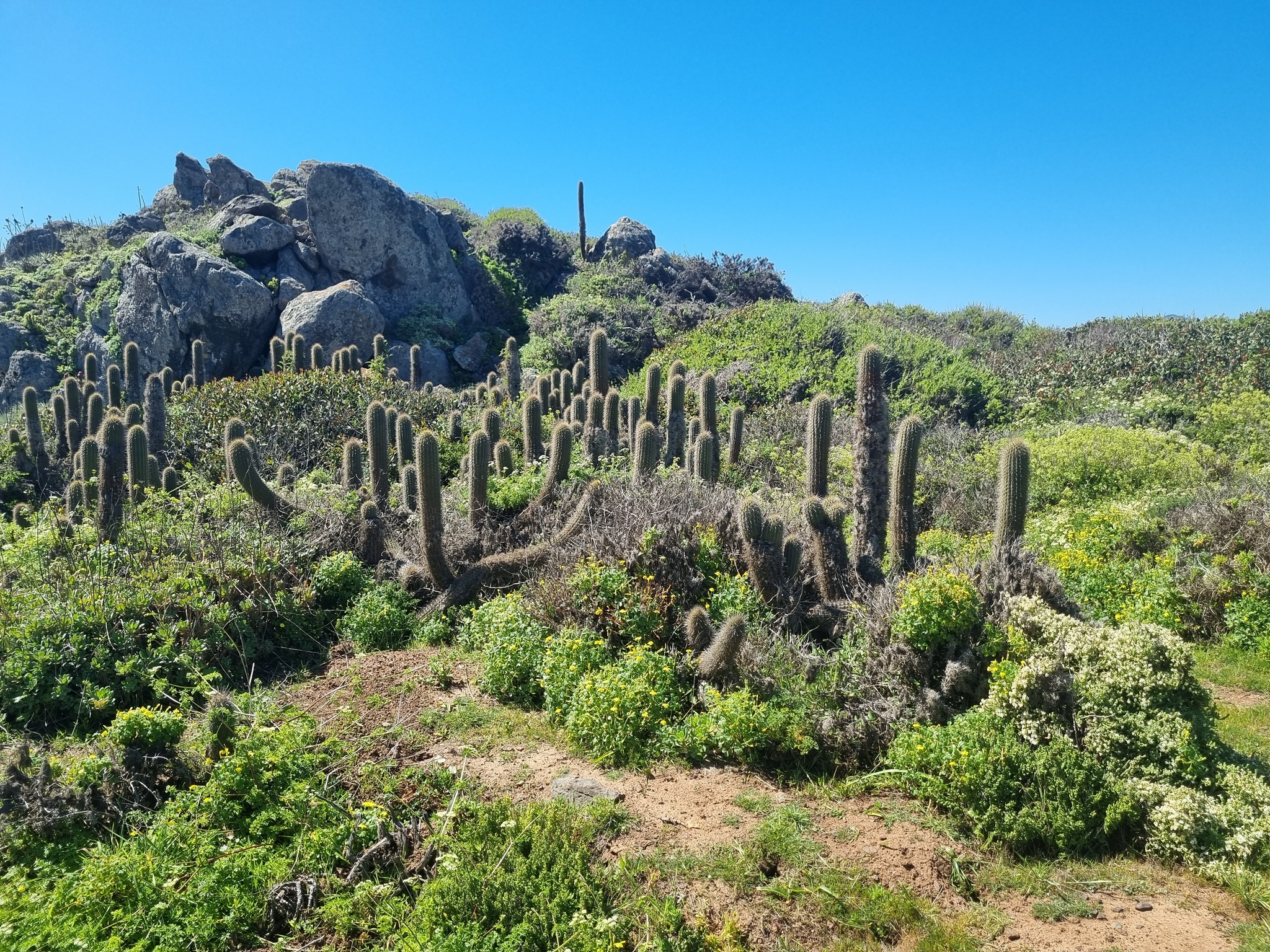
Habitat in La Ligua, Chile

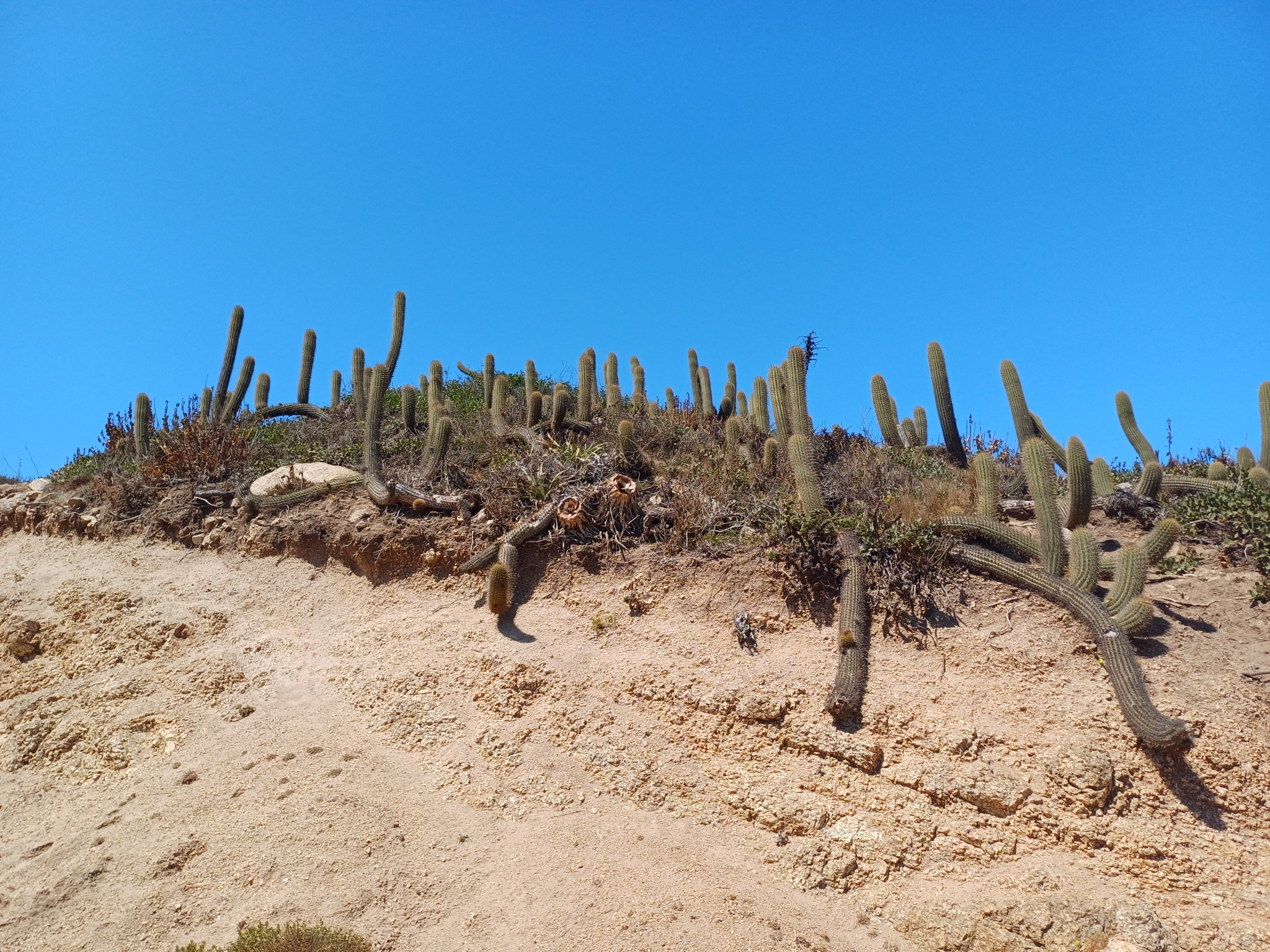
Habitat in Algarrobo, Chile

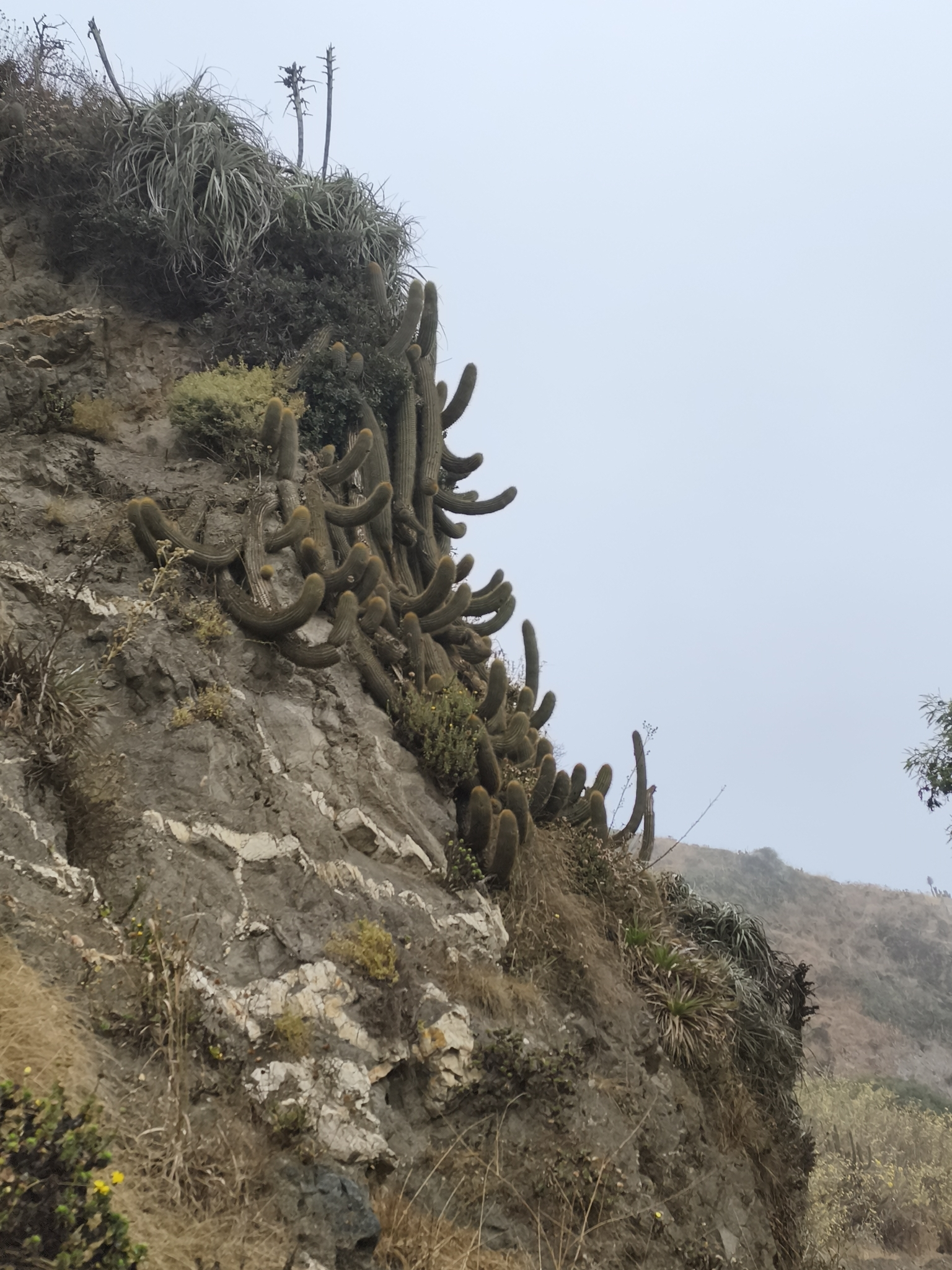
Plants growing on cliff side in Quintay, Casablanca, Chile

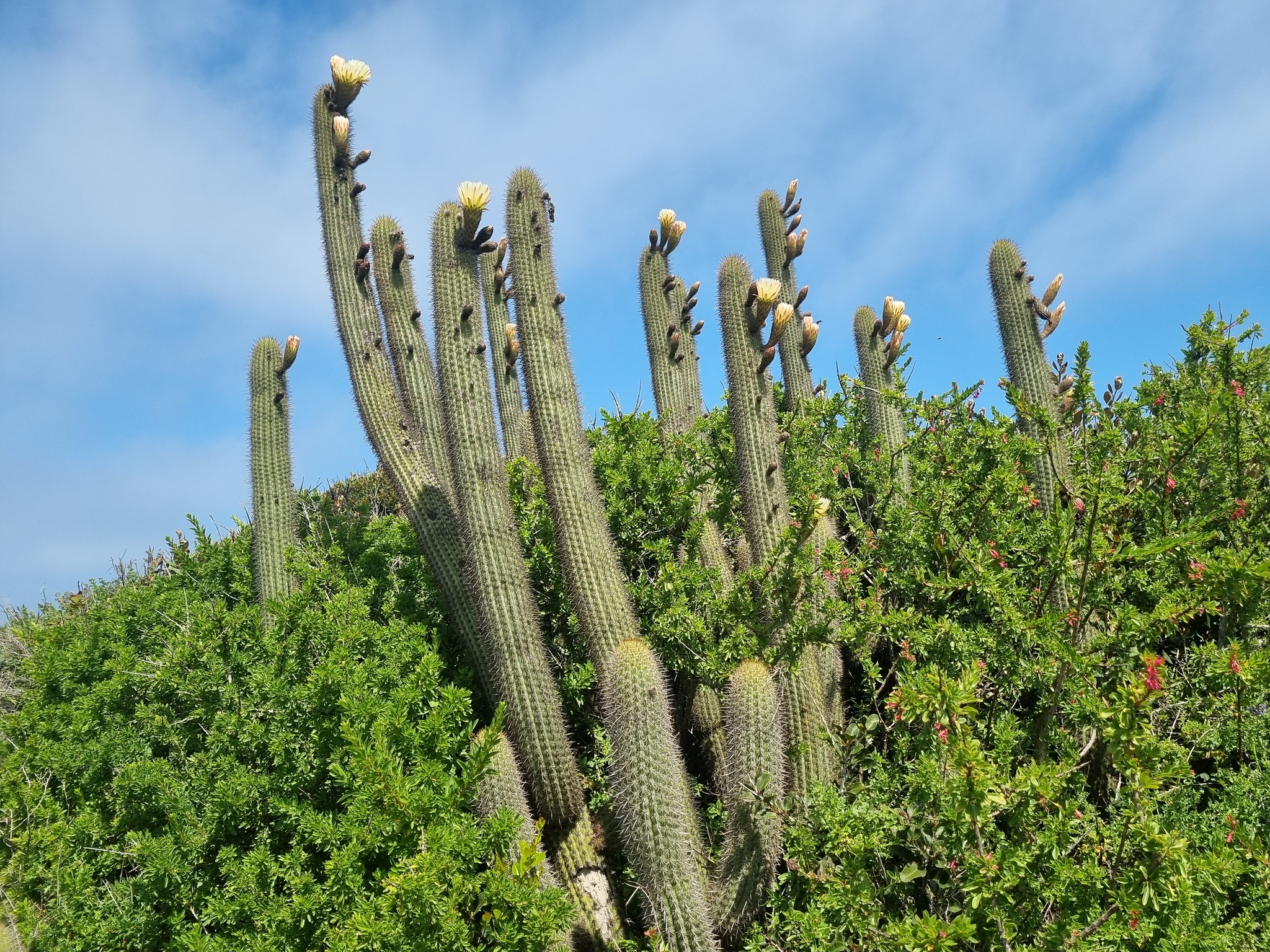
Plants blooming in La Ligua, Chile

== Taxonomy ==
The first description as Cereus litoralis by Friedrich Richard Adelbert Johow was published in 1923. The specific epithet litoralis comes from Latin, means 'on the coast' and refers to the species' near-shore occurrence. Pablo C. Guerrero and Helmut Walter placed the species in the genus Leucostele in 2019. Further nomenclature synonyms are Trichocereus litoralis (Johow) Looser (1929), Echinopsis litoralis (Johow) H.Friedrich & G.D.Rowley (1974), Echinopsis chiloensis subsp. litoralis (Johow) M.Lowry (2003) and Trichocereus chiloensis subsp. litoralis (Johow) Faúndez (2007).
