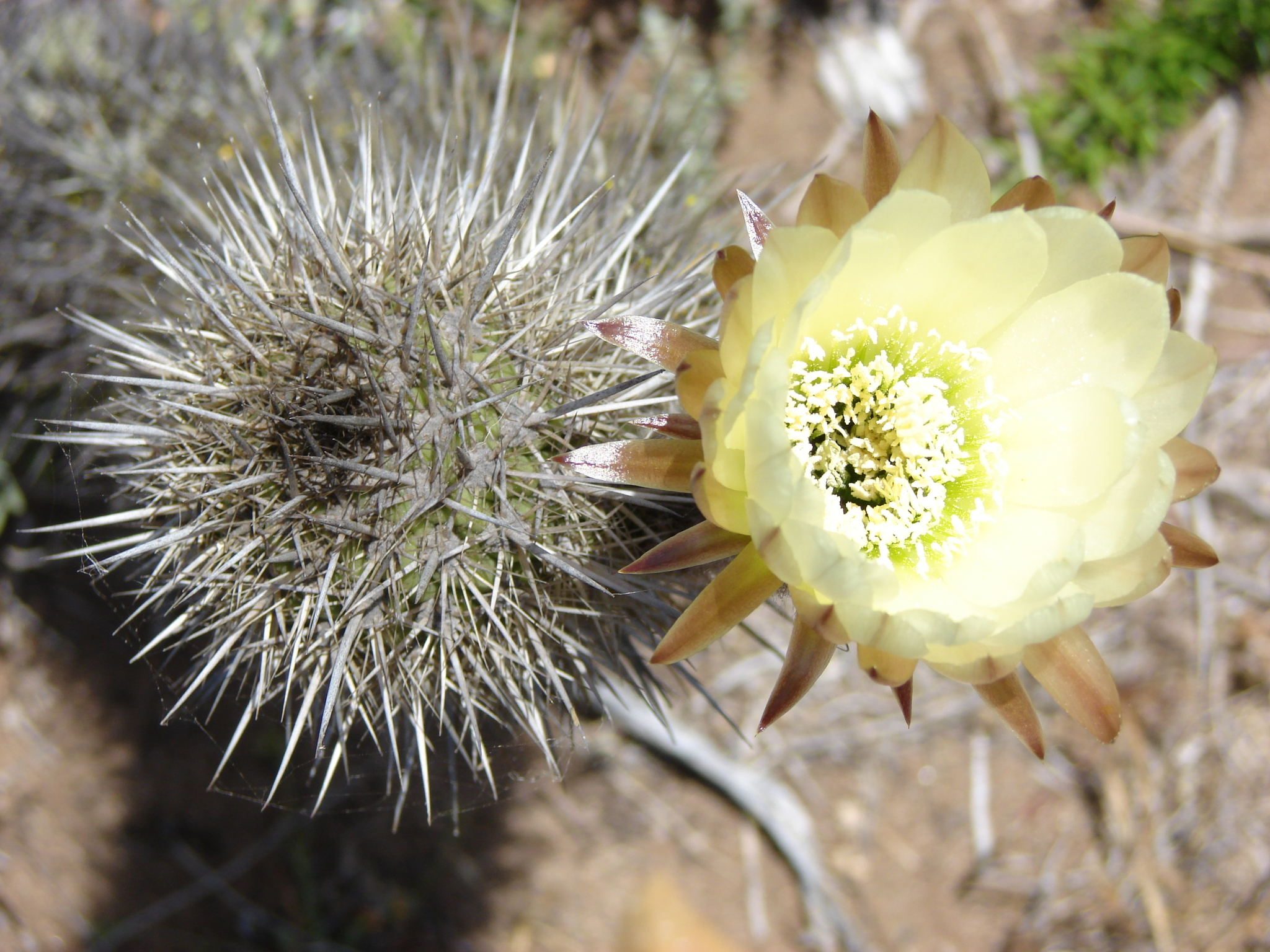

Scientific classification
- Kingdom: Plantae
- Clade: Embryophytes
- Clade: Tracheophytes
- Clade: Spermatophytes
- Clade: Angiosperms
- Clade: Eudicots
- Order: Caryophyllales
- Family: Cactaceae
- Subfamily: Cactoideae
- Genus: Leucostele
- Species: L. faundezii

Binomial name
- Leucostele faundezii (Albesiano) Schlumpb.

Synonyms
- Trichocereus faundezii Albesiano 2012

= Leucostele faundezii =

Species of cactus

Leucostele faundezii is a species of columnar cactus found in Chile.

== Description ==
Leucostele faundezii exhibits a columnar growth pattern, attaining a height of 80 cm. The branches are decumbent, spanning 14 cm in diameter, and display a grayish-green coloration. At the apex, there are 18 tuberculate and obtuse ribs, each measuring 2 cm in width and 3 mm in height. The obovate areoles, measuring 1 mm in height and 8 mm in width, have a gray color. The acicular gray spines consist of 1–3 central spines measuring 2.5 cm in length and 9 radial spines measuring 2 cm in length and 0.5 mm in diameter. The flowers, numbering between 2 and 6, appear subapical, measuring 11 cm in length and 9 cm in diameter, with an ovary diameter of 2 cm. Initially displaying a deep pink hue in flower buds, transitioning to white with a brownish-pink apex as they mature.

== Distribution ==
This species is native to Coquimbo, Chile and is found growing in sand dunes sometimes with the algae Trentepohlia aurea growing on the spine.

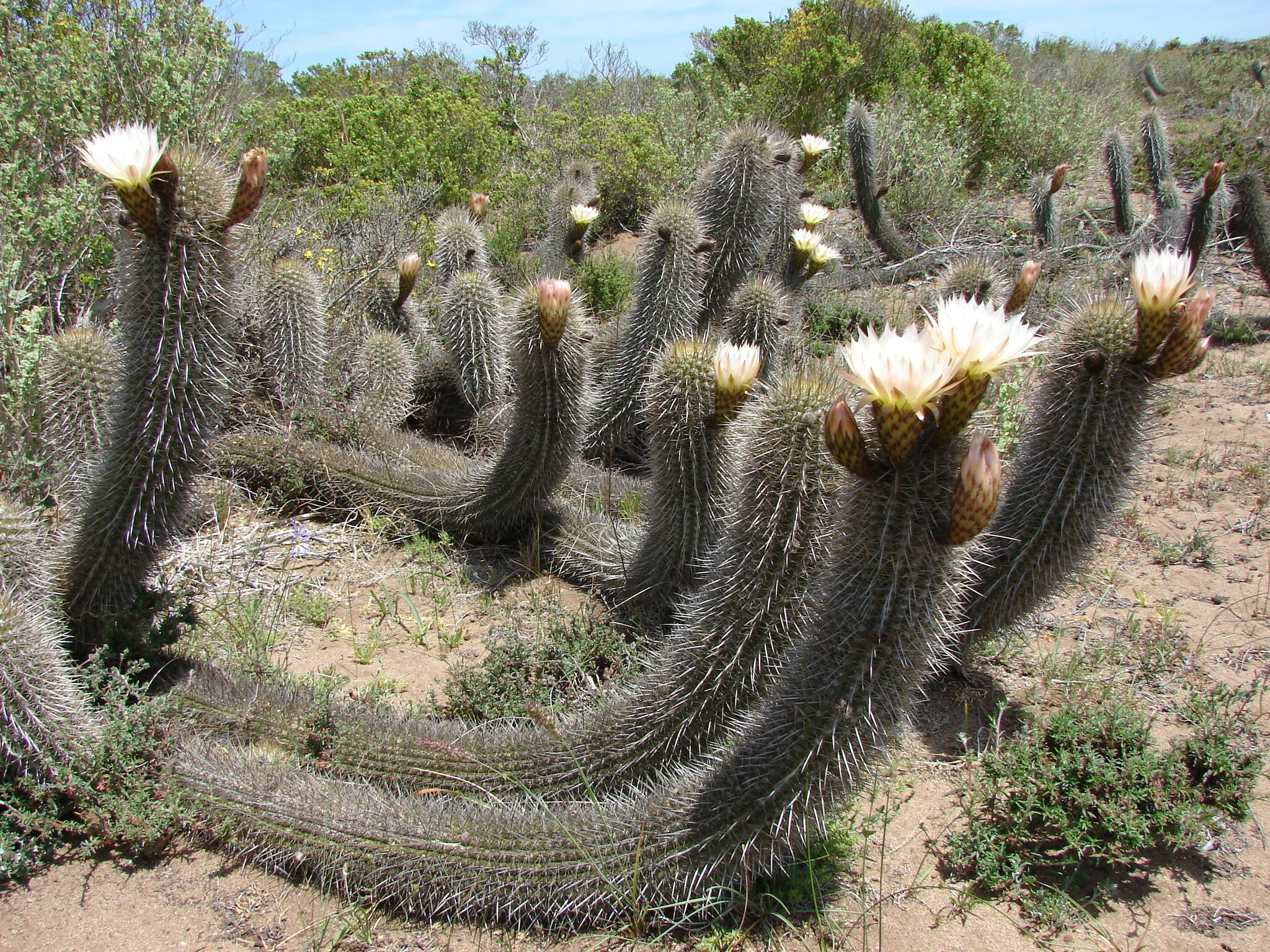
Plant growing in Los Vilos, Chile

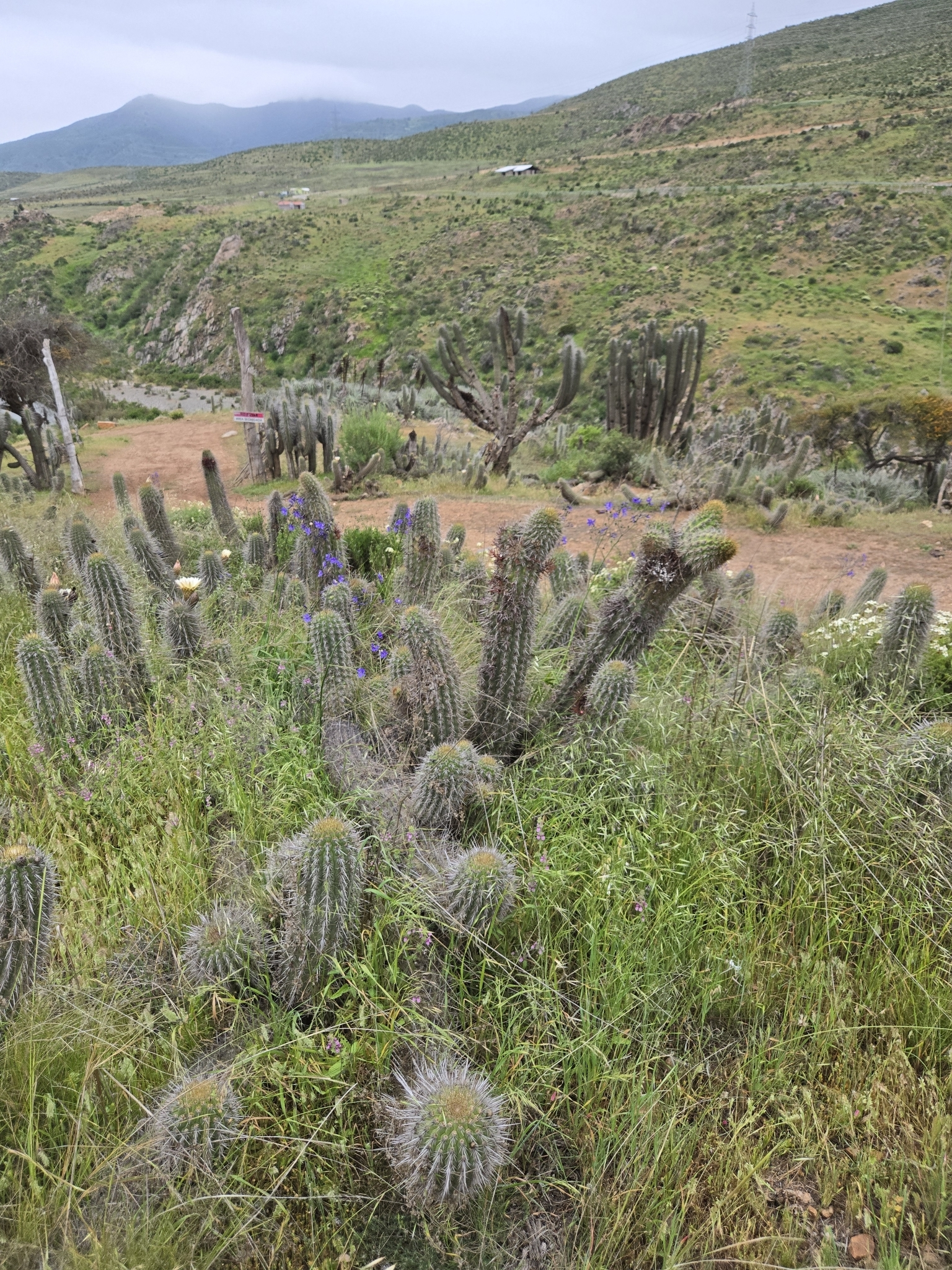
Habitat in Coyuntagua, Illapel, Chile

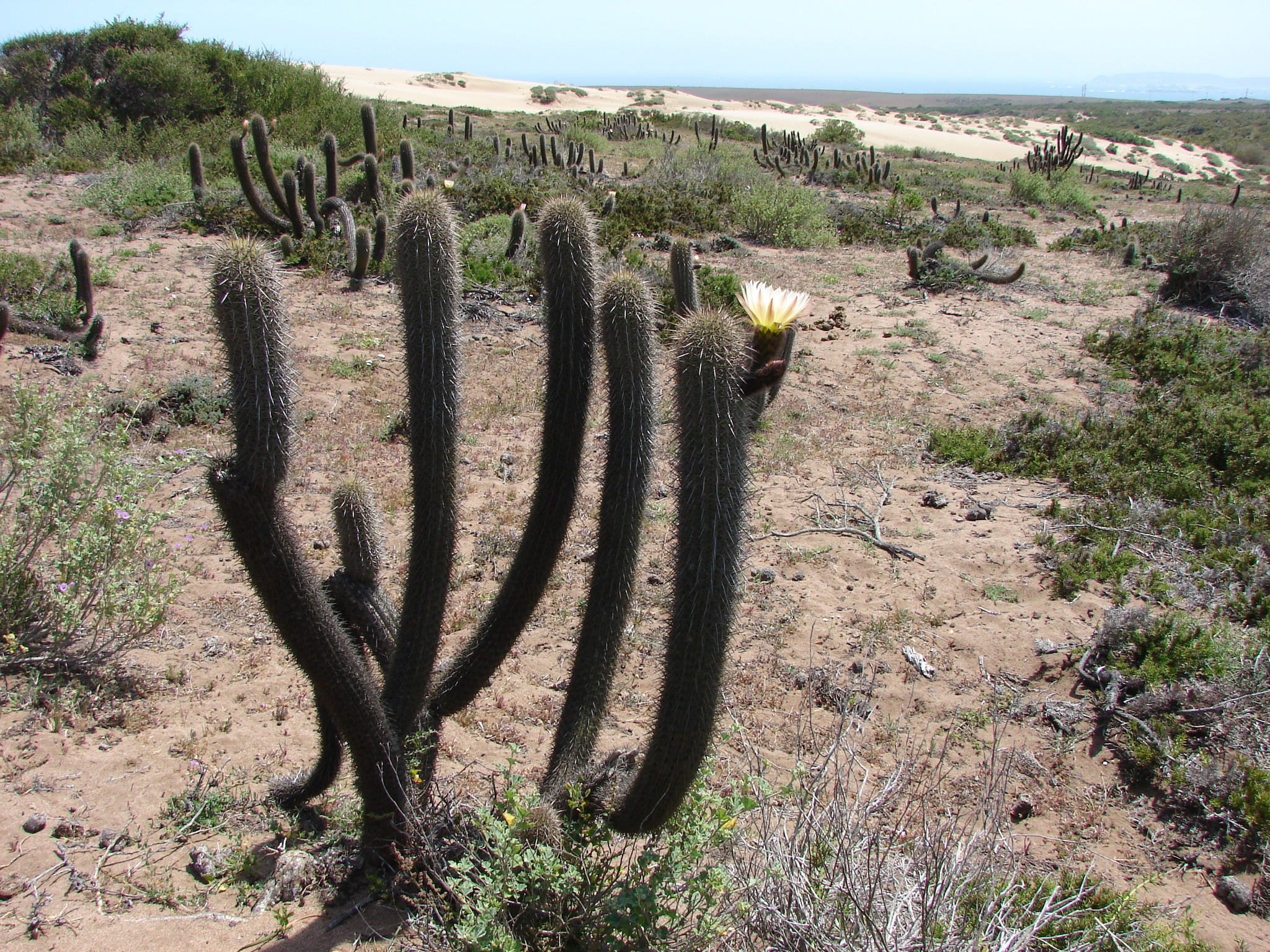
Habitat in Los Vilos, Chile

== Taxonomy ==
Originally described as Trichocereus faundezii in 2012 and named in honor of the Chilean botanist Luis Faúndez, the species was reclassified by Boris O. Schlumpberger in 2021, now belonging to the genus Leucostele.
