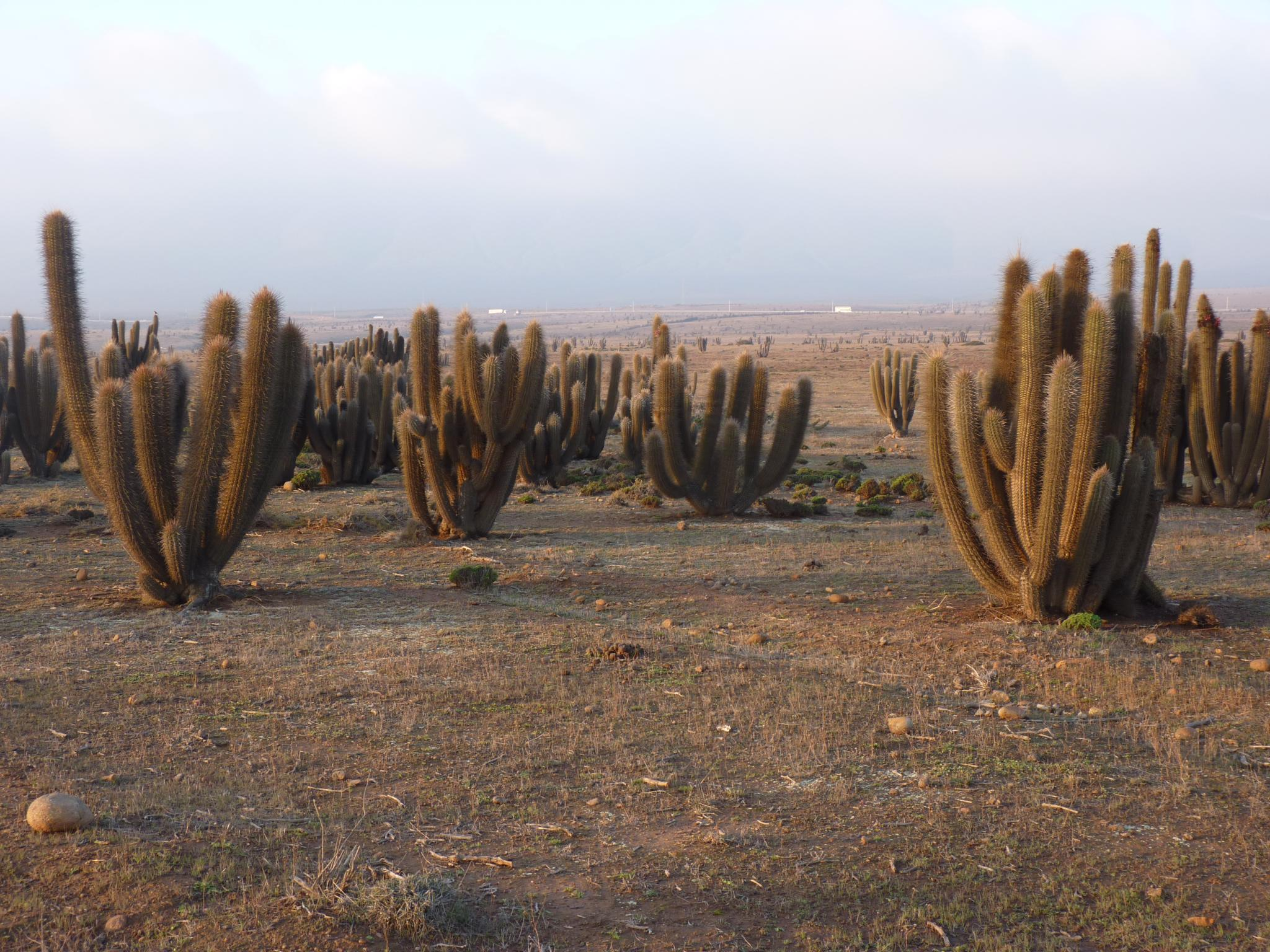

Scientific classification
- Kingdom: Plantae
- Clade: Tracheophytes
- Clade: Angiosperms
- Clade: Eudicots
- Order: Caryophyllales
- Family: Cactaceae
- Subfamily: Cactoideae
- Genus: Leucostele
- Species: L. skottsbergii

Binomial name
- Leucostele skottsbergii (Backeb. ex Skottsb.) P.C.Guerrero & Helmut Walter 2019

Synonyms
- Echinopsis chiloensis subsp. skottsbergii (Backeb.) G.J.Charles 2005; Echinopsis skottsbergii (Backeb.) H.Friedrich & G.D.Rowley 1974; Trichocereus skottsbergii Backeb. 1950; Echinopsis skottsbergii var. breviata (Backeb.) H.Friedrich & G.D.Rowley (1974; Trichocereus skottsbergii var. breviatus Backeb. (1956 publ. 1957

= Leucostele skottsbergii =

Species of cactus

Leucostele skottsbergii is a species of Leucostele found in Chile.

== Description ==
Leucostele skottsbergii grows as a shrub with a few columnar branches that branch out from the base and reaches heights of up to 2 meters. The cylindrical, gray-green shoots reach a diameter of up to 14 centimeters. There are 16 to 21 ribs. The areoles on them are grayish black. The thorns emerging from them are light brown to gray. The usually four to six central spines are up to 12 centimeters long. The 22 to 26 flexible, spreading, bristly marginal spines are not particularly piercing and are up to 6 centimeters long.

The funnel-shaped, white, pink flowers appear on the sides of the shoots and open during the day. They are 10 to 12 centimeters long. Their flower tube is covered with black or gray hairs. The spherical fruits are green.

== Distribution ==
Leucostele skottsbergii is widespread in the Coquimbo region of Chile at altitudes of 200 to 800 meters.

== Taxonomy ==
The first description as Trichocereus skottsbergii by Carl Johan Fredrik Skottsberg was published in 1950. The specific epithet skottsbergii honors the Swedish botanist and explorer Carl Johan Fredrik Skottsberg. Pablo C. Guerrero and Helmut Walter placed the species in the genus Leucostele in 2019. Further nomenclature synonyms are Echinopsis skottsbergii (Backeb. ex Skottsb.) H.Friedrich & G.D.Rowley (1974) and Echinopsis chiloensis subsp. skottsbergii (Backeb. ex Skottsb.)G.J.Charles (2005).
