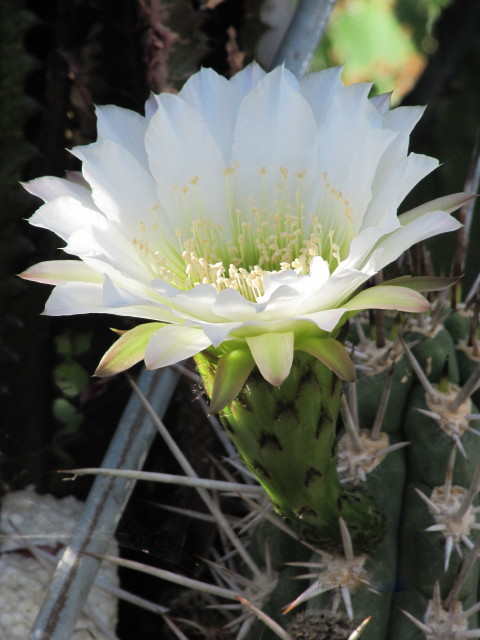

Conservation status
- Least Concern (IUCN 3.1)

Scientific classification
- Kingdom: Plantae
- Clade: Embryophytes
- Clade: Tracheophytes
- Clade: Spermatophytes
- Clade: Angiosperms
- Clade: Eudicots
- Order: Caryophyllales
- Family: Cactaceae
- Subfamily: Cactoideae
- Genus: Leucostele
- Species: L. deserticola

Binomial name
- Leucostele deserticola (Werderm.) Schlumpb. 2012

Synonyms
- Cereus deserticola Werderm. 1929; Echinopsis deserticola (Werderm.) H.Friedrich & G.D.Rowley 1974; Trichocereus deserticola (Werderm.) Looser 1929; Echinopsis deserticola var. fulvilana (F.Ritter) A.E.Hoffm. 1989; Echinopsis fulvilana (F.Ritter) H.Friedrich & G.D.Rowley 1974; Trichocereus fulvilanus F.Ritter 1962; Trichocereus serenanus F.Ritter 1965

= Leucostele deserticola =

Species of cactus

Leucostele deserticola is a species of cactus native to South America.

== Description ==
Leucostele deserticola grows shrubby, branches from the base with more or less upright branches and reaches heights of 1 to 1.5 meters. The shoots are cylindrical. There are eight to twelve deeply notched ribs, which are conspicuously grooved transversely above the areoles. The areoles on them are covered with dark wool - occasionally orange in the new shoots - and are up to 1.5 centimeters apart. The one to three central spines are sometimes curved and up to 12 centimeters long. The 15 to 25 unequal, thin-shaped radial spines are darker and turn gray with age. They are 1 to 1.5 centimeters long.

The funnel-shaped, white flowers are 7 to 8 centimeters long. Its pericarpel and flower tube are covered with dark wool. The spherical, green fruits 4 to 6 cm in length and are covered with subulate scales.

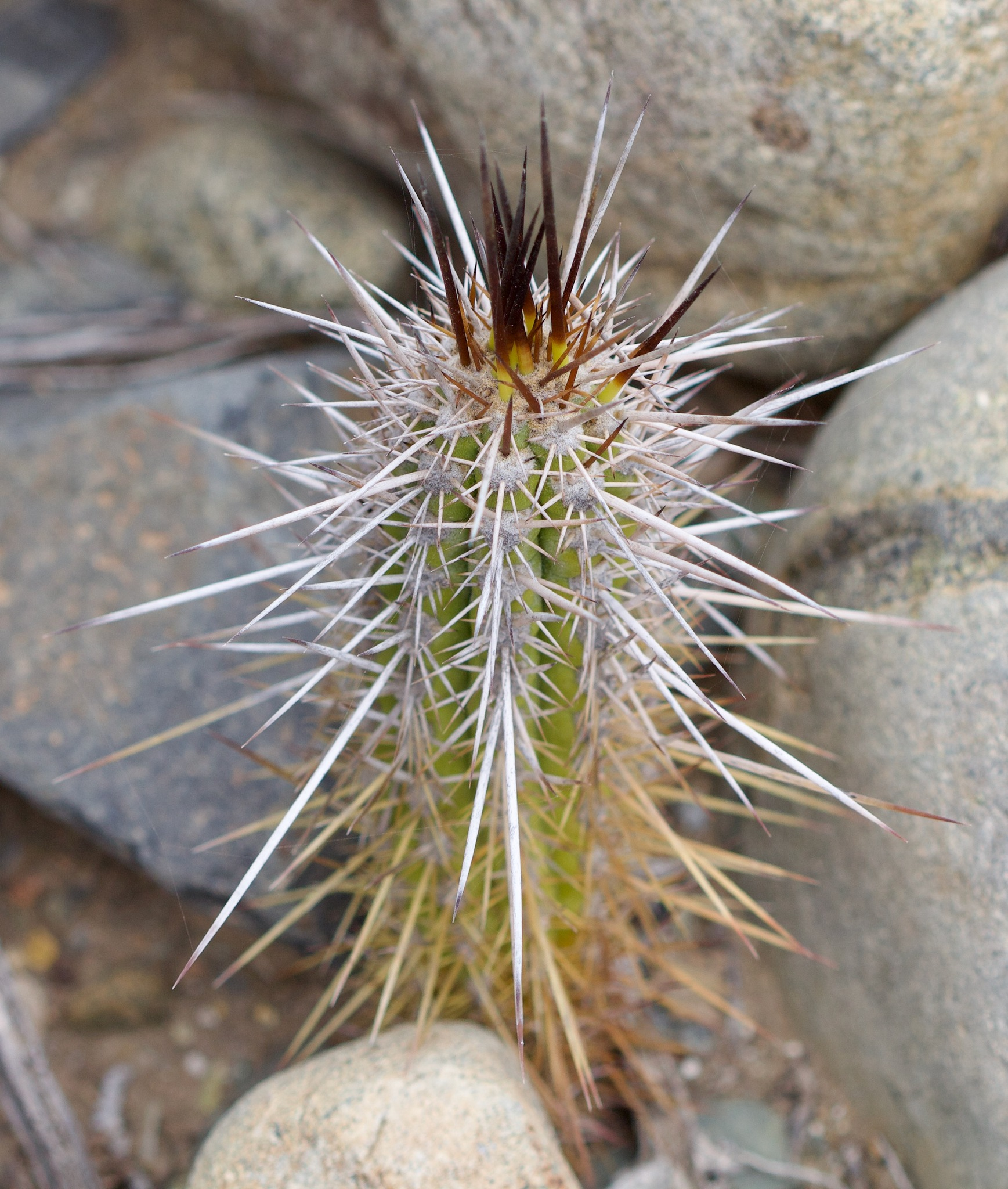
Spines close up

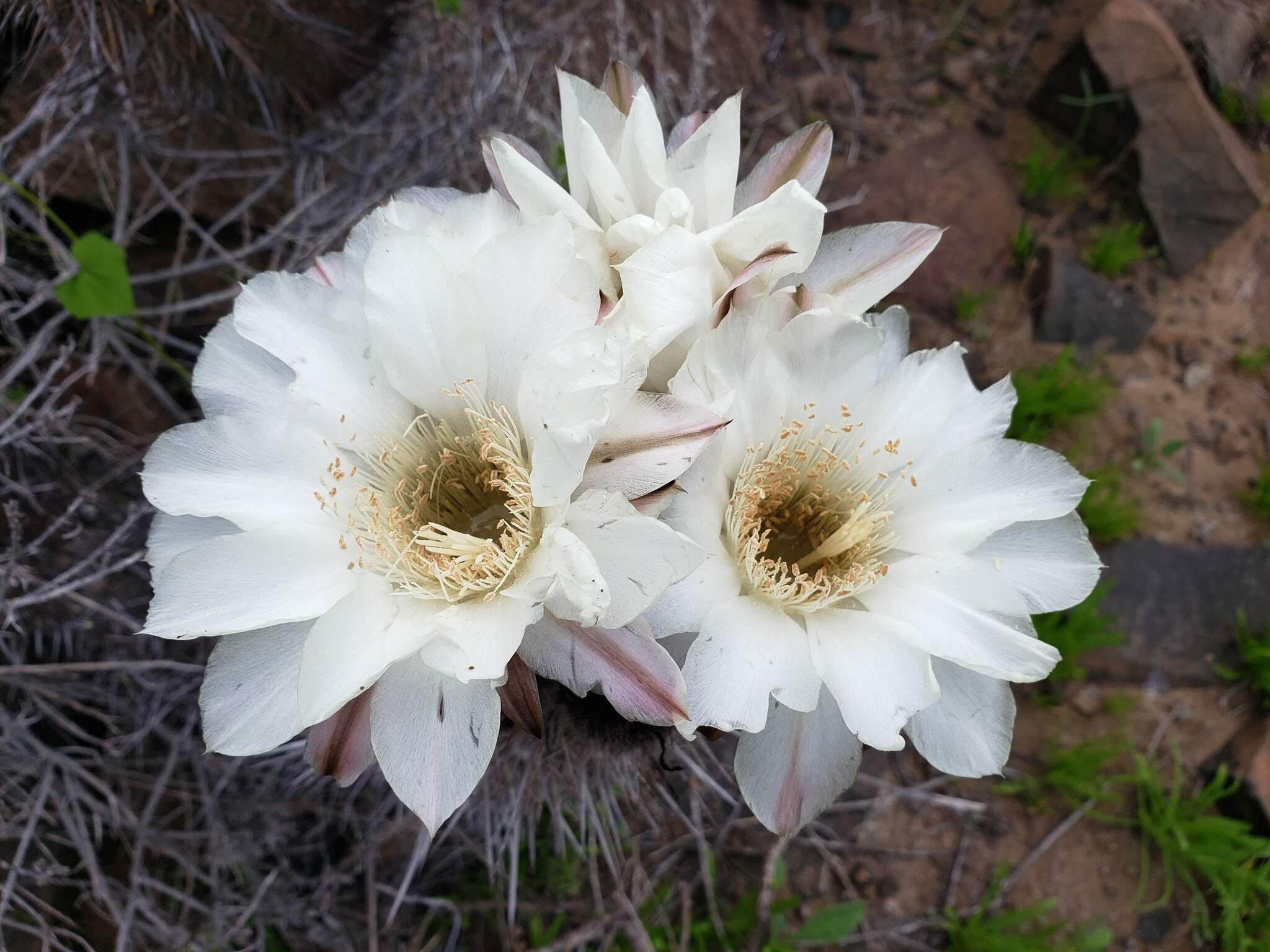
Flowers

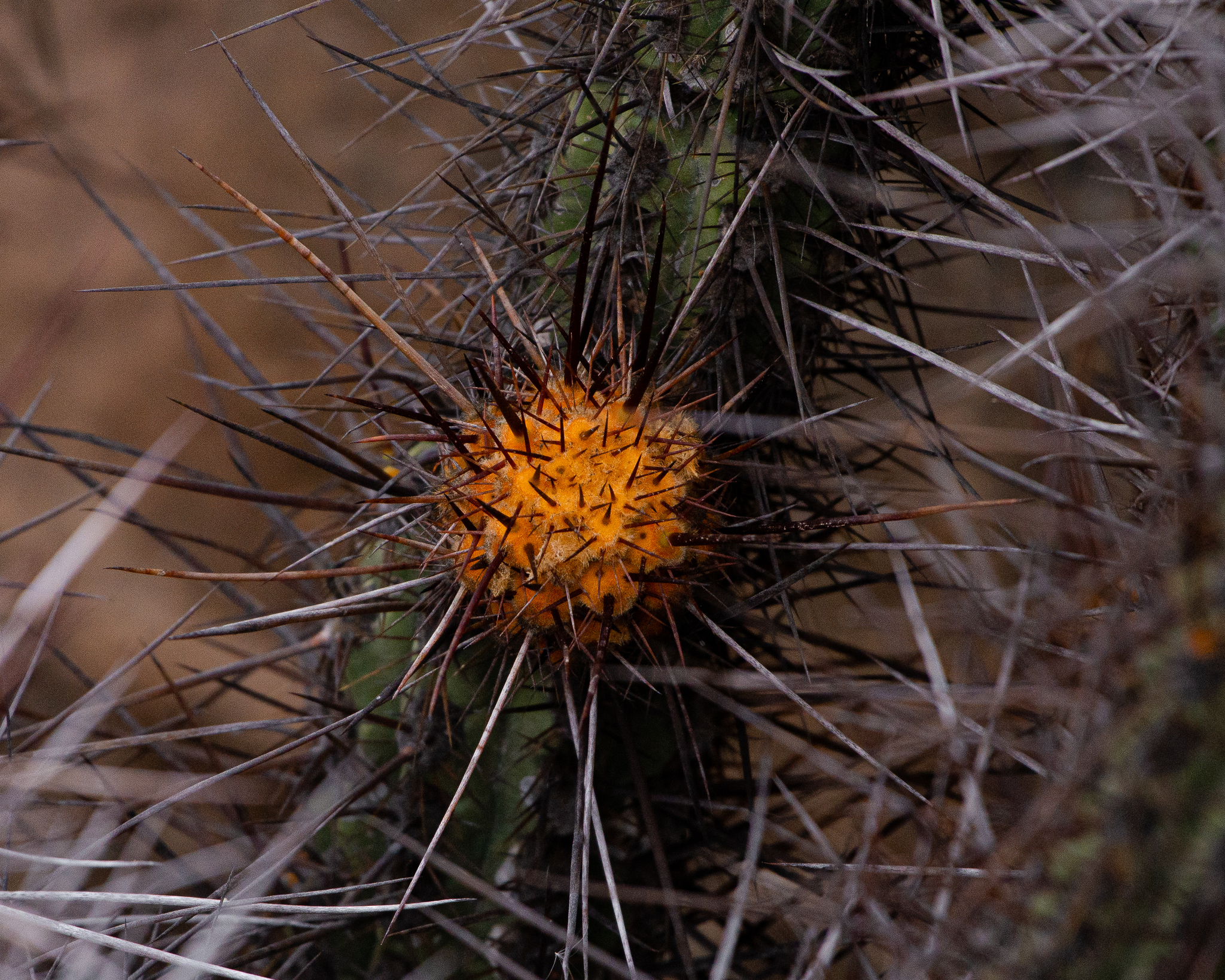
New shoots

== Distribution ==
Leucostele deserticola is widespread in the Chilean regions of Antofagasta, Coquimbo, and Atacama on the hills of the Cordillera de la Costa up to altitudes of 1000 meters. Plants are found growing in desert scrub and rocky outcrops growing in full sun along with Heliotropium stenophyllum, Encelia canescens, and Adesmia argentea.

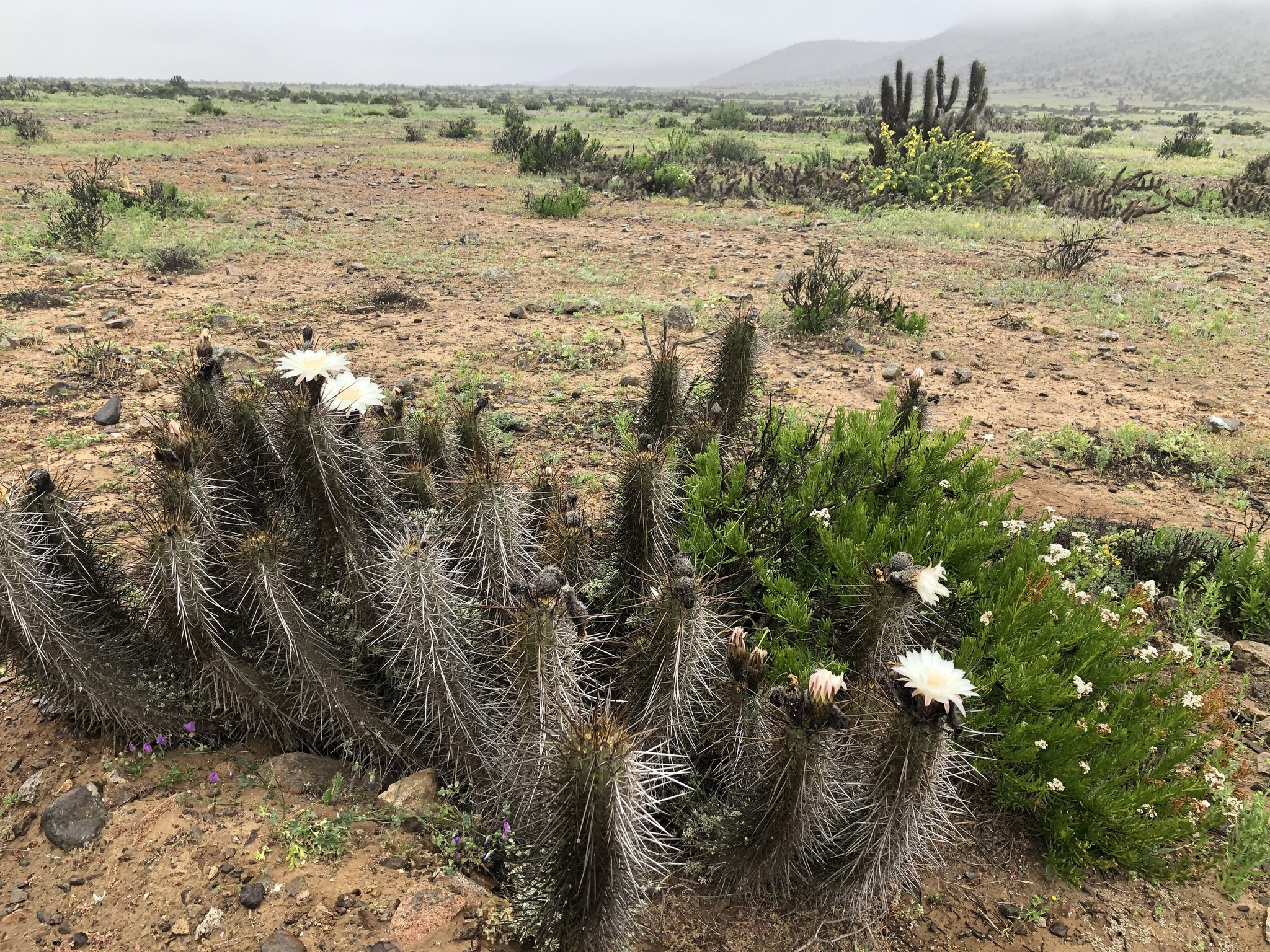
Habitat in Los Choros, La Higuera, Chile

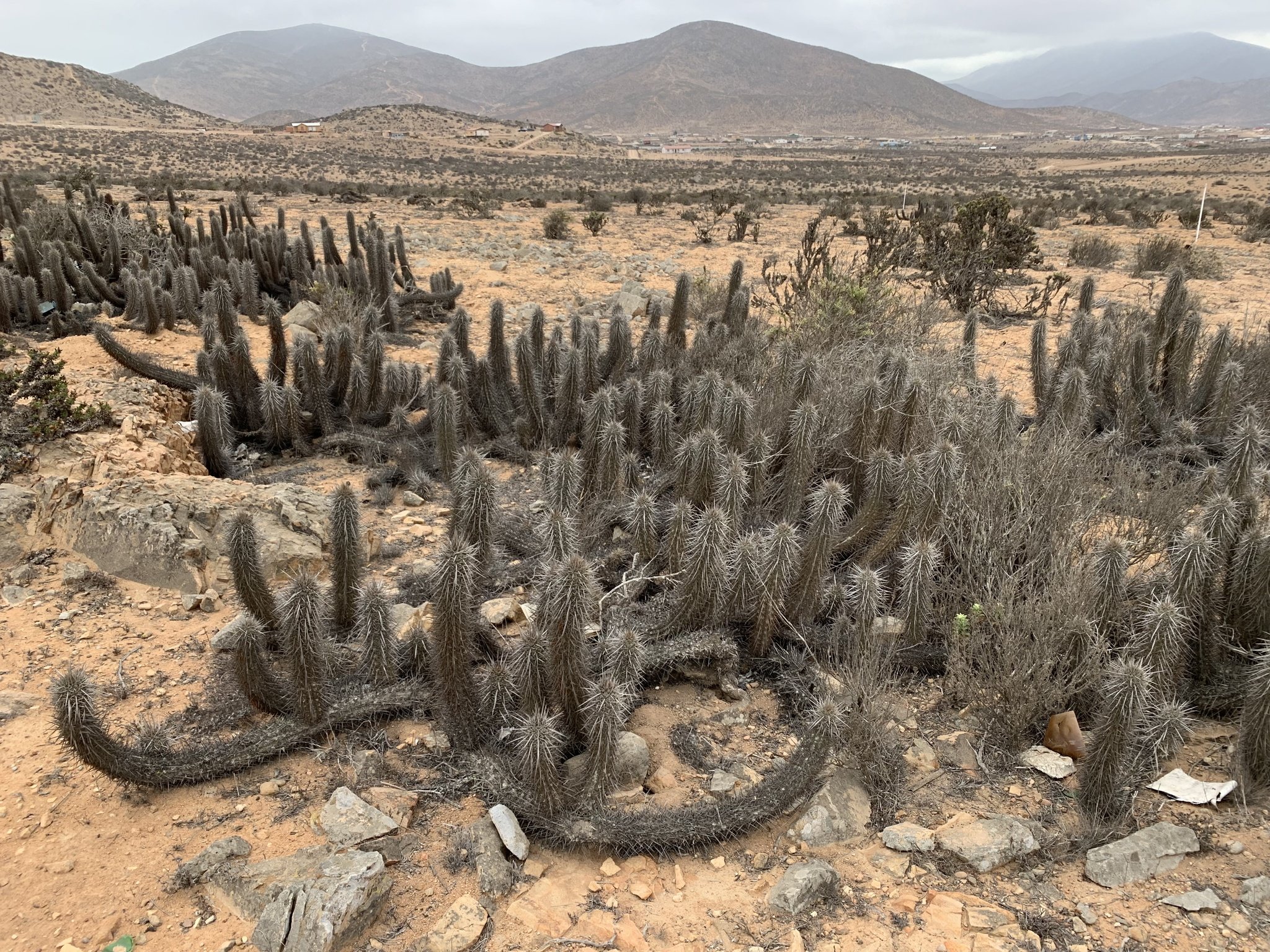
Habitat in La Serena, Chile

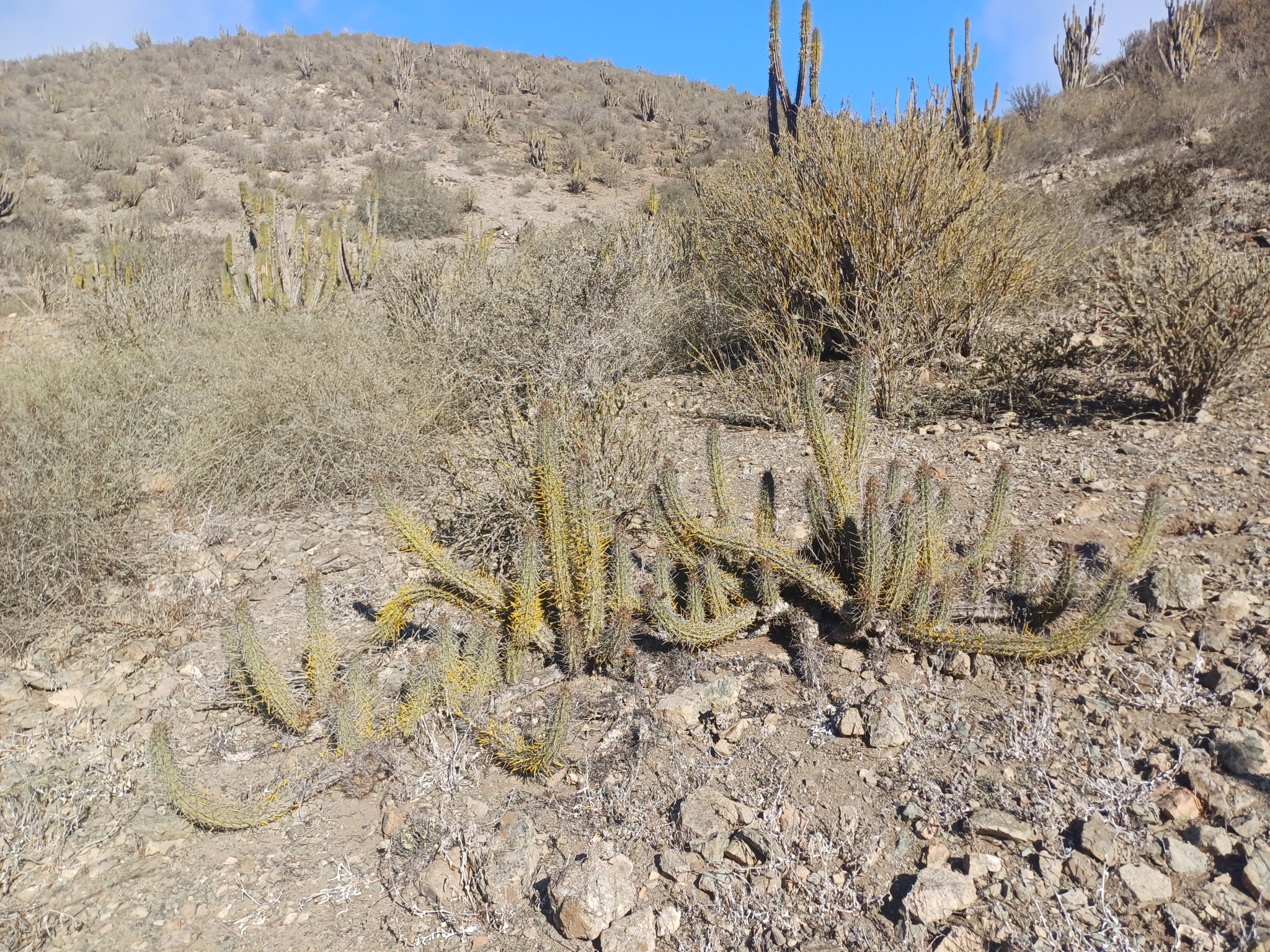
Habitat in Paposo, Taltal, Chile

== Taxonomy ==
The first description as Cereus deserticola by Erich Werdermann was published in 1929. The specific epithet deserticola is derived from the Latin words desertus for 'desert' and -cola for 'dwelling' and refers to its occurrence in very dry areas. Boris O. Schlumpberger placed the species in the genus Leucostele in 2012. Further nomenclatural synonyms are Trichocereus deserticolus (Werderm.) Looser (1929), Trichocereus deserticola (Werderm.) Backeb. (1936) and Echinopsis deserticola (Werderm.) H.Friedrich & G.D.Rowley (1974).
