= Adesmia araujoi =

Scientific classification
- Kingdom: Plantae
- Clade: Tracheophytes
- Clade: Angiosperms
- Clade: Eudicots
- Clade: Rosids
- Order: Fabales
- Family: Fabaceae
- Subfamily: Faboideae
- Genus: Adesmia
- Species: A. araujoi

Binomial name
- Adesmia araujoi Burkart

Species of legume

Adesmia araujoi is an endemic perennial species found in Brazil.
