= Adesmia elegans =

Scientific classification
- Kingdom: Plantae
- Clade: Tracheophytes
- Clade: Angiosperms
- Clade: Eudicots
- Clade: Rosids
- Order: Fabales
- Family: Fabaceae
- Subfamily: Faboideae
- Genus: Adesmia
- Species: A. elegans

Binomial name
- Adesmia elegans Clos

Synonyms
- Patagonium elegans (Clos) Kuntze

Species of legume

Adesmia elegans is a species of legumes. It is found in Chile.
