= Adesmia arenicola =

Scientific classification
- Kingdom: Plantae
- Clade: Tracheophytes
- Clade: Angiosperms
- Clade: Eudicots
- Clade: Rosids
- Order: Fabales
- Family: Fabaceae
- Subfamily: Faboideae
- Genus: Adesmia
- Species: A. arenicola

Binomial name
- Adesmia arenicola (R.E.Fr.) Burkart

Synonyms
- Patagonium arenicola R.E.Fr.

Species of legume

Adesmia arenicola is an endemic perennial shrub found in Argentina.
