= Adesmia resinosa =

Scientific classification
- Kingdom: Plantae
- Clade: Tracheophytes
- Clade: Angiosperms
- Clade: Eudicots
- Clade: Rosids
- Order: Fabales
- Family: Fabaceae
- Subfamily: Faboideae
- Genus: Adesmia
- Species: A. resinosa

Binomial name
- Adesmia resinosa Phil.

Species of legume

Adesmia resinosa is a species of flowering plant in the legume family, Fabaceae. It belongs to the subfamily Faboideae. The species is found in portions of South America, with an example location being La Campana National Park in central Chile as an understory associate of the Chilean wine palm.

== See also ==
- Adesmia balsamica
