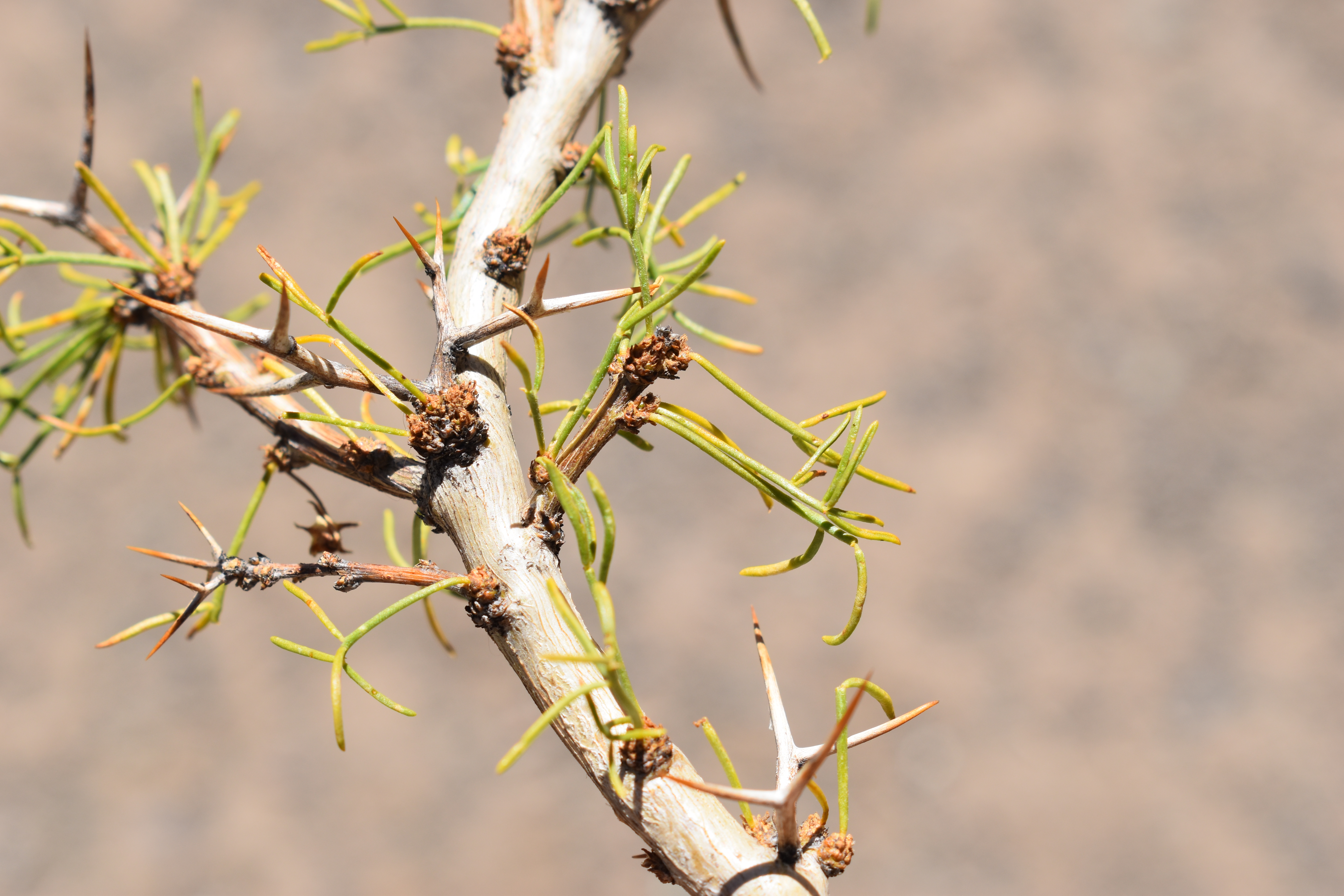

Scientific classification
- Kingdom: Plantae
- Clade: Embryophytes
- Clade: Tracheophytes
- Clade: Spermatophytes
- Clade: Angiosperms
- Clade: Eudicots
- Clade: Rosids
- Order: Fabales
- Family: Fabaceae
- Subfamily: Faboideae
- Genus: Adesmia
- Species: A. pinifolia

Binomial name
- Adesmia pinifolia Gillies ex Hook. & Arn.

Synonyms
- Patagonium pinifolium (Gillies ex Hook. & Arn.) Kuntze

= Adesmia pinifolia =

Species of plant

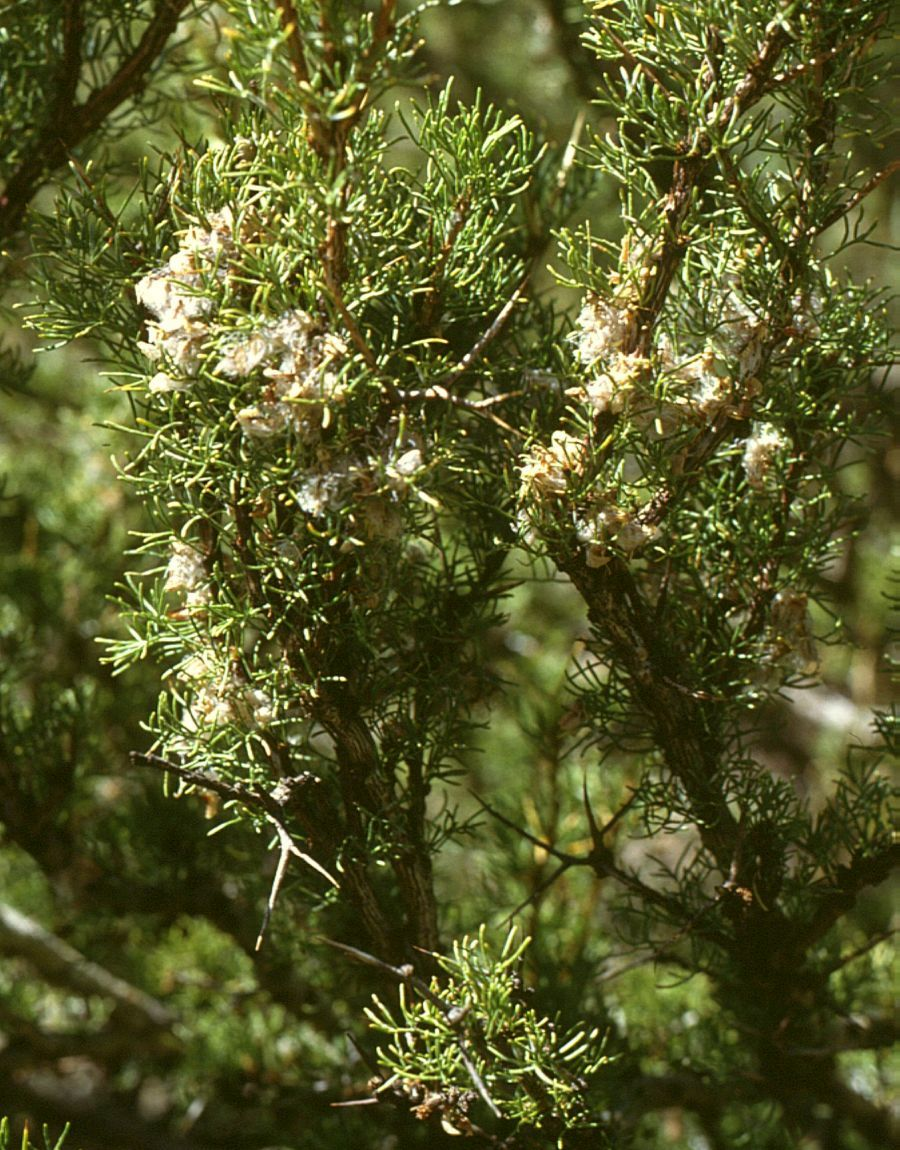
Adesmia pinifolia, legumes (Fabaceae), butterfly flowers (Faboideae) - Argentina, Paso de Uspallata, Puente del Inca, approx. 2700 m s.m.

Adesmia pinifolia is a species of flowering shrub in the genus Adesmia and family fabaceae. It grows in elevated areas in the Andes mountains of Chile and Argentina.

It is referred to as leña amarilla (yellow firewood).
