= Adesmia sulina =

Scientific classification
- Kingdom: Plantae
- Clade: Tracheophytes
- Clade: Angiosperms
- Clade: Eudicots
- Clade: Rosids
- Order: Fabales
- Family: Fabaceae
- Subfamily: Faboideae
- Genus: Adesmia
- Species: A. sulina

Binomial name
- Adesmia sulina Miotto

Species of plant

Adesmia sulina is a species of flowering plant in the genus Adesmia, classified in the tribe Dalbergieae, of the Fabaceae family.

== Distribution ==
Adesmia sulina is native to southern Brazil.

== Taxonomy ==
It was described by Miotto.
