= Adesmia arachnipes =

Scientific classification
- Kingdom: Plantae
- Clade: Tracheophytes
- Clade: Angiosperms
- Clade: Eudicots
- Clade: Rosids
- Order: Fabales
- Family: Fabaceae
- Subfamily: Faboideae
- Genus: Adesmia
- Species: A. arachnipes

Binomial name
- Adesmia arachnipes Clos

Synonyms
- Adesmia oresigena Phil.

Species of legume

Adesmia arachnipes is an endemic perennial herb found in Chile.
