= Adesmia ameghinoi =

Scientific classification
- Kingdom: Plantae
- Clade: Tracheophytes
- Clade: Angiosperms
- Clade: Eudicots
- Clade: Rosids
- Order: Fabales
- Family: Fabaceae
- Subfamily: Faboideae
- Genus: Adesmia
- Species: A. ameghinoi

Binomial name
- Adesmia ameghinoi Speg.

Species of legume

Adesmia ameghinoi is an endemic perennial shrub found in Argentina.
