= Adesmia aegiceras =

Scientific classification
- Kingdom: Plantae
- Clade: Tracheophytes
- Clade: Angiosperms
- Clade: Eudicots
- Clade: Rosids
- Order: Fabales
- Family: Fabaceae
- Subfamily: Faboideae
- Genus: Adesmia
- Species: A. aegiceras

Binomial name
- Adesmia aegiceras Phil.

Synonyms
- Adesmia glanduligera I.M.Johnst.; Adesmia remyana Phil.; Adesmia subumbellata Phil.; Adesmia trijuga var. remyana (Phil.) Burkart; Adesmia trijuga var. robustior Hook. & Arn.; Patagonium aegiceras (Phil.) Kuntze; Patagonium aegiceras (Phil.) Reiche; Patagonium trijugum var. remyanum (Phil.) Reiche

Species of legume

Adesmia aegiceras is a perennial shrub found in Argentina and Chile.
