= Adesmia aspera =

Scientific classification
- Kingdom: Plantae
- Clade: Tracheophytes
- Clade: Angiosperms
- Clade: Eudicots
- Clade: Rosids
- Order: Fabales
- Family: Fabaceae
- Subfamily: Faboideae
- Genus: Adesmia
- Species: A. aspera

Binomial name
- Adesmia aspera Gillies ex Hook. & Arn.

Synonyms
- Patagonium asperum (Gillies ex Hook. & Arn.) Kuntze

Species of legume

Adesmia aspera is a perennial herb which is found from central Chile to western Argentina (Mendoza, Neuquén).
