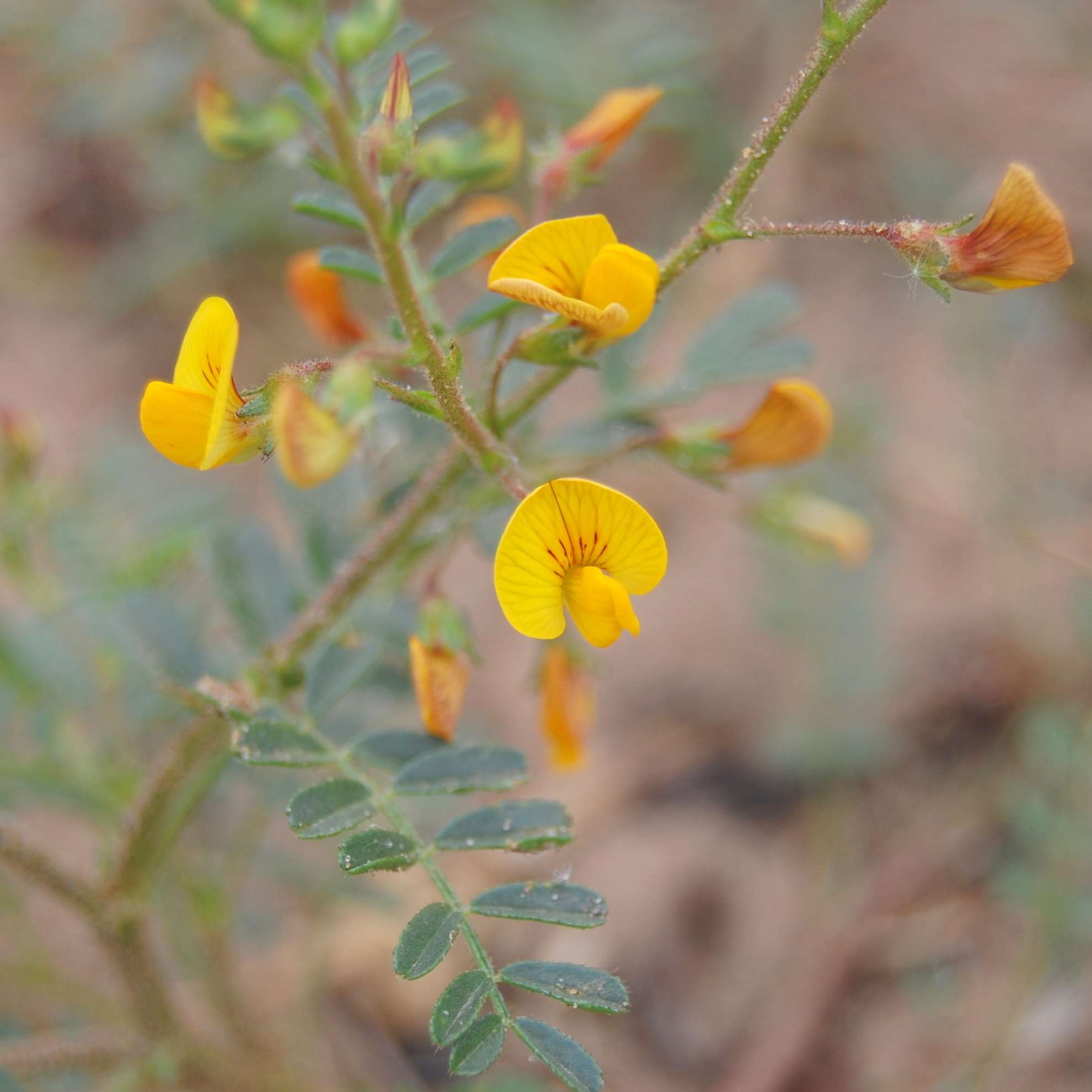
- In Brazil

Scientific classification
- Kingdom: Plantae
- Clade: Embryophytes
- Clade: Tracheophytes
- Clade: Spermatophytes
- Clade: Angiosperms
- Clade: Eudicots
- Clade: Rosids
- Order: Fabales
- Family: Fabaceae
- Subfamily: Faboideae
- Genus: Adesmia
- Species: A. muricata

Binomial name
- Adesmia muricata (Jacq.) DC.

Synonyms
- Adesmia hedysaroides (Schrank) Hauman; Adesmia muricata var. incana (Kuntze) Burkart; Aeschynomene muricata Desv.; Aeschynomene patagonica Steud.; Aeschynomene pimpinellifolia Desv.; Hedysarum muricatum Jacq.; Patagonium muricatum var. incanum Kuntze

= Adesmia muricata =

Species of plant

Adesmia muricata is a species of flowering plant in the legume family, Fabaceae. It was originally described in 1794 as Hedysarum muricatum Jacq.. It is native to Brazil, Argentina and Uruguay.

The following varieties are accepted:

- Adesmia muricata var. muricata
- Adesmia muricata var. affinis (Hook.f.) Burkart
- Adesmia muricata var. dentata (Lag.) Benth.
- Adesmia muricata var. gilliesii (Hook. & Arn.) Burkart
- Adesmia muricata var. rionegrensis Burkart
