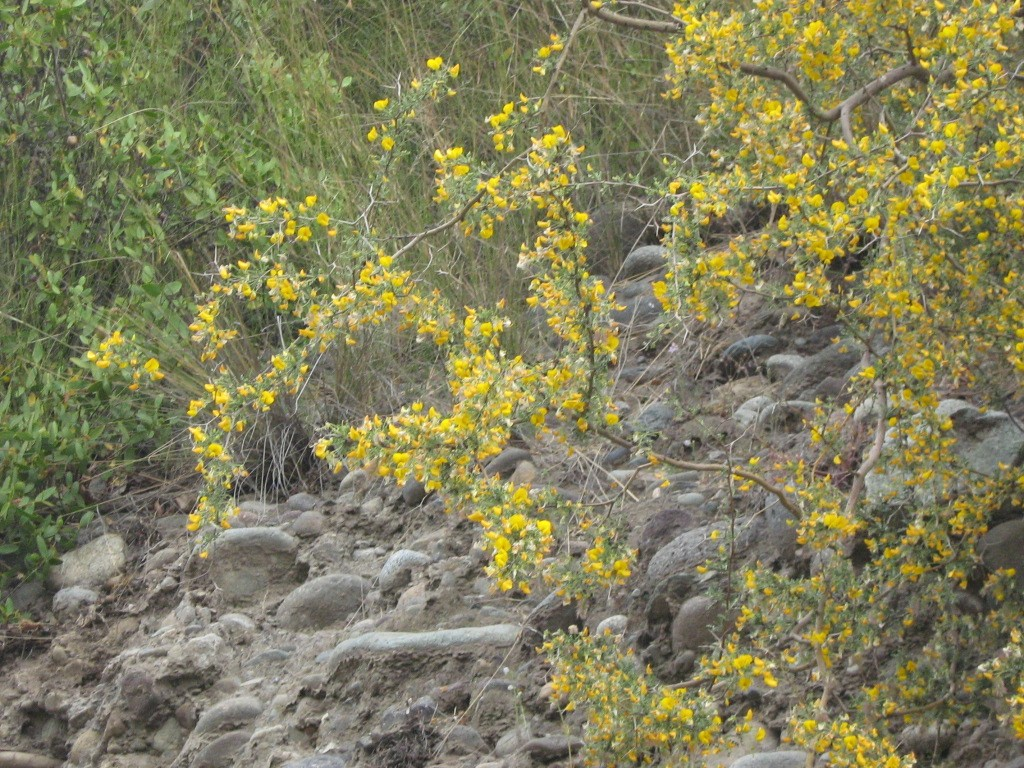
- Adesmia microphylla flowers and leaves

Scientific classification
- Kingdom: Plantae
- Clade: Tracheophytes
- Clade: Angiosperms
- Clade: Eudicots
- Clade: Rosids
- Order: Fabales
- Family: Fabaceae
- Subfamily: Faboideae
- Genus: Adesmia
- Species: A. microphylla

Binomial name
- Adesmia microphylla Hook. & Arn.

= Adesmia microphylla =

Species of plant

Adesmia microphylla, pahuen, is a common shrub in Coastal Chilean Matorral of Central Chile, 400 to 1000 masl., associates with Proustia pungens and Lithraea caustica. This species was merged as A. arborea, a taxon including A. confusa Ulibarri, a distinctive plant with flowers over brachyblasts. The flowers of A. microphylla appear over spines.

== Use ==
As livestock forage.
