= Adesmia argyrophylla =

Scientific classification
- Kingdom: Plantae
- Clade: Tracheophytes
- Clade: Angiosperms
- Clade: Eudicots
- Clade: Rosids
- Order: Fabales
- Family: Fabaceae
- Subfamily: Faboideae
- Genus: Adesmia
- Species: A. argyrophylla

Binomial name
- Adesmia argyrophylla Phill.

Synonyms
- Adesmia furcata Phil.; Patagonium argyrophyllum (Phil.) Kuntze

Species of flowering plant

Adesmia argyrophylla is an endemic perennial shrub found in North and Central Chile.
