= Adesmia araucana =

Scientific classification
- Kingdom: Plantae
- Clade: Tracheophytes
- Clade: Angiosperms
- Clade: Eudicots
- Clade: Rosids
- Order: Fabales
- Family: Fabaceae
- Subfamily: Faboideae
- Genus: Adesmia
- Species: A. araucana

Binomial name
- Adesmia araucana Phil.

Synonyms

Species of legume

Adesmia araucana is an endemic perennial herb found in Chile.
