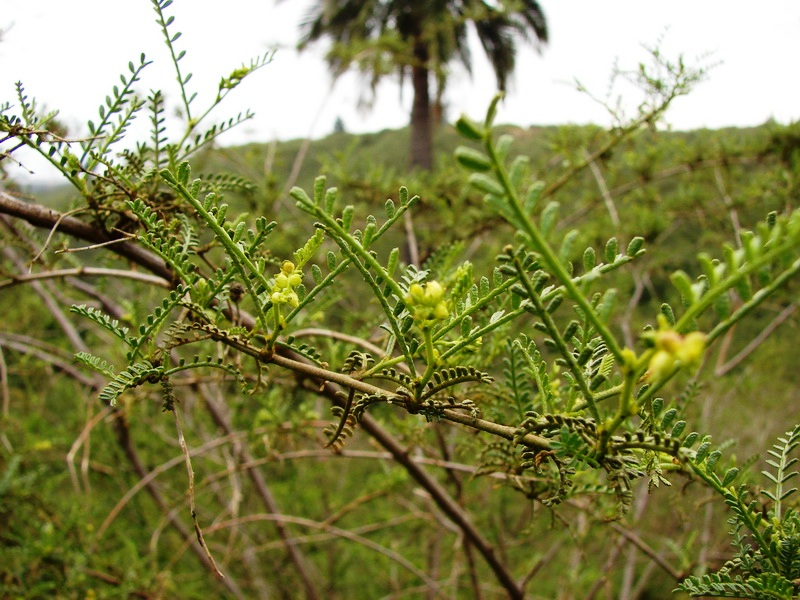

Scientific classification
- Kingdom: Plantae
- Clade: Tracheophytes
- Clade: Angiosperms
- Clade: Eudicots
- Clade: Rosids
- Order: Fabales
- Family: Fabaceae
- Subfamily: Faboideae
- Genus: Adesmia
- Species: A. balsamica

Binomial name
- Adesmia balsamica Bertero ex Colla

= Adesmia balsamica =

Species of legume

Adesmia balsamica is a rare species of flowering plant in the legume family, Fabaceae. It belongs to the sub-family Faboideae. A. balsamica is a small shrub which exudes a fragrant balsamic aroma. The species is found in portions of South America, with an example location being La Campana National Park in Chile.

== See also ==
- Adesmia resinosa
