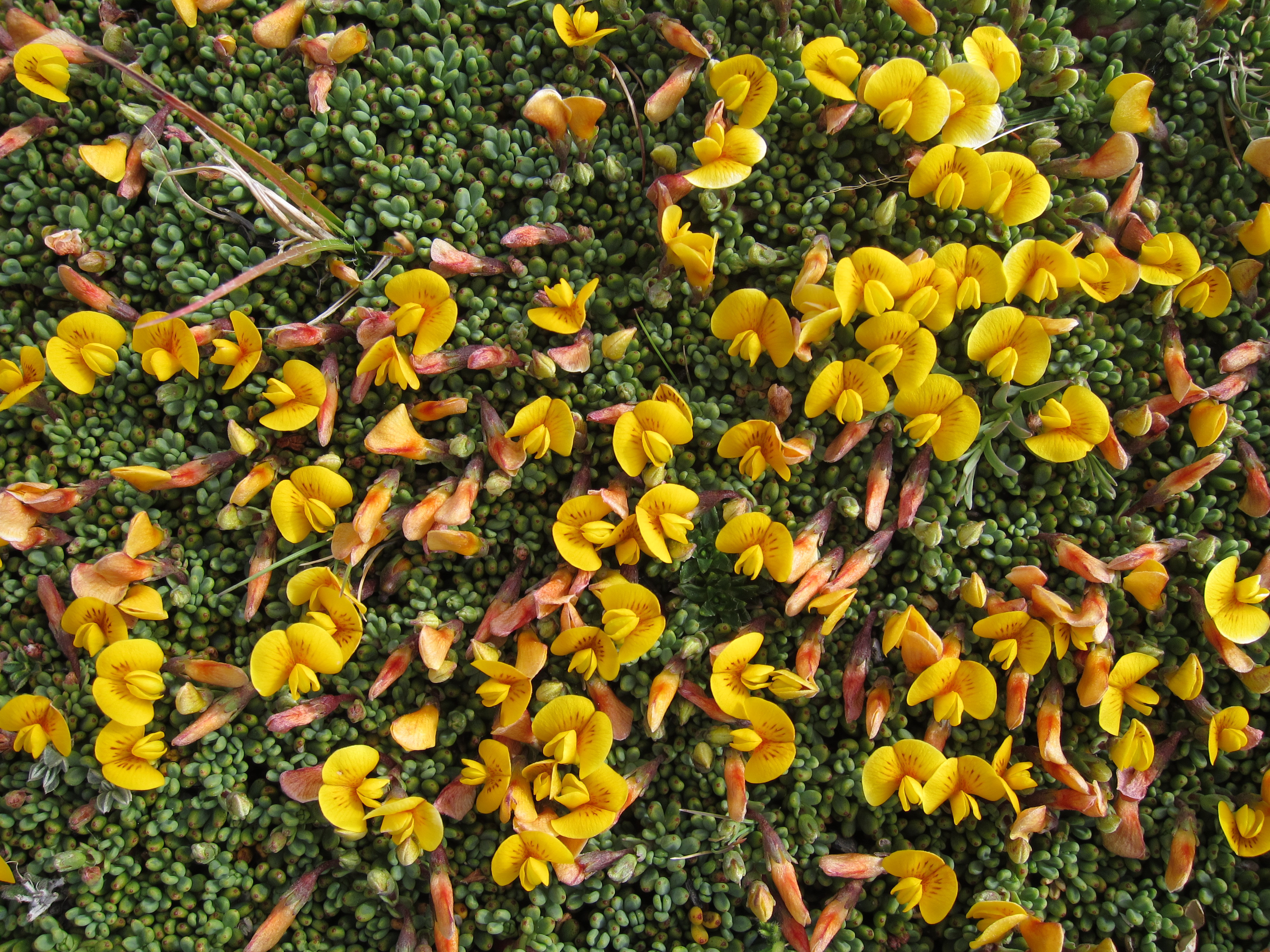
- Adesmia salicornioides

Scientific classification
- Kingdom: Plantae
- Clade: Tracheophytes
- Clade: Angiosperms
- Clade: Eudicots
- Clade: Rosids
- Order: Fabales
- Family: Fabaceae
- Subfamily: Faboideae
- Tribe: Dalbergieae
- Genus: Adesmia; DC. (1825)

Type species
- Adesmia muricata (Jacq.) DC.

Species
- Over 200; see text.

Synonyms
- Heteroloma Desv. ex Rchb. (1828); Patagonium Schrank (1808 publ. 1809); Streptodesmia A.Gray (1853)

= Adesmia (plant) =

Genus of legumes

Adesmia is a genus of flowering plants in the legume family, Fabaceae. It was recently assigned to the informal monophyletic Adesmia clade within the Dalbergieae.

The species range across southern South America, from Peru and southeastern Brazil to Argentina and Chile.

== Species ==
Adesmia comprises the following species:

- Adesmia aconcaguensis Burkart
- Adesmia acuta Burkart
- Adesmia adrianii M.N. Correa
- Adesmia aegiceras Phil.
- Adesmia ameghinoi Speg.
- Adesmia aphanantha Speg.
- Adesmia aphylla Clos
- Adesmia arachnipes Clos
- Adesmia araucana Phil.
- Adesmia araujoi Burkart
- Adesmia arenicola (R.E. Fr.) Burkart
- Adesmia argentea Meyen
- Adesmia argyrophylla Phil.
- Adesmia arillata Miotto
- Adesmia aromatica Burkart
- Adesmia aspera Hook. & Arn.
- Adesmia atacamensis Phil.
- Adesmia atuelensis Burkart
- Adesmia aucaensis Burkart
- Adesmia aueri Burkart
- Adesmia augustii J.F. Macbr.
- Adesmia aurantiaca (Dusen) Burkart
- Adesmia axillaris Phil.
- Adesmia balsamica Colla
- Adesmia bedwellii Skottsb.
- Adesmia bicolor (Poir.) DC.
- Adesmia bijuga Phil.
- Adesmia boelckeana Burkart
- Adesmia bonariensis Burkart
- Adesmia boronioides Hook. f.
- Adesmia brachysemeon Phil.
- Adesmia bracteata Hook. & Arn.
- Adesmia brevivexillata Burkart
- Adesmia burkartii M.N. Correa
- Adesmia cabrerae Burkart
- Adesmia caespitosa Phil.
- Adesmia calycicomosa Burkart
- Adesmia candida Hook. f.
- Adesmia canescens Phil.
- Adesmia capitellata (Clos) Hauman
- Adesmia ciliata Vogel
- Adesmia codonocalyx G.F. Grandjot
- Adesmia colinensis Phil.
- Adesmia coluteoides Hook. & Arn.
- Adesmia concinna Phil.
- Adesmia conferta Hook. & Arn.
- Adesmia confusa Ulibarri
- Adesmia coquimbensis Burkart
- Adesmia cordobensis Burkart
- Adesmia coronilloides Hook. & Arn.
- Adesmia corymbosa Clos
- Adesmia crassicaulis Phil.
- Adesmia cuneata Mey. ex Vog.
- Adesmia curvifolia Clos
- Adesmia cytisoides Griseb.
- Adesmia darapskyana Phil.
- Adesmia davilae Phil.
- Adesmia denticulata Clos
- Adesmia denudata Phil.
- Adesmia dessaueri (Reiche) Ulibarri
- Adesmia dichotoma Clos
- Adesmia digitata Burkart
- Adesmia disperma Phil.
- Adesmia dumosa Phil.
- Adesmia echinus C. Presl
- Adesmia elata Clos
- Adesmia elegans Clos
- Adesmia emarginata Clos
- Adesmia eremophila Phil.
- Adesmia erinacea Phil.
- Adesmia exilis Clos
- Adesmia fabrisii Burkart
- Adesmia filicaulis Phil.
- Adesmia filifolia Clos
- Adesmia filipes A. Gray
- Adesmia friesii Ulibarri
- Adesmia frigida Phil.
- Adesmia fuentesii G.F. Grandjot
- Adesmia gayana Phil.
- Adesmia germainii Phil.
- Adesmia glandulifera (Rendle) Skottsb.
- Adesmia glauca Phil.
- Adesmia glaucescens Phil.
- Adesmia glomerula Clos
  - var. australior Burkart
  - var. glomerula Clos
- Adesmia glutinosa Hook. & Arn.
- Adesmia godoyae Reiche
- Adesmia gracilis Vogel
- Adesmia gracillima I.M. Johnst.
- Adesmia graminidea Speg.
- Adesmia grandiflora Gillies
- Adesmia guttulifera Sandwith
- Adesmia hemisphaerica Hauman
- Adesmia hirsuta Phil.
- Adesmia hispidula (Lag.) DC.
- Adesmia horrida Hook. & Arn.
- Adesmia hunzikeri Burkart
- Adesmia hystrix Phil.
- Adesmia incana Vogel
- Adesmia inconspicua Phil.
- Adesmia jilesiana Burkart
- Adesmia kieslingii Ulibarri
- Adesmia kingii Phil.
- Adesmia lanata Hook. f.
- Adesmia latifolia (Spreng.) Vogel
- Adesmia laxa Clos
- Adesmia leiocarpa Hook. & Arn.
- Adesmia leptobotrys Burkart
- Adesmia lihuelensis Burkart
- Adesmia littoralis Burkart
- Adesmia longipes Phil.
- Adesmia longiseta DC.
- Adesmia lotoides Hook. f.
- Adesmia loudonia Hook. & Arn.
- Adesmia macrostachya Benth.
- Adesmia medinae (Reiche) Ulibarri
- Adesmia melanocaulos Phil.
- Adesmia melanthes Phil.
- Adesmia mendozana Ulibarri
- Adesmia micrantha Phil.
- Adesmia microcalyx Phil.
- Adesmia microphylla Hook. & Arn.
- Adesmia minor (Hook. & Arn.) Burkart
- Adesmia miraflorensis J. Remy
- Adesmia monosperma Clos
- Adesmia montana Phil.
- Adesmia mucronata Hook. & Arn.
- Adesmia multicuspis Clos
- Adesmia muricata (Jacq.) DC.
- Adesmia nana (Chodat & Wilczek) Hauman
- Adesmia nanolignea Burkart
- Adesmia neglecta M.N. Correa
- Adesmia nordenskioldii (R.E. Fr.) Cardenas
- Adesmia obcordata Clos
- Adesmia obovata Clos
- Adesmia obscura Clos
- Adesmia occulta (R.E. Fr.) Burkart
- Adesmia odontophylla Phil.
- Adesmia pampeana Speg.
- Adesmia papposa (Lag.) DC.
- Adesmia paranensis Burkart
- Adesmia parviflora Clos
- Adesmia parvifolia Phil.
- Adesmia patagonica Speg.
- Adesmia patancana Ulbr.
- Adesmia pauciflora Vogel
- Adesmia pearcei Phil.
- Adesmia pedicellata Hook. & Arn.
- Adesmia pentaphylla Phil.
- Adesmia peraltae (Reiche) Ulibarri
- Adesmia phylloidea Clos
- Adesmia pinifolia Hook. & Arn.
- Adesmia pirionii I.M. Johnst.
- Adesmia polygaloides (Chodat) Burkart
- Adesmia polyphylla Phil.
- Adesmia propinqua Clos
- Adesmia prostrata Clos
- Adesmia pseudincana Burkart
- Adesmia pseudogrisea Burkart
- Adesmia psoraleoides Vogel
- Adesmia pumahuasiana Ulibarri
- Adesmia pumila Hook. f.
- Adesmia punctata (Poir.) DC.
- Adesmia pungens Clos
- Adesmia pusilla Phil.
- Adesmia quadripinnata (Hicken) Burkart
- Adesmia radicifolia Clos
- Adesmia ragonesei Burkart
- Adesmia rahmeri Phil.
- Adesmia ramosissima Phil.
- Adesmia reclinata O. Muniz
- Adesmia reitziana Burkart
- Adesmia renjifoana (Reiche) Ulibarri
- Adesmia resinosa Phil.
- Adesmia retrofracta Hook. & Arn.
- Adesmia retusa Griseb.
- Adesmia riojana Burkart
- Adesmia rocinhensis Burkart
- Adesmia rubroviridis Burkart
- Adesmia ruiz-lealii M.N. Correa
- Adesmia salamancensis Burkart
- Adesmia salicornioides Speg.
- Adesmia sandwithii Burkart
- Adesmia sanjuanensis Burkart
- Adesmia schickendanztii Griseb.
- Adesmia schneideri Phil.
- Adesmia securigerifolia Herter
- Adesmia serrana M.N. Correa
- Adesmia sessiliflora Phil.
- Adesmia silvestrii Speg.
- Adesmia smithiae DC.
- Adesmia spinosissima Vogel
- Adesmia spuma Burkart
- Adesmia stenocaulon Hauman
- Adesmia subnuda (A. Gray) Burkart
- Adesmia subsericea (Chodat & Wilczek) Hauman
- Adesmia subterranea Clos
- Adesmia suffocata Hook. f.
- Adesmia sulina Hook. & Arn.
- Adesmia tehuelcha Speg.
- Adesmia tenella Hook. & Arn.
- Adesmia tomentosa Meyen
- Adesmia torcae Phil.
- Adesmia trifoliata Phil.
- Adesmia trifoliolata Hook. & Arn.
- Adesmia trijuga Hook. & Arn.
- Adesmia tristis Vogel
- Adesmia tucumanensis Burkart
- Adesmia tunuianica Burkart
- Adesmia unifoliolata Skottsb.
- Adesmia uspallatensis Hook. & Arn.
- Adesmia verrucosa Meyen
- Adesmia villosa Hook. f.
- Adesmia virens Phil.
- Adesmia viscida Savi
- Adesmia viscidissima Johnston
- Adesmia viscosa Hook. & Arn.
- Adesmia volckmannii Phil.
- Adesmia zoellneri Ulibarri
