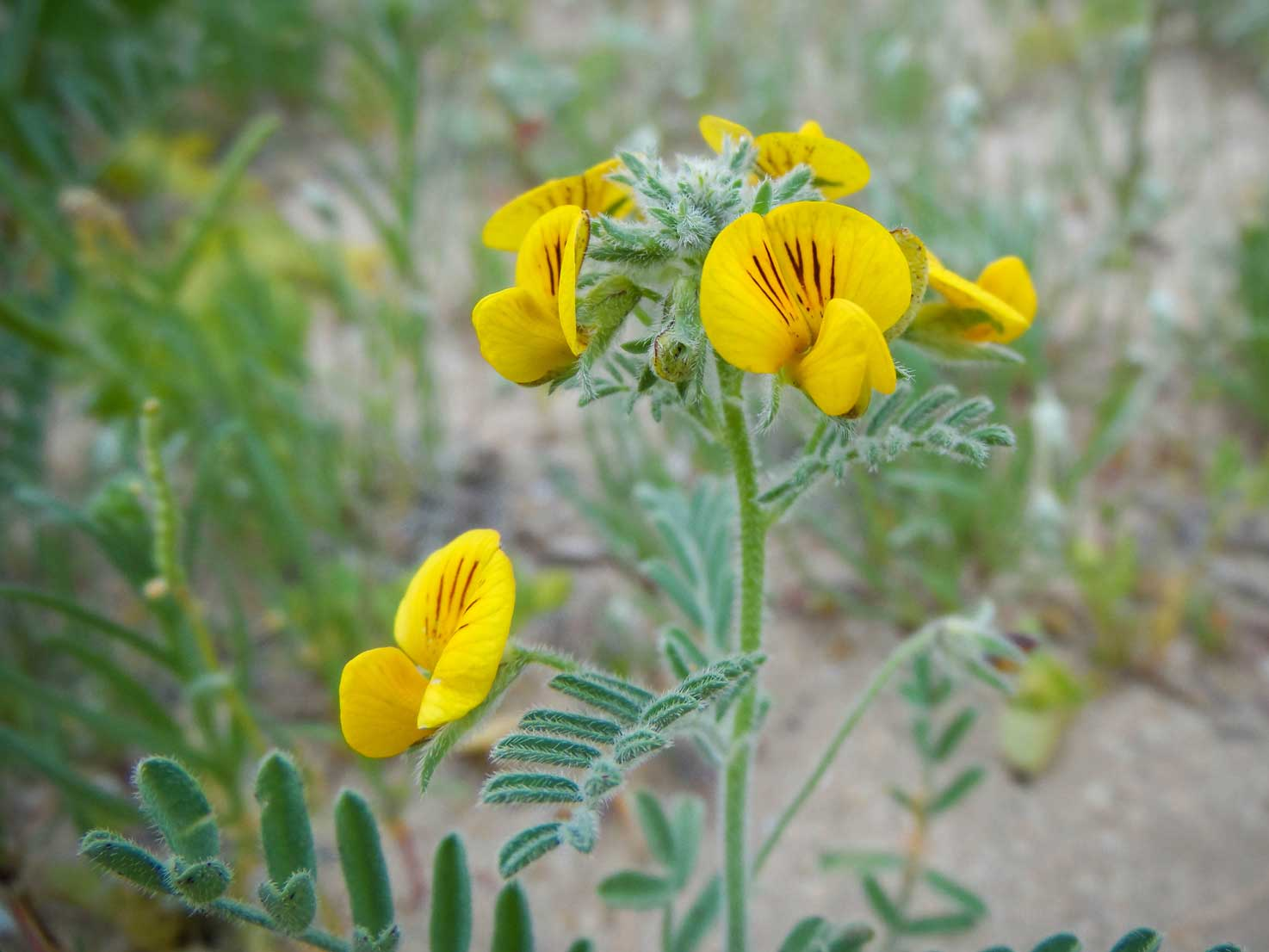
- In Llanos de Challe National Park, Chile

Scientific classification
- Kingdom: Plantae
- Clade: Tracheophytes
- Clade: Angiosperms
- Clade: Eudicots
- Clade: Rosids
- Order: Fabales
- Family: Fabaceae
- Subfamily: Faboideae
- Genus: Adesmia
- Species: A. argentea

Binomial name
- Adesmia argentea Meyen

Synonyms
- Patagonium argenteum (Meyen) Kuntze; Adesmia cinerea Clos; Patagonium cinereum (Clos) Kuntze

= Adesmia argentea =

Species of legume

Adesmia argenta is an endemic perennial shrub native to northern Chile.
