= Cochemiea viridiflora =

Scientific classification
- Kingdom: Plantae
- Clade: Tracheophytes
- Clade: Angiosperms
- Clade: Eudicots
- Order: Caryophyllales
- Family: Cactaceae
- Subfamily: Cactoideae
- Genus: Cochemiea
- Species: C. viridiflora

Binomial name
- Cochemiea viridiflora (Britton & Rose) P.B.Breslin & Majure

Synonyms
- Chilita viridiflora (Britton & Rose) Orcutt 1926; Fimbriatocactus viridiflorus (Britton & Rose) Guiggi 2023; Mammillaria viridiflora (Britton & Rose) Boed. 1933; Mammillaria wrightii subsp. viridiflora (Britton & Rose) Lodé i2022; Mammillaria wrightii var. viridiflora (Britton & Rose) W.T.Marshall 1950; Neomammillaria viridiflora Britton & Rose 1923; Mammillaria chavezei Cowper 1963; Mammillaria orestera L.D.Benson 1969

Species of cactus

Cochemiea viridiflora, commonly known as the greenflower nipple cactus or the fishhook pincushion, is a species of Cochemiea found in Southern United States.

== Description ==
Cochemiea viridiflora grow solitary with a thick succulent root. Stems are flat-topped, spherical, or short cylindrical with 5–17 mm (0.20–0.67 in) tubercles. Areoles have white or brown-and-white spines, featuring 1-4 central spines and 13-31 hooked radial spines. Flowers are cream to greenish-white or rose pink with a pink midstripe, measuring 1.5 cm–3.9 cm × 1.2 cm–4.2 cm (0.59 in–1.54 in × 0.47 in–1.65 in). Tepals have long fringed margins. Fruits are green or purple, ovoid or obovoid, and 6 mm–22 mm × 4 mm–13 mm (0.24 in–0.87 in × 0.16 in–0.51 in) in size. Seeds are dark brown and reticulated. The chromosome count is 2n=22.

== Distribution ==
Plants are found growing in central Arizona near Prescott and I-10 from near Santa Rita in New Mexico in stone crevices and around boulders in grasslands, interior chaparral, pinyon-juniper and oak woodlands at elevations from 800 to 2,000 m (2,600 to 6,600 ft).
