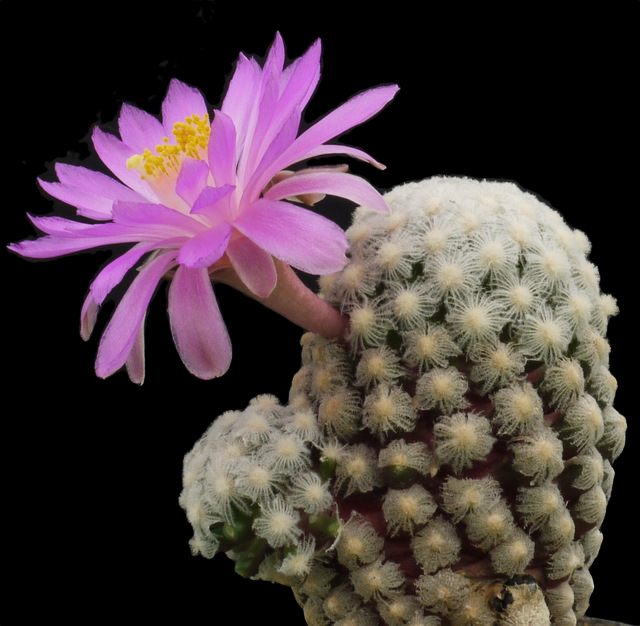

Conservation status
- Critically Endangered (IUCN 3.1)

Scientific classification
- Kingdom: Plantae
- Clade: Embryophytes
- Clade: Tracheophytes
- Clade: Spermatophytes
- Clade: Angiosperms
- Clade: Eudicots
- Order: Caryophyllales
- Family: Cactaceae
- Subfamily: Cactoideae
- Genus: Cochemiea
- Species: C. theresae

Binomial name
- Cochemiea theresae (Cutak) Doweld

Synonyms
- Mammillaria saboae var. theresae (Cutak) G.D.Rowley 1979; Mammillaria theresae Cutak 1967

= Cochemiea theresae =

Species of cactus

Cochemiea theresae is a species of cactus in the subfamily Cactoideae.

== Description ==
Cochemiea theresae typically grows solitary with minimal branching. The spherical to cylindrical, olive-green shoots reach 4 centimeters in height and 1 to 3 centimeters in diameter, tapering into a strong taproot. The sparsely woolly axillae are between cylindrical warts. It lacks a central spine, but has 22 to 30 translucent white to yellowish-white radial spines, each up to 2 millimeters long.

The purplish flowers are funnel-shaped, 3.5 to 4.5 centimeters long, and 3 centimeters in diameter. The club-shaped fruits are embedded in the plant body and grow up to 10 millimeters long, containing black seeds. The seeds are released at the death of the plant after the disintegration of the old stem.

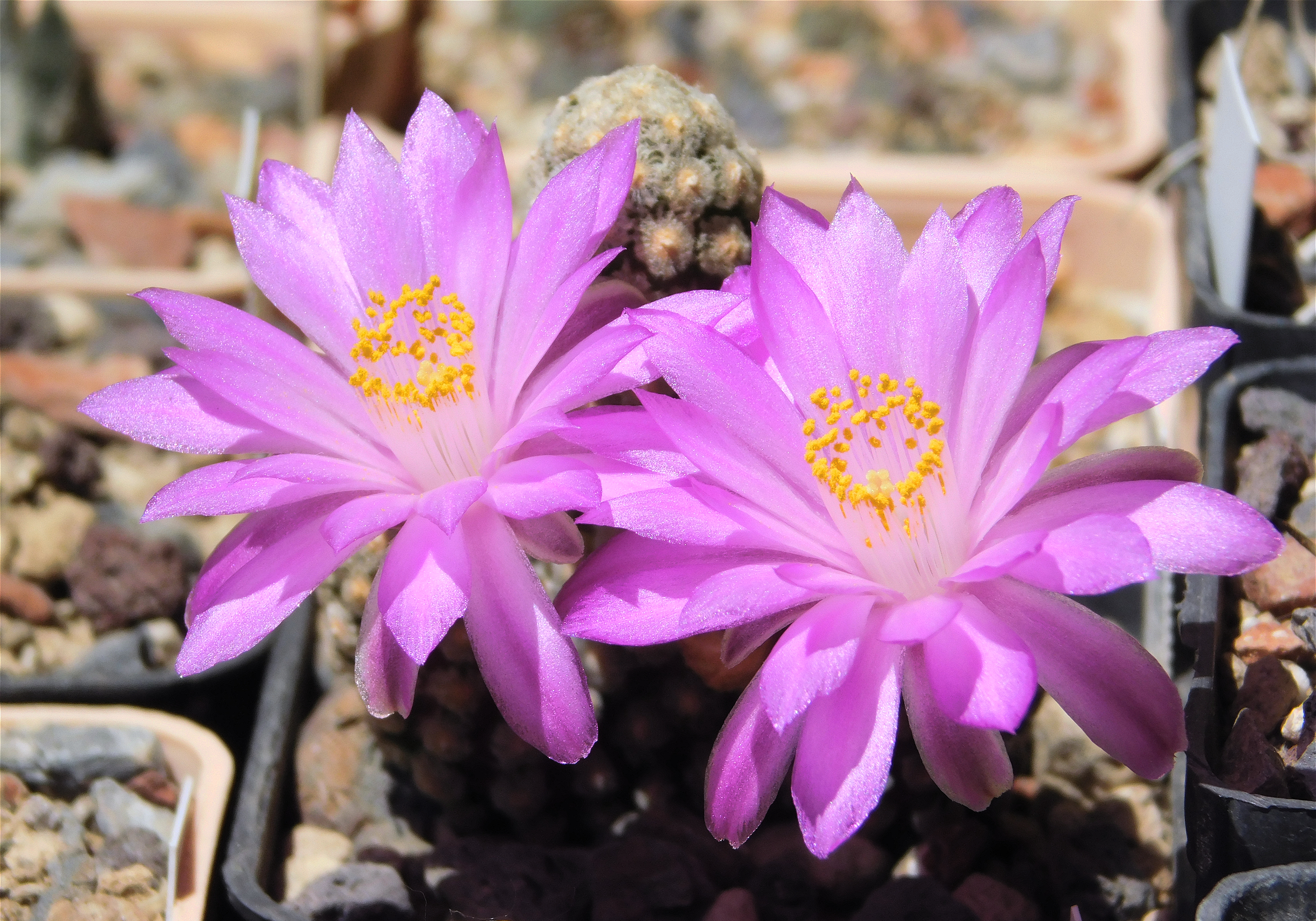
Flowers

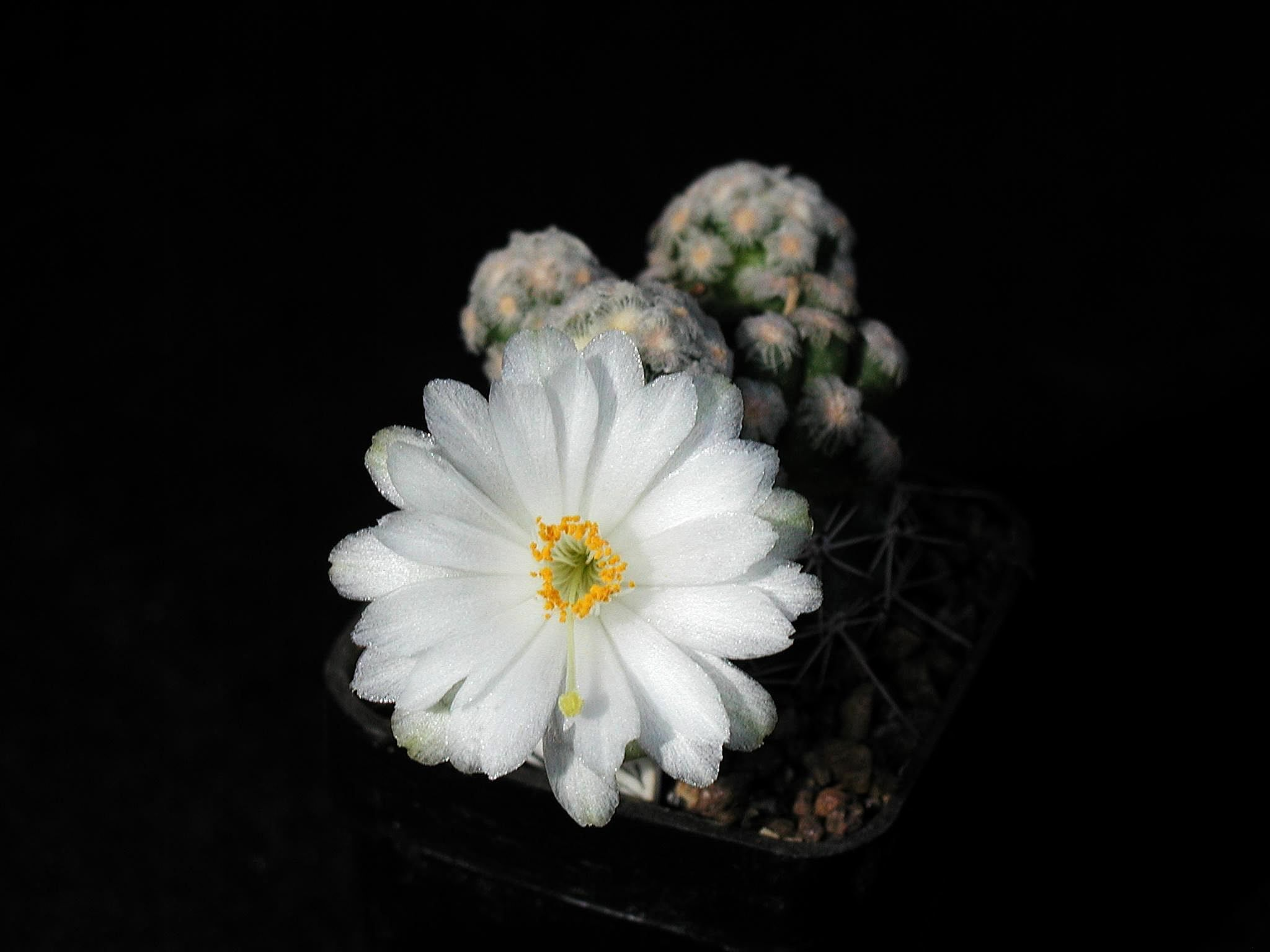
White flowers

== Distribution ==
Cochemiea theresae is found in the Mexican states of Durango and Zacatecas growing in moss patches over limestone rock formations and in grassland with nearby pine-oak forest.

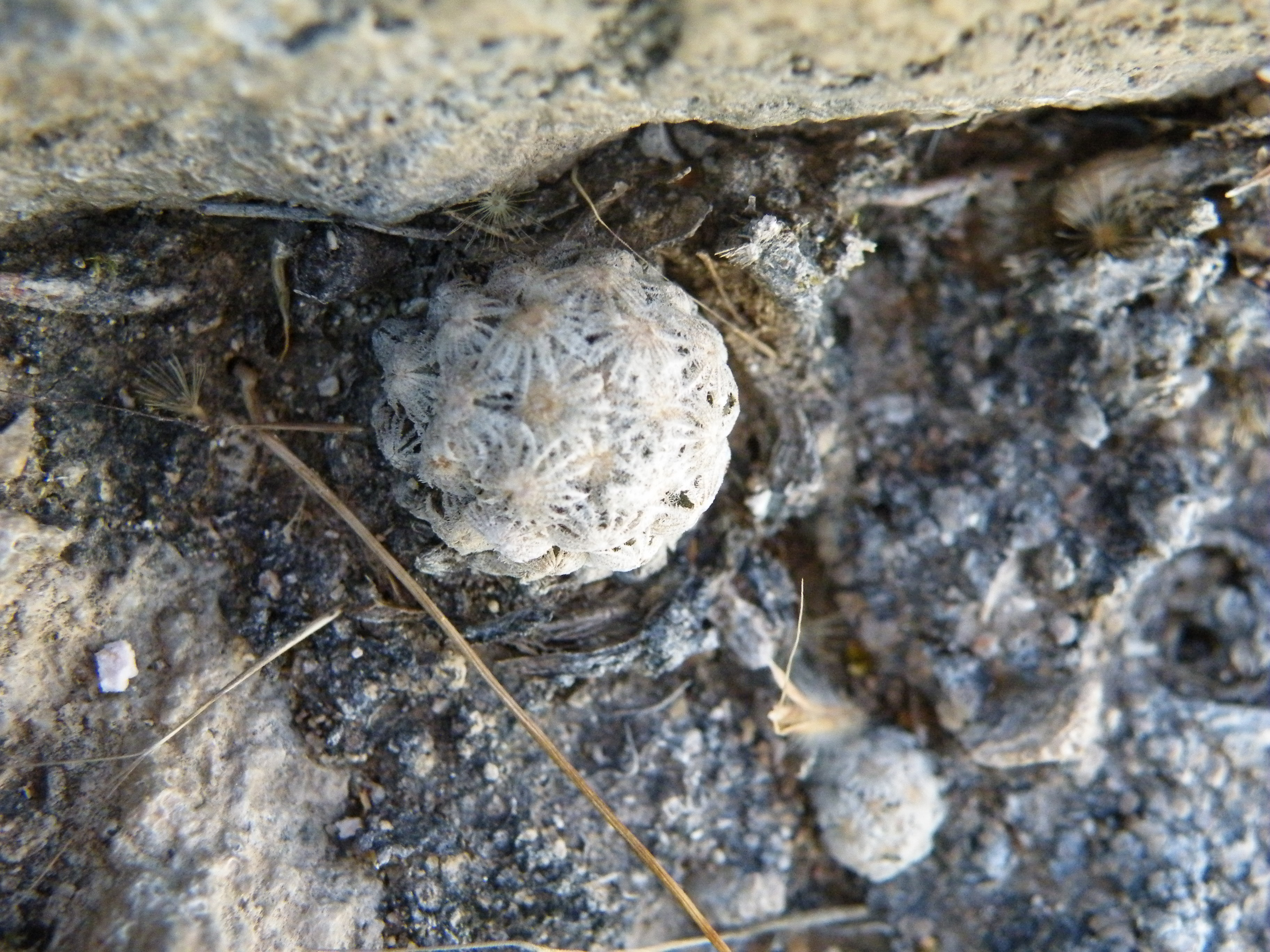
Plant growing in Coneto Pass, Durango

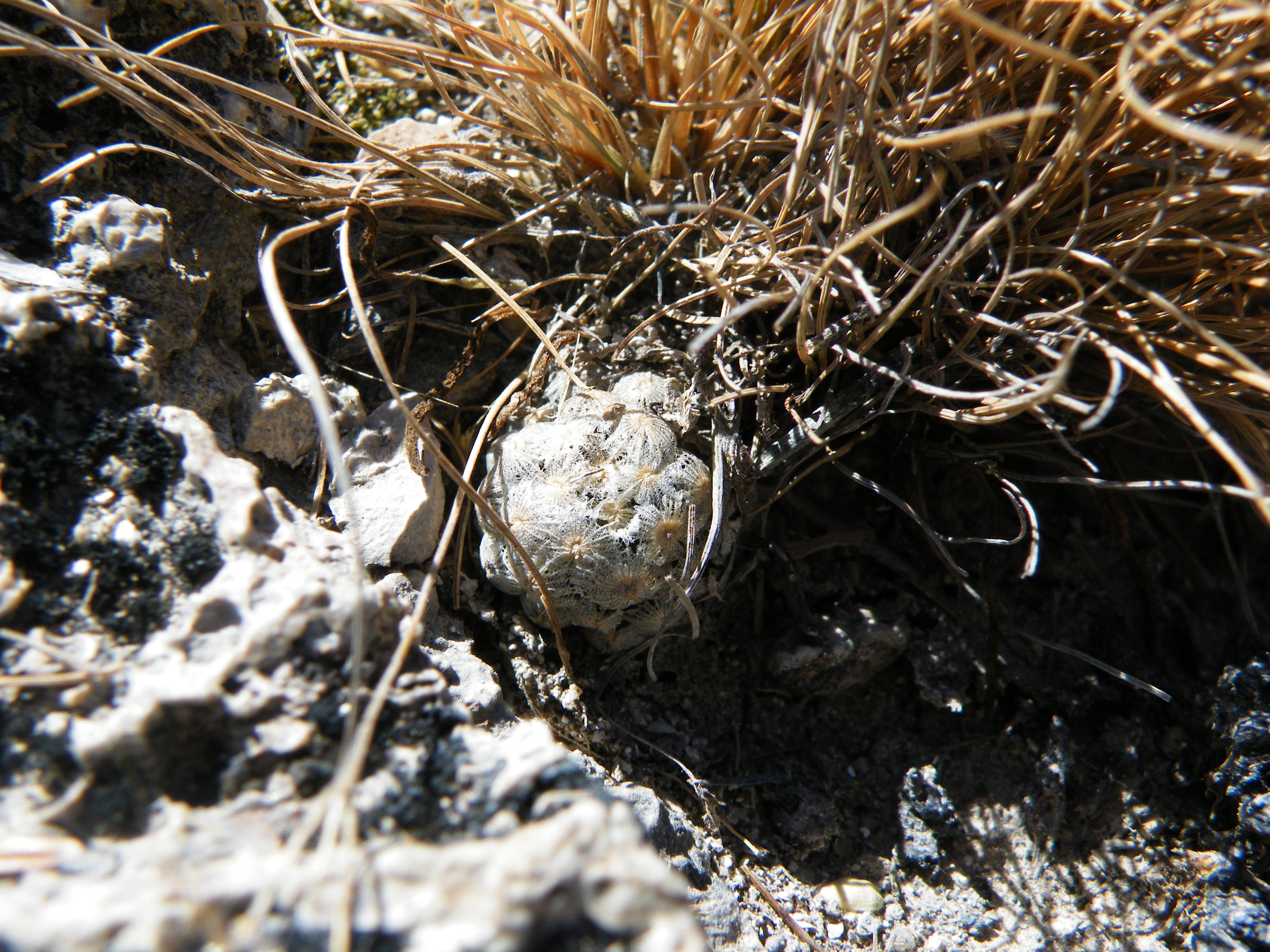
Plant growing in habitat in Coneto Pass, Durango

== Taxonomy ==
Cochemiea theresae is found in the Sierra Madre Occidental of northwest Mexico, in Durango, and was discovered in 1966 by American Therese Bock near Conetop Pass at 2,100 to 2,500 meters elevation. Originally described as Mammillaria theresae by Ladislaus Cutak in 1967, the species honors Therese Bock, who discovered it. Alexander Borissovitch Doweld reclassified it into the genus Cochemiea in 2000.
