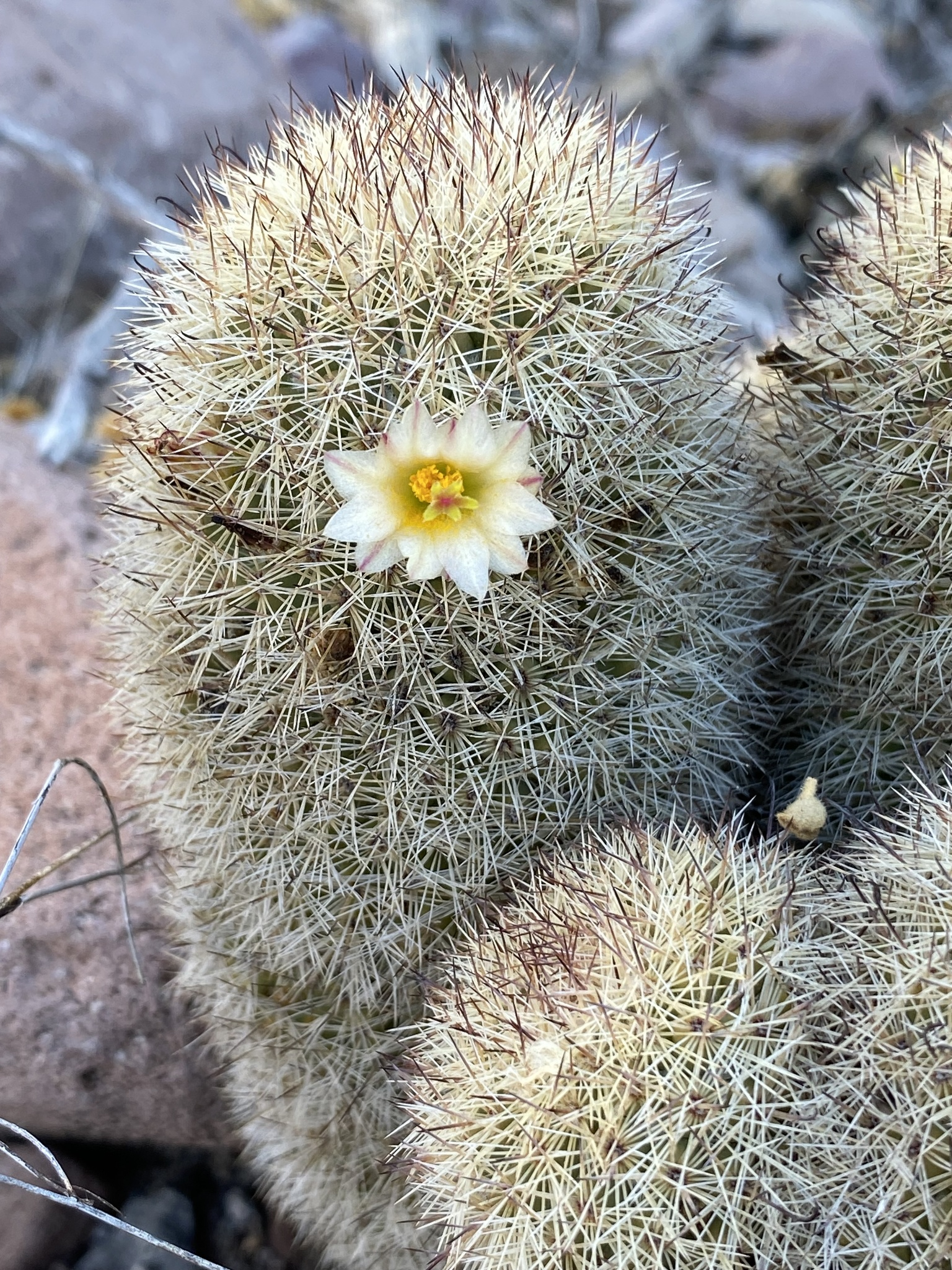

Scientific classification
- Kingdom: Plantae
- Clade: Tracheophytes
- Clade: Angiosperms
- Clade: Eudicots
- Order: Caryophyllales
- Family: Cactaceae
- Subfamily: Cactoideae
- Genus: Cochemiea
- Species: C. estebanensis

Binomial name
- Cochemiea estebanensis (G.E.Linds.) P.B.Breslin & Majure

Synonyms
- Cochemiea dioica subsp. estebanensis (G.E.Linds.) Doweld 2000; Mammillaria angelensis var. estebanensis (G.E.Linds.) Repp. 1987; Mammillaria dioica subsp. estebanensis (G.E.Linds.) D.R.Hunt 1998; Mammillaria dioica f. estebanensis (G.E.Linds.) Neutel. 1986; Mammillaria estebanensis G.E.Linds. 1967

= Cochemiea estebanensis =

Species of cactus

Cochemiea estebanensis is a species of Cochemiea found in Mexico.

== Description ==
Cochemiea estebanensis grows either solitary or in groups. Its grey-green, cylindrical shoots, with rounded apexes, can reach up to 50 cm (20 in) in height and 6 to 10 cm (2.4 to 3.9 in) in diameter. The firm, pyramidal warts lack milky juice. The axillae are wool-covered with 5 to 8 bristles, each up to 0.8 cm (0.31 in) long. There is one central spine, brown with a dark tip, straight or hooked, measuring between 0.4 and 1.5 cm (0.16 and 0.59 in) long. The plant has 15 to 22 radial spines that are needle-like, straight, and range in color from brownish to gold or white, each up to 1 cm (0.39 in) long.

The funnel- or bell-shaped flowers are white, up to 2 cm (0.79 in) long, and 2.5 cm (0.98 in) in diameter. The red fruits contain black seeds.

== Distribution ==
Cochemiea estebanensis is found in the Mexican state of Baja California, specifically on Isla San Esteban and the San Lorenzo Archipelago.

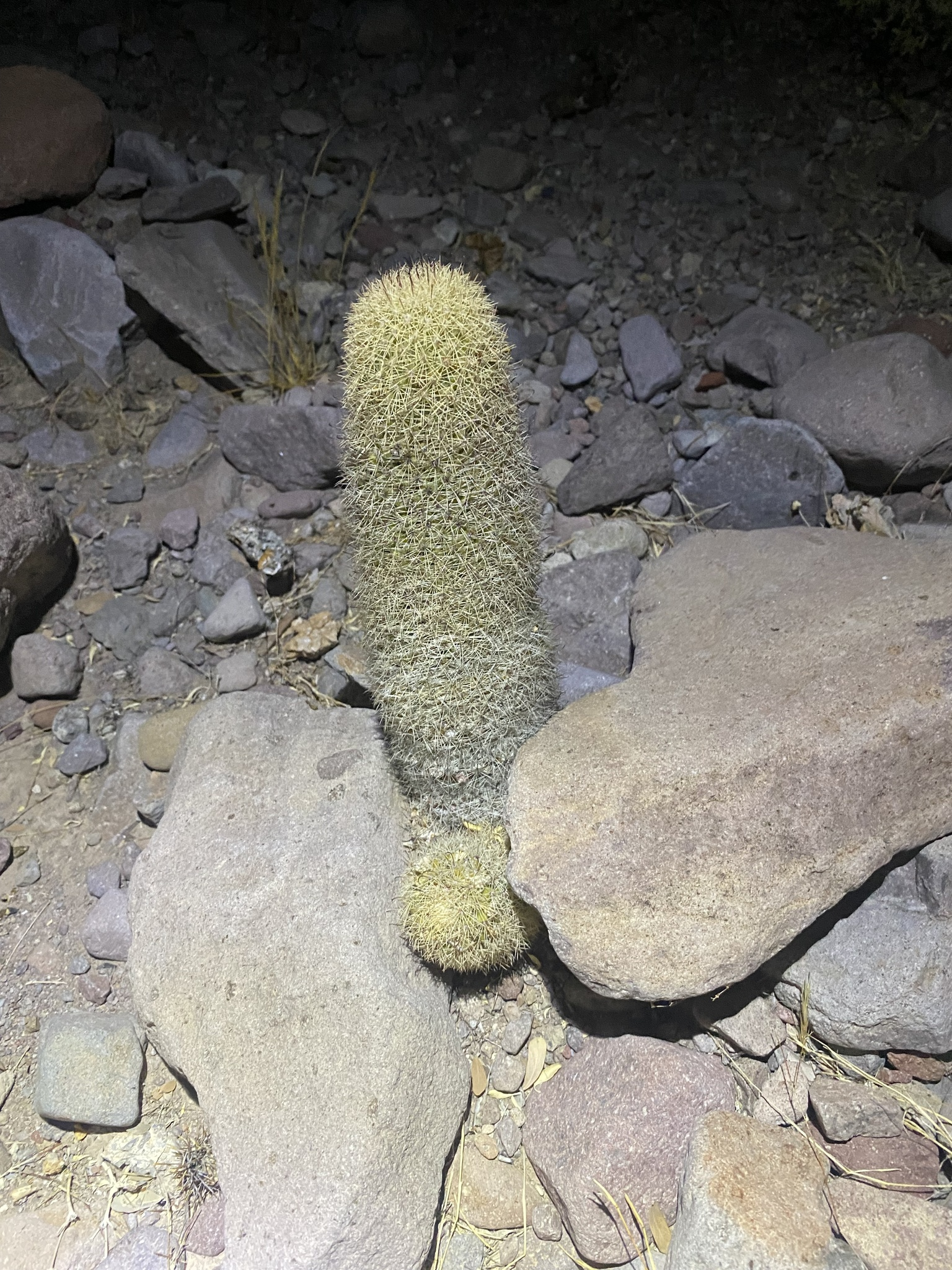
Plant growing in habitat in Isla San Esteban

== Taxonomy ==
Originally described as Mammillaria estebanensis by George Edmund Lindsay in 1967, the species name "estebanensis" refers to Isla San Esteban. In 2021, Peter B. Breslin and Lucas C. Majure reclassified it into the genus Cochemiea.
