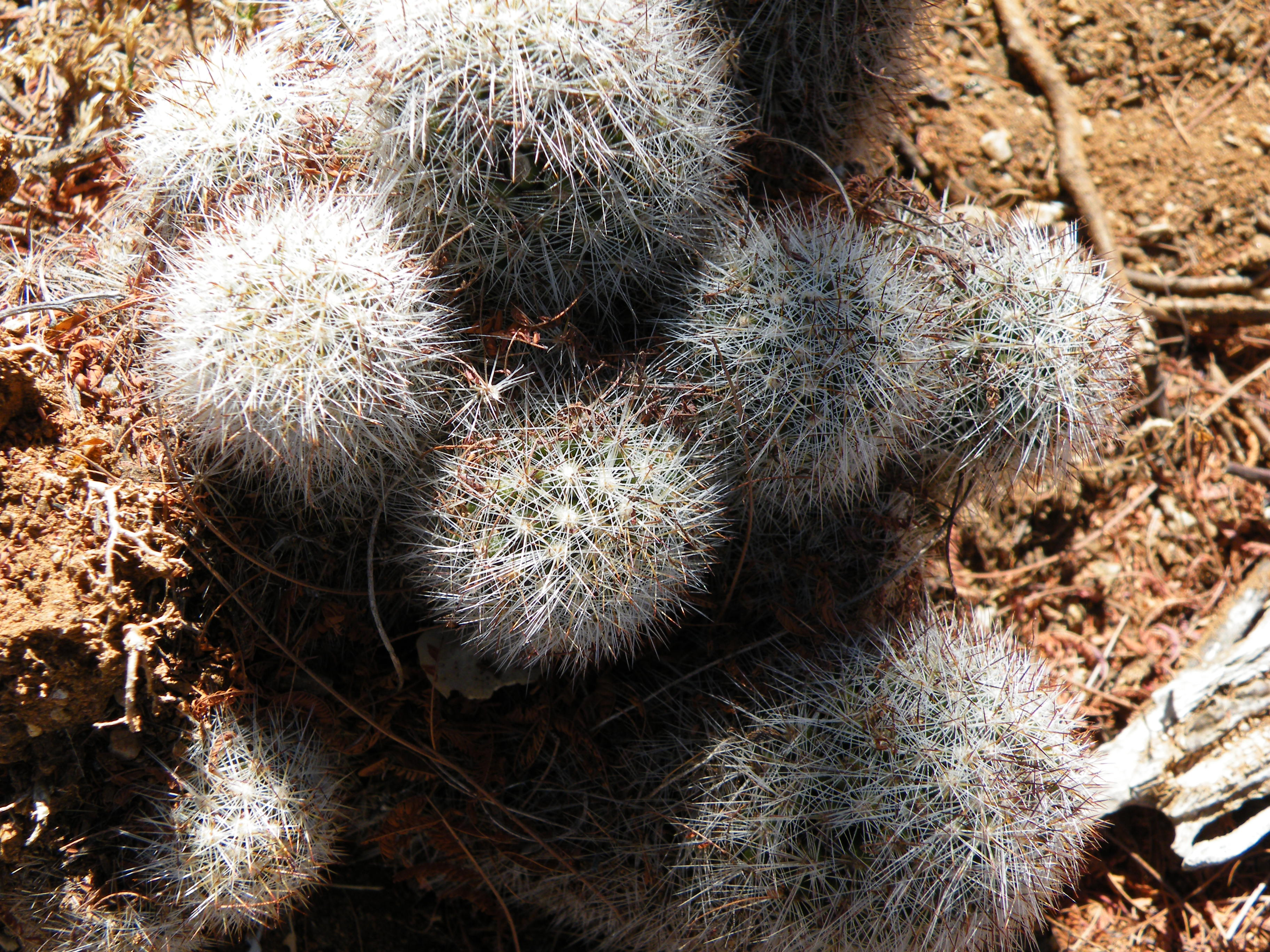

Conservation status
- Least Concern (IUCN 3.1)

Scientific classification
- Kingdom: Plantae
- Clade: Tracheophytes
- Clade: Angiosperms
- Clade: Eudicots
- Order: Caryophyllales
- Family: Cactaceae
- Subfamily: Cactoideae
- Genus: Cochemiea
- Species: C. phitauiana

Binomial name
- Cochemiea phitauiana (E.M.Baxter) Doweld

Synonyms
- List: Chilita phitauiana (E.M.Baxter) Buxb. 1954; Ebnerella phitauiana (E.M.Baxter) Buxb. 1951; Mammillaria dioica f. phitauiana (E.M.Baxter) Neutel. 1986; Mammillaria phitauiana (E.M.Baxter) Werderm. 1931; Neomammillaria phitauiana E.M.Baxter 1931; Chilita verhaertiana (Boed.) Orcutt 1926; Ebnerella verhaertiana (Boed.) Buxb. 1951; Mammillaria dioica f. verhaertiana (Boed.) Neutel. 1986; Mammillaria verhaertiana Boed. 1912; Neomammillaria verhaertiana (Boed.) Britton & Rose 1923

= Cochemiea phitauiana =

Species of cactus

Cochemiea phitauiana is a species of Cochemiea found in Mexico.

== Description ==
Cochemiea phitauiana sprouts from the base and forms small groups. Its cylindrical shoots are gray-green, growing up to 25 cm (9.8 in) high and 3 to 6 cm (1.2 to 2.4 in) in diameter. The roots are strand-like. The conical, four-sided warts are keeled and contain no milky juice. The axillae have about 20 bristles. The 4 central spines are straight, white with dark tips, and 4 to 6 mm (0.16 to 0.24 in) long. A hooked central spine is often seen in juveniles. The 24 radial spines are white, bristle-like, and 4 to 12 mm (0.16 to 0.47 in) long.

The white flowers are 1.2 to 1.5 cm (0.47 to 0.59 in) in diameter and length. The spherical or club-shaped fruits are red and up to 1 centimeter long, containing black seeds.

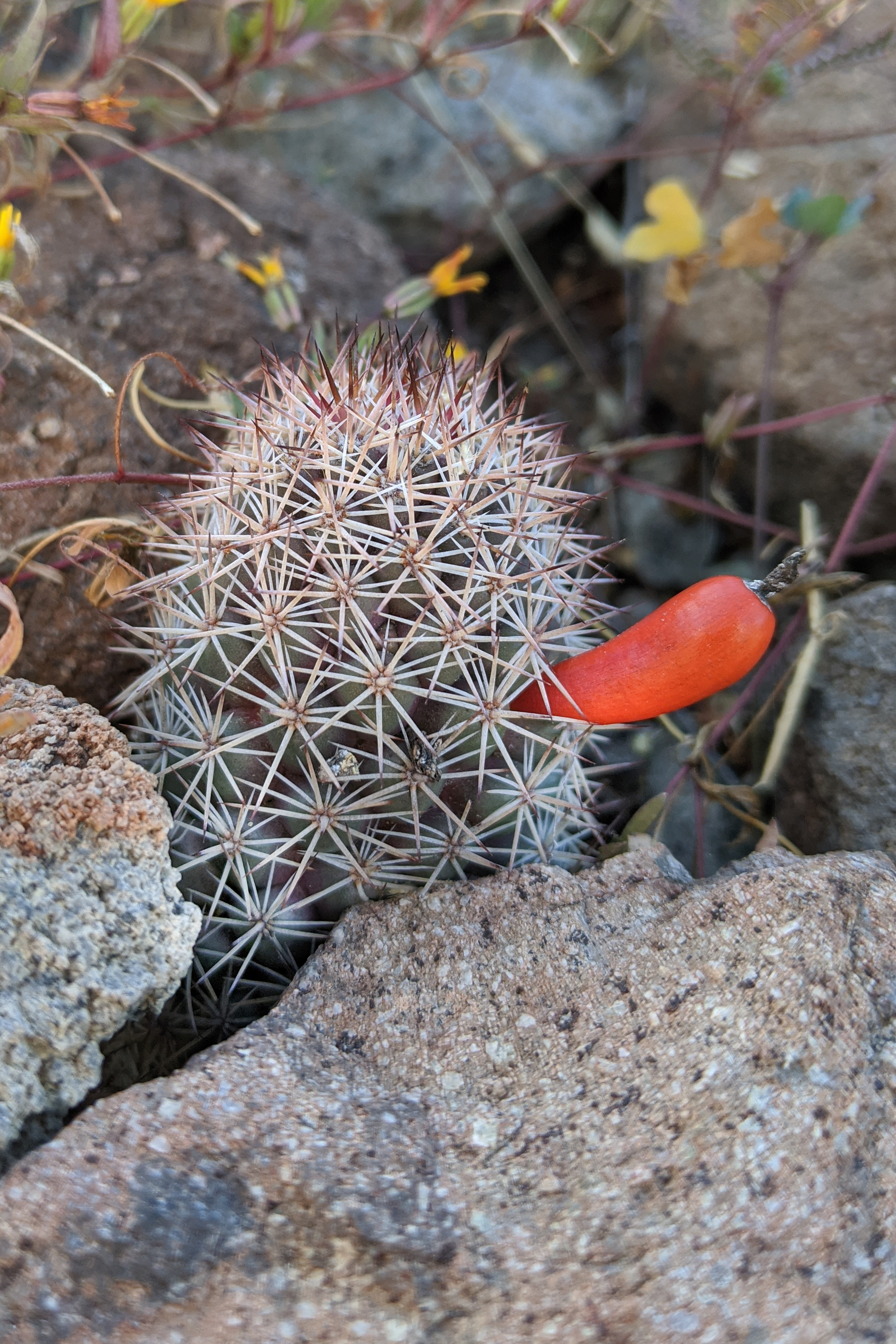
Plant with fruit

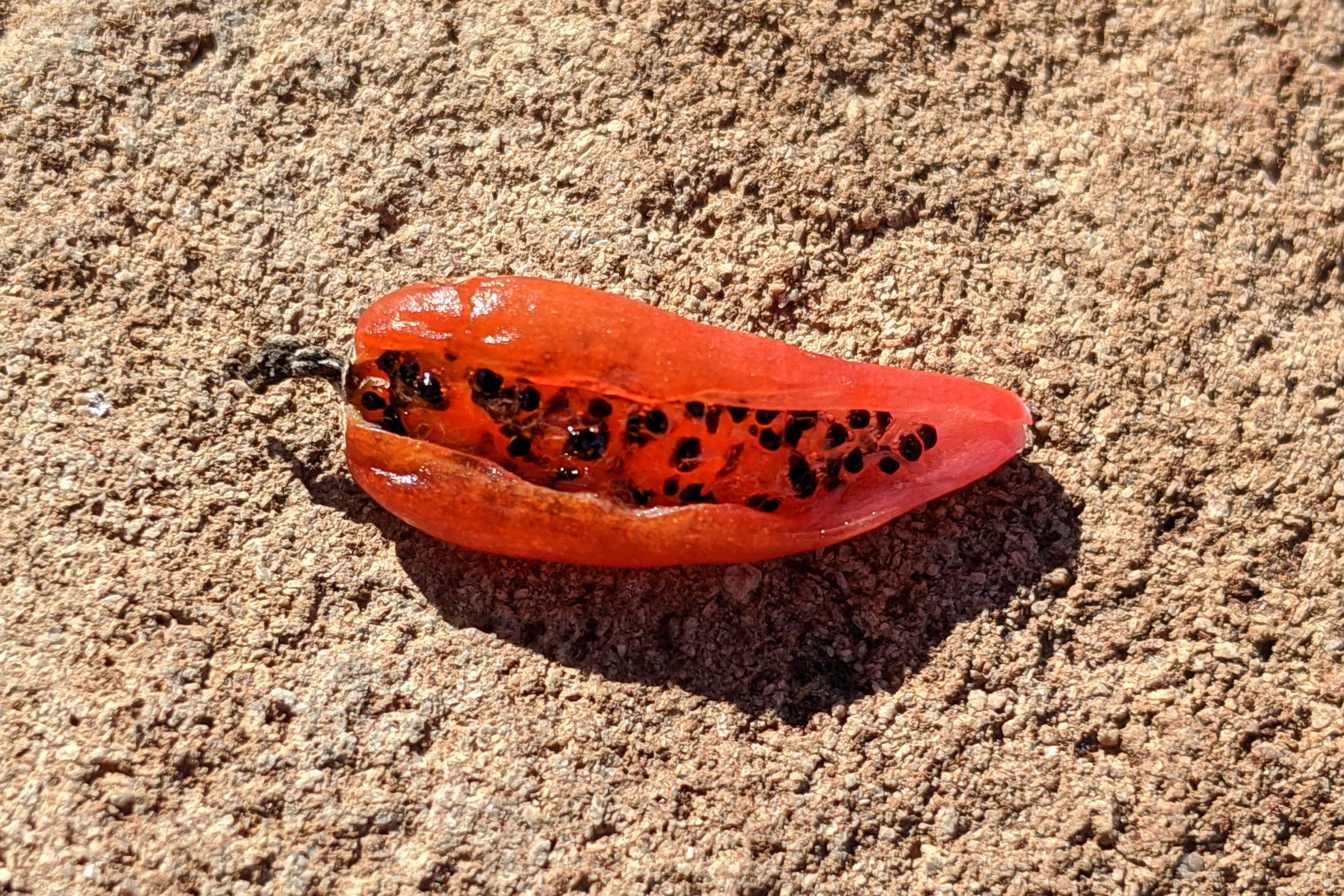
Fruit with seeds

== Distribution ==
Cochemiea phitauiana is found growing at the tip of Baja California Sur, Mexico growing in open plains with small shrubs at elevations between 90 and 900 meters. It is found growing with Mammillaria petrophila and Ferocactus townsendianus.

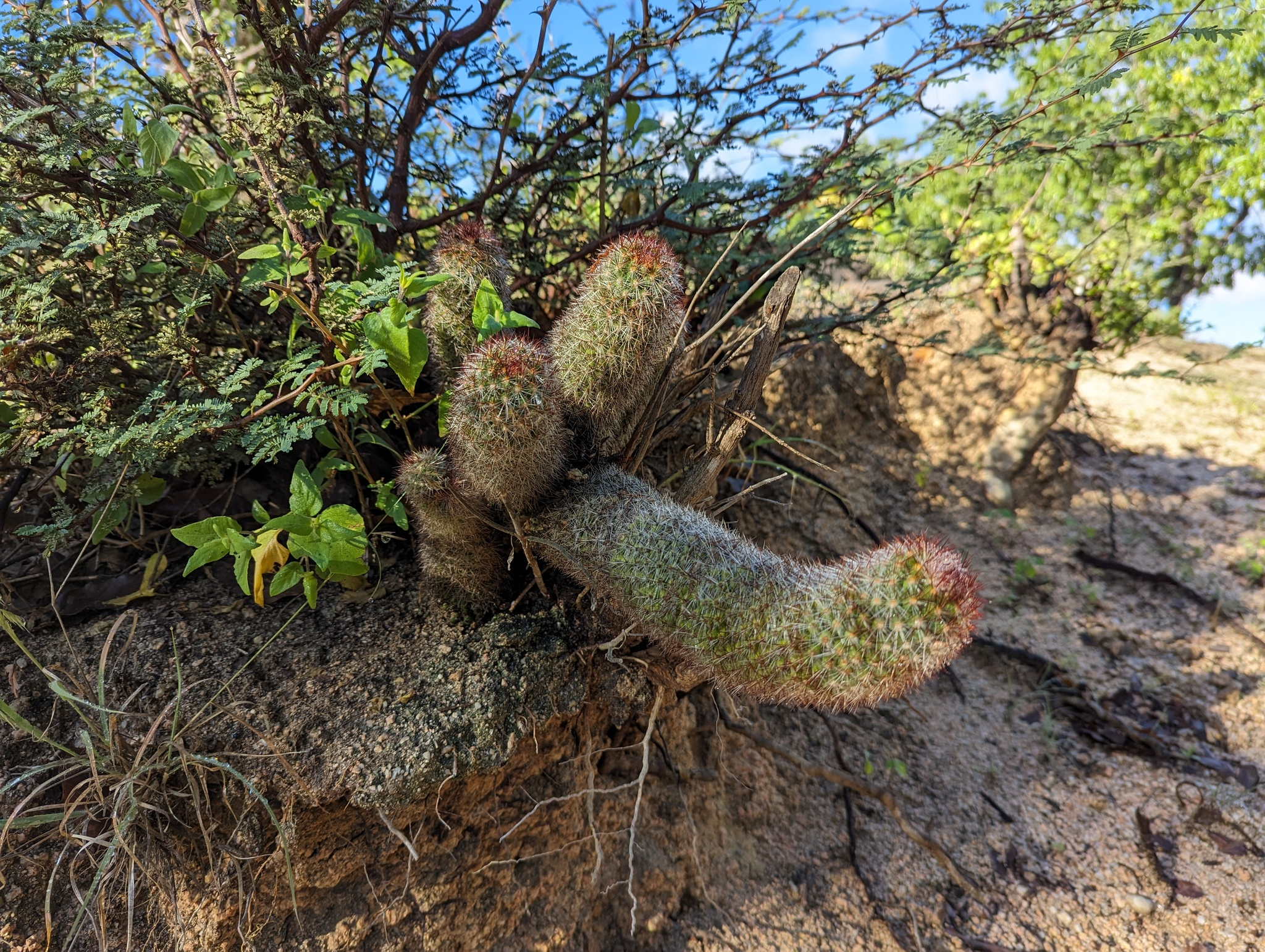
Habitat near Agua de San Antonio, Baja California Sur, Mexico

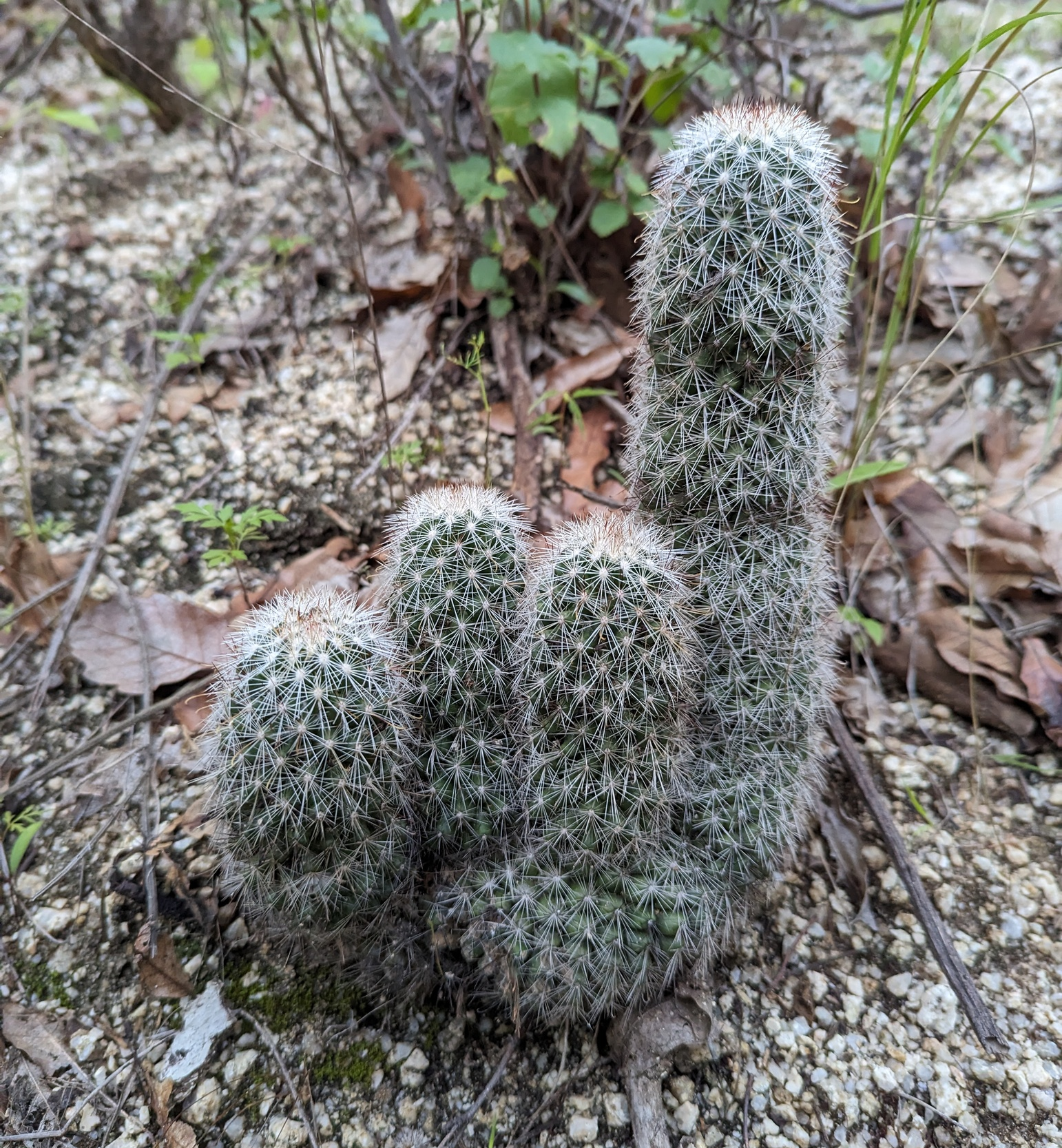
Plant growing in habitat near Agua de San Antonio

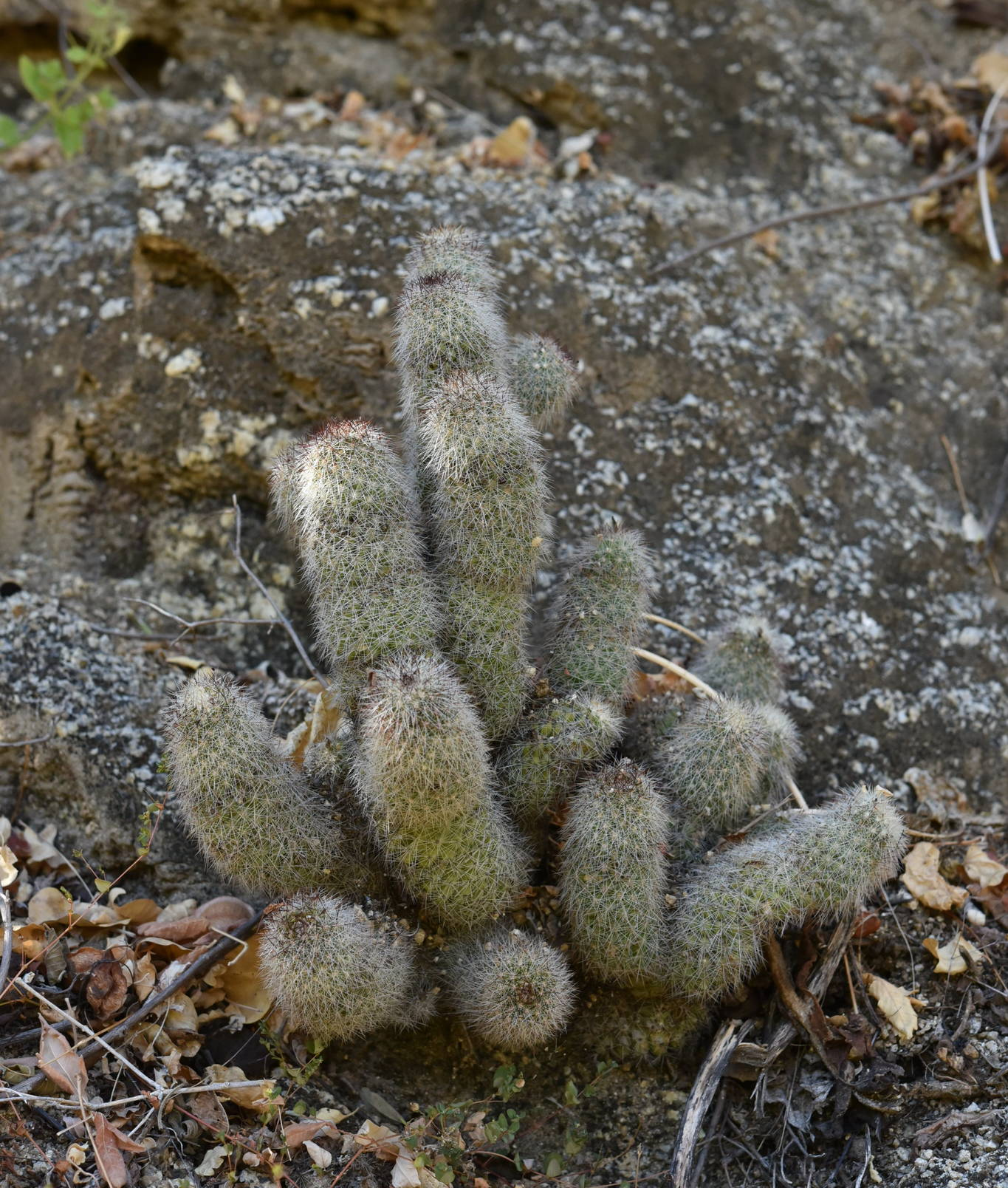
Plant growing in limestone habitat in San Dionisio, Baja California Sur, Mexico

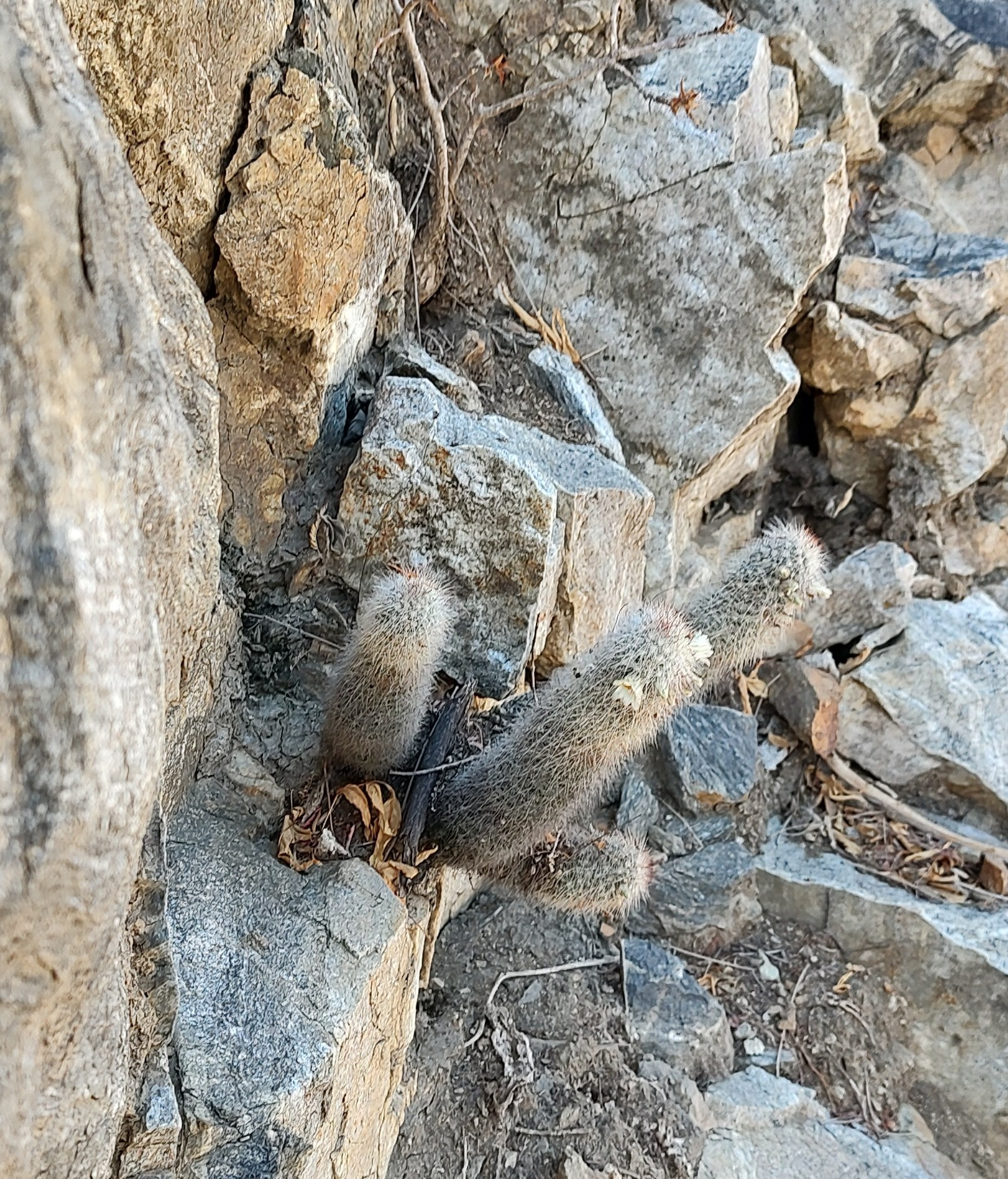
Habitat in San Antonio, Baja California Sur, Mexico

== Taxonomy ==
First described in 1931 by Edgar Martin Baxter as Neomammillaria phitauiana who found this species east of Todos Santos, Sierra de la Laguna, the specific epithet honors the Phi Kappa Tau fraternity, to which Baxter belonged. In 2000, Alexander Borissovitch Doweld reclassified the species into the genus Cochemiea.
