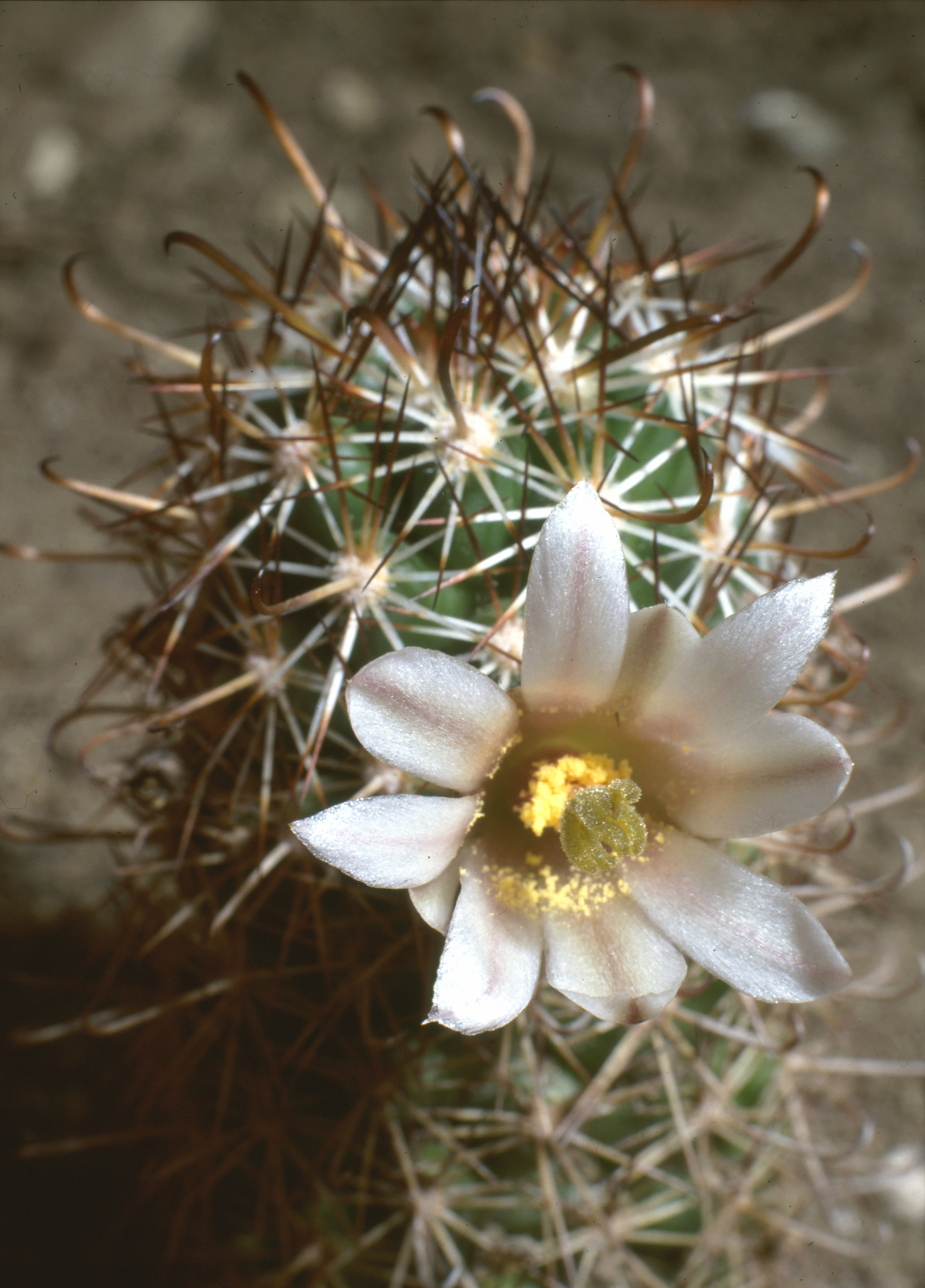

Conservation status
- Endangered (IUCN 3.1)

Scientific classification
- Kingdom: Plantae
- Clade: Tracheophytes
- Clade: Angiosperms
- Clade: Eudicots
- Order: Caryophyllales
- Family: Cactaceae
- Subfamily: Cactoideae
- Genus: Cochemiea
- Species: C. capensis

Binomial name
- Cochemiea capensis (H.E.Gates) Doweld

Synonyms
- List: Chilita capensis (H.E.Gates) Buxb. 1954; Ebnerella capensis (H.E.Gates) Buxb. 1951; Mammillaria capensis (H.E.Gates) R.T.Craig 1945; Mammillaria dioica var. capensis (H.E.Gates) Neutel. 1986; Neomammillaria capensis H.E.Gates 1933

= Cochemiea capensis =

Species of cactus

Cochemiea capensis is a species of Cochemiea found in Mexico.

== Description ==
Cochemiea capensis forms small clusters. The cylindrical, olive-green stems grow up to 25 cm (9.8 in) tall and 3 to 5 cm (1.2 to 2.0 in) in diameter. The plant lacks milky sap and has cylindrical warts. Its axillae have 1 to 3 short bristles.The needle-like spines are reddish-brown to black with a whitish base. It has one central spine, typically hooked and 1.5 to 2 cm (0.59 to 0.79 in) long, and 13 marginal spines, each 0.8 to 1.5 cm (0.31 to 0.59 in) long.

The funnel-shaped flowers are pink to white, growing up to 2 cm (0.79 in) long and 2 cm (0.79 in) in diameter. The red, club-shaped fruits contain black, pitted seeds.

== Distribution ==
Cochemiea capensis is found in Baja California Sur, Mexico.

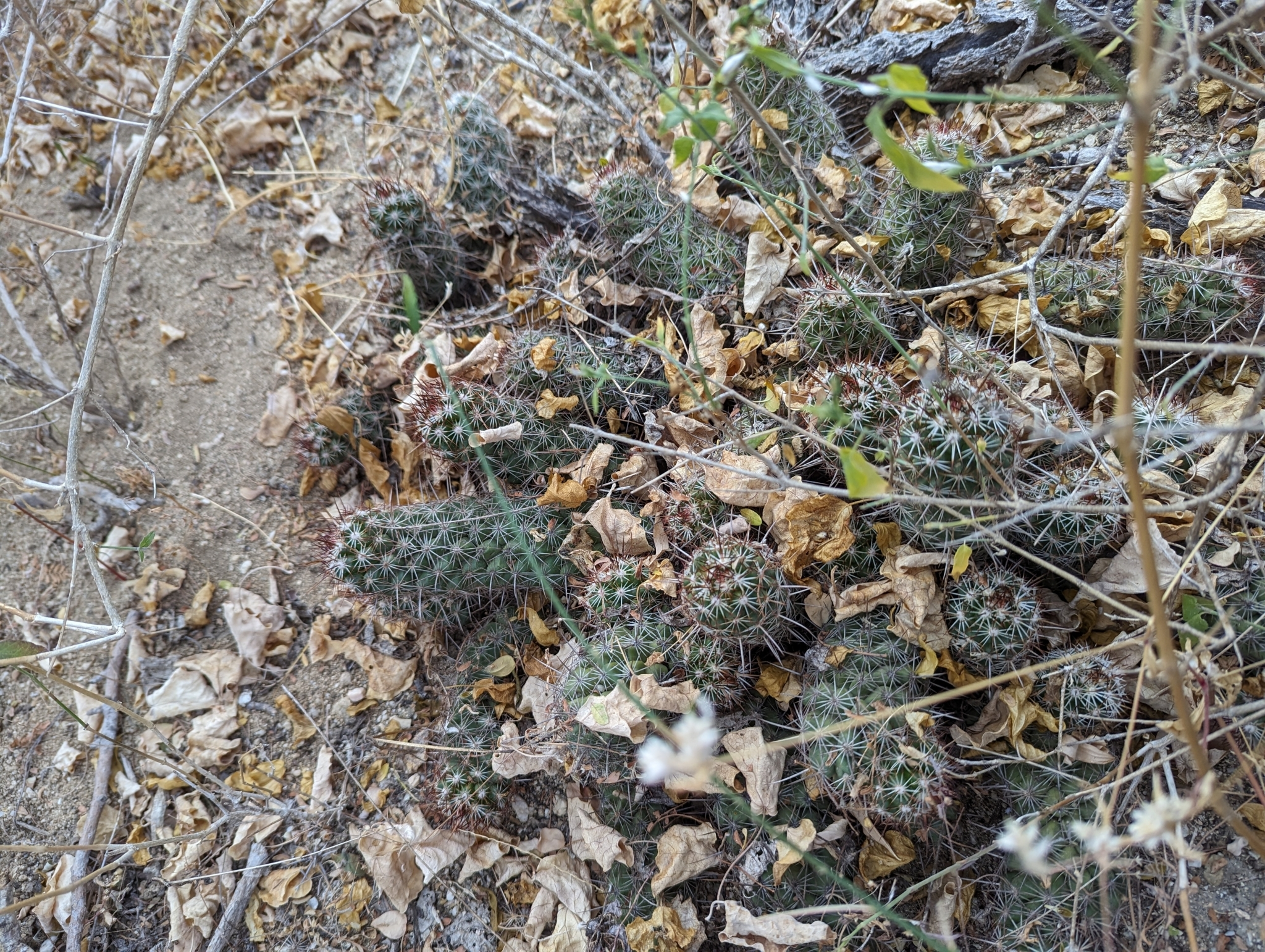
Plant growing in habitat near Santa Gertrudis, Baja California Sur

== Taxonomy ==
It was first described as Neomammillaria capensis in 1933 by Howard Elliott Gates, with the specific epithet "capensis" referring to its occurrence near Cabo San Lucas. Alexander Borissovitch Doweld reclassified it into the genus Cochemiea in 2000.
