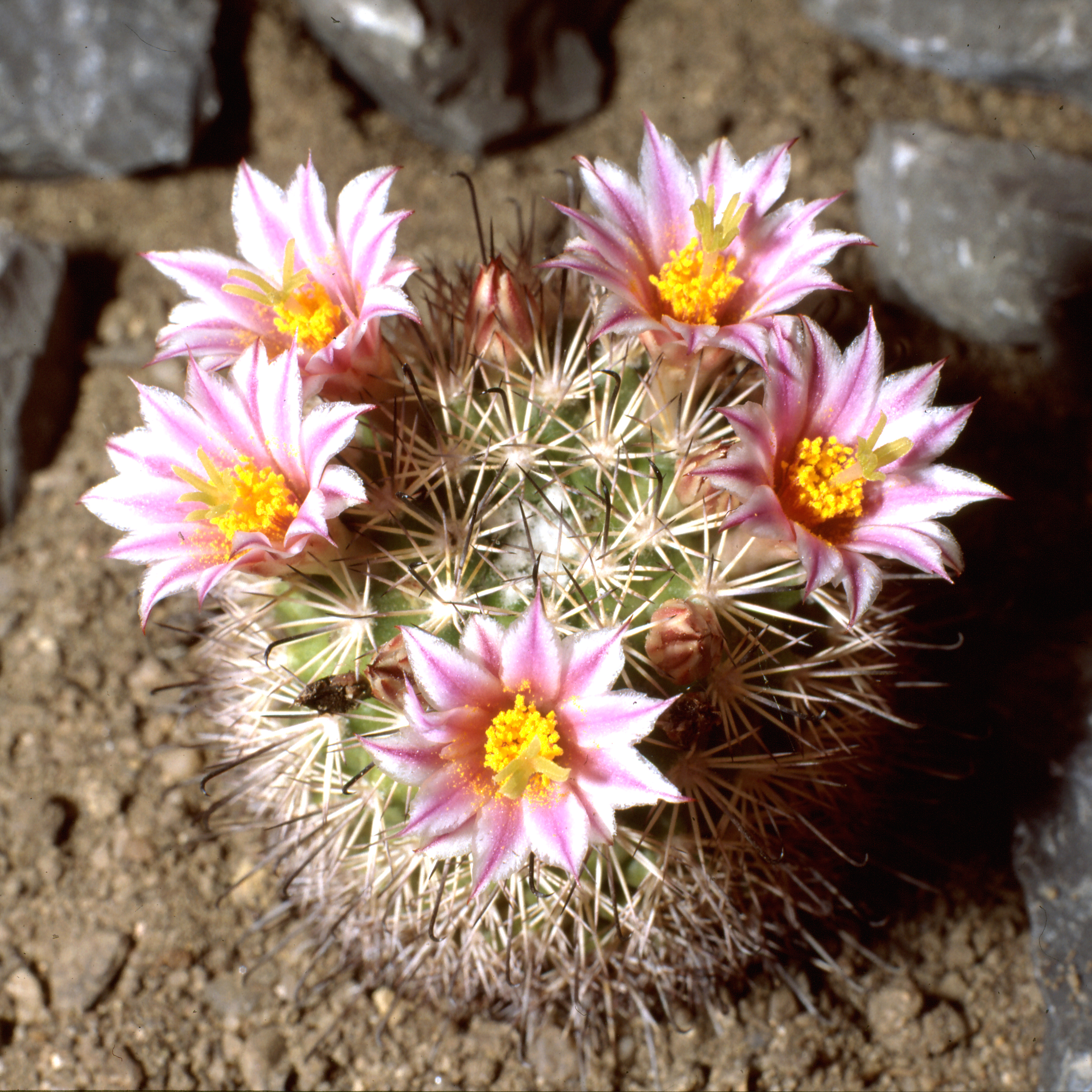

Conservation status
- Near Threatened (IUCN 3.1)

Scientific classification
- Kingdom: Plantae
- Clade: Tracheophytes
- Clade: Angiosperms
- Clade: Eudicots
- Order: Caryophyllales
- Family: Cactaceae
- Subfamily: Cactoideae
- Genus: Cochemiea
- Species: C. blossfeldiana

Binomial name
- Cochemiea blossfeldiana (Boed.) P.B.Breslin & Majure 2021

Synonyms
- Bartschella blossfeldiana (Boed.) Doweld 2001; Chilita blossfeldiana (Boed.) Buxb. 1954; Ebnerella blossfeldiana (Boed.) Buxb. 1951; Mammillaria blossfeldiana Boed. 1931; Mammillaria goodridgei var. blossfeldiana (Boed.) Neutel. 1986; Neomammillaria blossfeldiana (Boed.) H.E.Gates 1933

= Cochemiea blossfeldiana =

Species of cactus

Cochemiea blossfeldiana is a species of Cochemiea found in Mexico.

== Description ==
Cochemiea blossfeldiana typically grows alone, though sometimes in clusters. It has spherical to briefly cylindrical gray-green bodies, reaching 5 cm (2.0 in) in height and 3 to 4 cm (1.2 to 1.6 in) in diameter. Its conical warts lack milky sap, and its axillae are thinly woolly. The plant bears 4 dark brown to black central spines, 1 to 1.2 cm (0.39 to 0.47 in) long, with the lowest one hooking outward and the upper ones straight. Additionally, it features 15 to 20 marginal spines, yellow with dark tips, measuring 0.5 to 0.7 cm (0.20 to 0.28 in) long.

Its funnel-shaped flowers, white with pink to crimson stripes, are 2 cm (0.79 in) long and 2 to 4 cm (0.79 to 1.57 in) in diameter. The club-shaped fruits are orange-red, containing black pitted seeds.

== Distribution ==
These plants grow in decomposing granite and gravelly soil in Baja California and Guadalupe and Cedros Islands, Mexico, at elevations of 0 to 150 meters. They thrive in arid plains near the coast in the Lower Sonora Desert zone, specifically at Santa Rosalillita, and on steep coastal slopes at Punta Baja, Boca Marrón, and Punta María. Further south, they can be found near Mezquital.

== Subspecies ==
There are two recognized subspecies:

Image	Subspecies	Distribution
	Cochemiea blossfeldiana subsp. blossfeldiana	Guadalupe and Baja California
	Cochemiea blossfeldiana subsp. rectispina (E.Y.Dawson) P.B.Breslin & Majure	Northern Baja California

== Taxonomy ==
Friedrich Bödeker first described the plant in 1931, placing it in the genus Mammillaria and naming it in honor of German gardener Robert Blossfeld. Peter B. Breslin and Lucas C. Majure transferred the species to Cochemiea in 2021.
