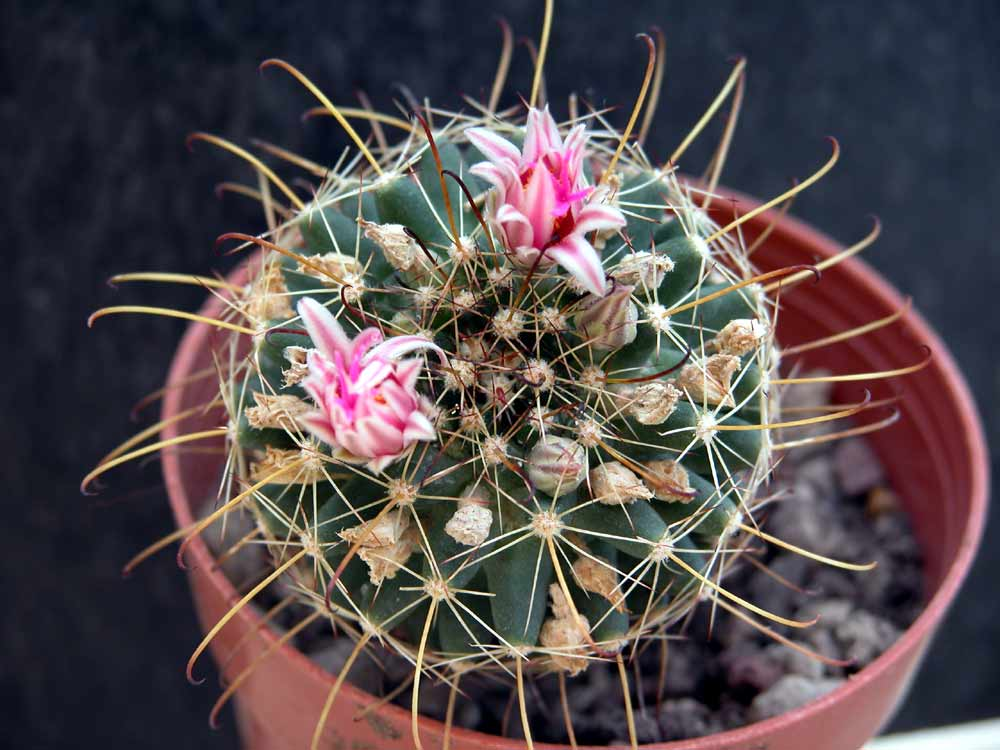

Conservation status
- Least Concern (IUCN 3.1)

Scientific classification
- Kingdom: Plantae
- Clade: Tracheophytes
- Clade: Angiosperms
- Clade: Eudicots
- Order: Caryophyllales
- Family: Cactaceae
- Subfamily: Cactoideae
- Genus: Cochemiea
- Species: C. mainiae

Binomial name
- Cochemiea mainiae (K.Brandegee) P.B.Breslin & Majure

Synonyms
- Chilita mainiae (K.Brandegee) Orcutt 1926; Ebnerella mainiae (K.Brandegee) Buxb. 1951; Mammillaria mainiae K.Brandegee 1900; Neomammillaria mainiae (K.Brandegee) Britton & Rose 1923

= Cochemiea mainiae =

Species of cactus

Cochemiea mainiae is a species of cactus in the subfamily Cactoideae, with the common name counterclockwise nipple cactus.

== Description ==
Cochemiea mainiae grows both solitary and in clusters from the base. Its bright green, sometimes reddish, spherical to egg-shaped shoots reach 6-7 centimeters in height and 10-12 centimeters in diameter. The slightly inward-curving, cylindrical to conical warts lack milky juice and have bare axillae. The plant has 1-2 strong central spines, brown or yellow with dark tips, up to 1.5 centimeters long, and 8-15 slender, needle-like radial spines, yellow to white with dark tips, 1.2 centimeters long.

The pinkish-white flowers feature a striking purplish-pink central stripe, are 1.2 centimeters long, and equally wide. The bright red, small, spherical to ovoid fruits, containing black seeds.

== Distribution ==
Cochemiea mainiae is native to the Sonoran desert plains of Arizona in the US and the Mexican states of Sonora and Sinaloa growing in sand dunes, rocky slopes and hillsides and southwestern oak woodlands.

== Taxonomy ==
Initially described as Mammillaria mainiae in 1900 by Mary Katharine Brandegee, the species name honors its discoverer, Ms. F. M. Main. In 2021, Peter B. Breslin and Lucas C. Majure reclassified the species into the genus Cochemiea.
