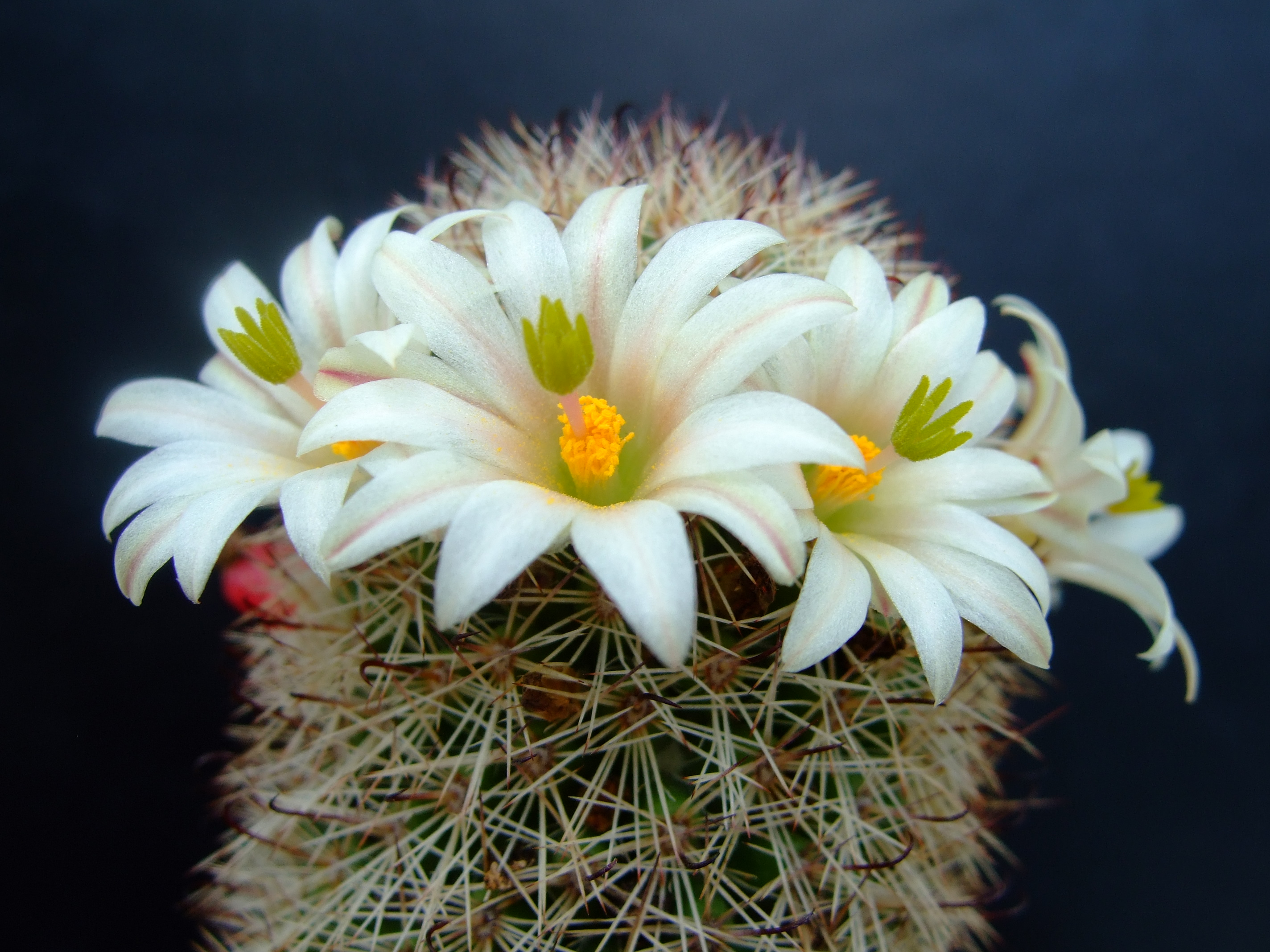

Conservation status
- Least Concern (IUCN 3.1)

Scientific classification
- Kingdom: Plantae
- Clade: Tracheophytes
- Clade: Angiosperms
- Clade: Eudicots
- Order: Caryophyllales
- Family: Cactaceae
- Subfamily: Cactoideae
- Genus: Cochemiea
- Species: C. hutchisoniana

Binomial name
- Cochemiea hutchisoniana (H.E.Gates) P.B.Breslin & Majure 2021
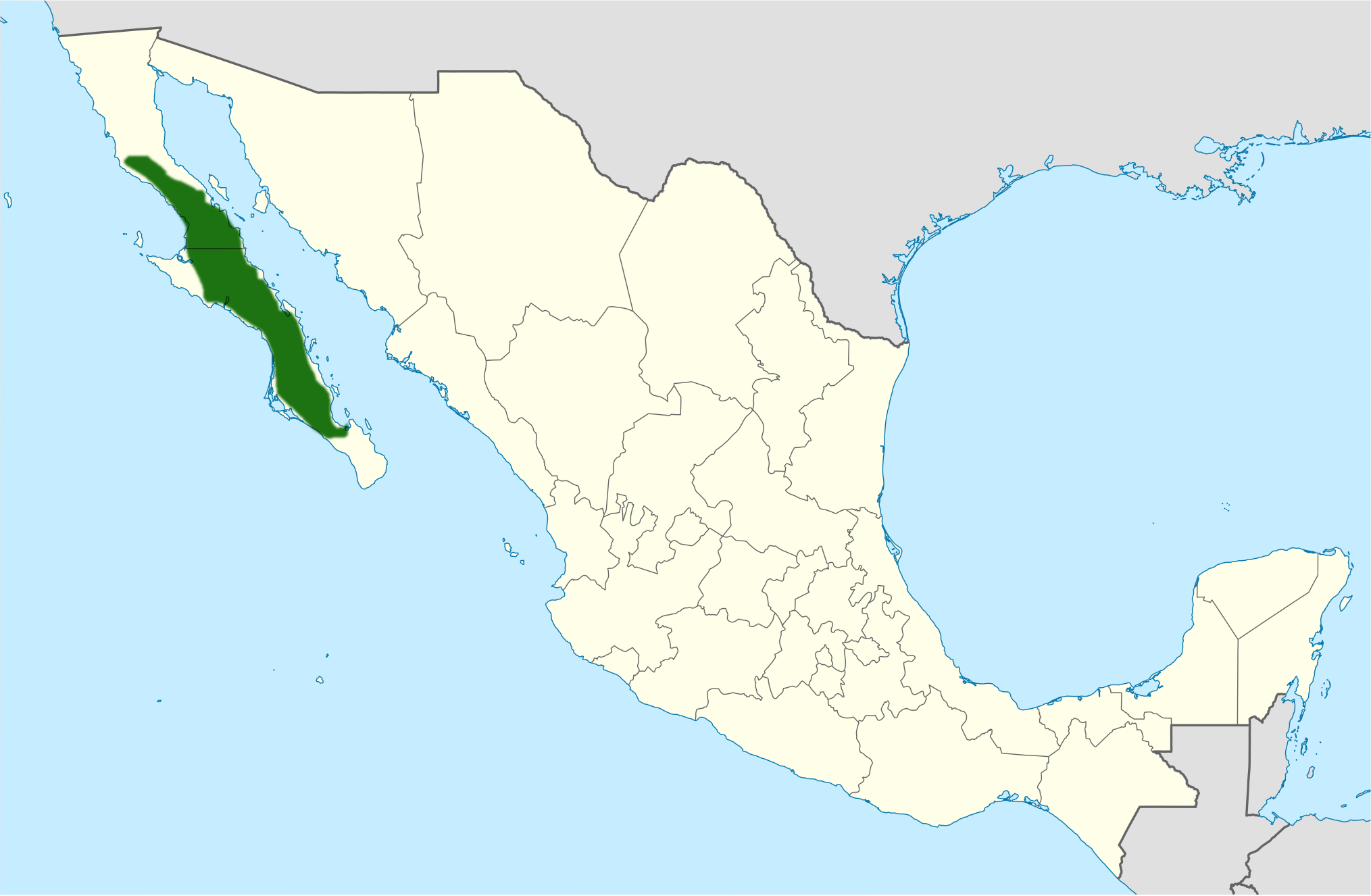

Synonyms
- Bartschella hutchisoniana (H.E.Gates) Doweld 2000; Chilita hutchisoniana (H.E.Gates) Buxb. 1954; Ebnerella hutchisoniana (H.E.Gates) Buxb. 1951; Mammillaria goodridgei var. hutchisoniana (H.E.Gates) Neutel. 1986; Mammillaria hutchisoniana (H.E.Gates) Boed. 1936; Neomammillaria hutchisoniana H.E.Gates 1934

= Cochemiea hutchisoniana =

Species of cactus

Cochemiea hutchisoniana is a species of Cochemiea found in Mexico.

== Description ==
The plants grow singly or in clusters, with cylindrical shoots that are olive green, reaching heights up to 15 cm and diameters of 4-6 cm. They have short, conical warts that are also olive green and lack milky sap, with bare or slightly woolly axillae. The four brownish central spines, 7-10 mm long, have purple tips, with the lowest middle spine being hooked. There are 10-20 erect, slender, needle-like marginal spines, initially purple to black, later turning white, ranging from 5-8 mm in length.

The flowers, slightly pink to cream or white, feature a dark central stripe and reach diameters of 25-30 mm. The club-shaped scarlet fruits are 20 mm long, containing black, dotted seeds less than 1 mm in diameter.

== Subspecies ==
There are two recognized subspecies:

Image	Subspecies	Distribution
	Cochemiea hutchisoniana subsp. hutchisoniana	Baja California
	Cochemiea hutchisoniana subsp. louisae (G.E.Linds.) Majure	Baja California

== Distribution ==
Cochemiea hutchisoniana is commonly found in the Baja California peninsula of Mexico.

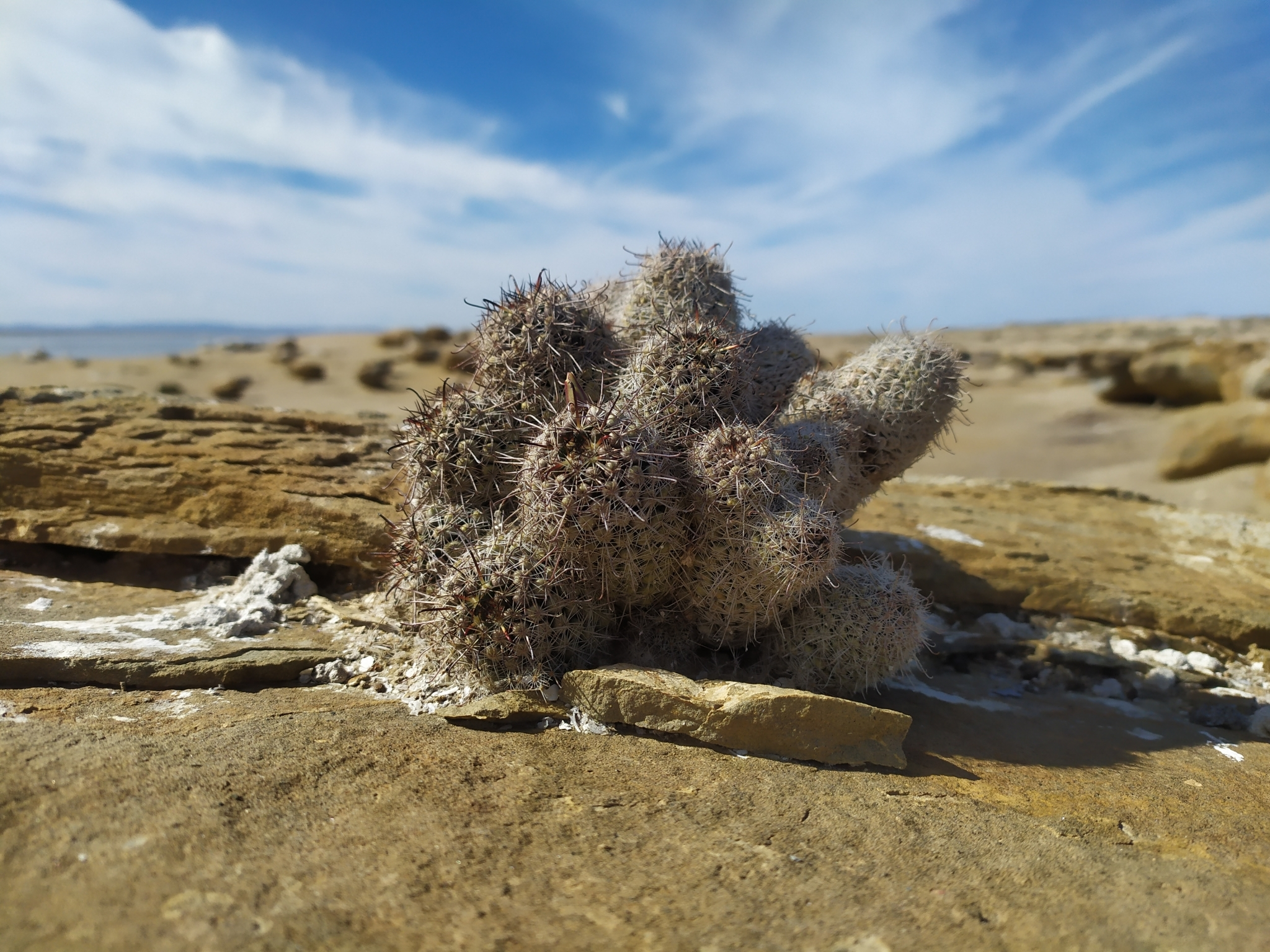
Plants growing in Ojo de Liebre, Baja California Sur, Mexico

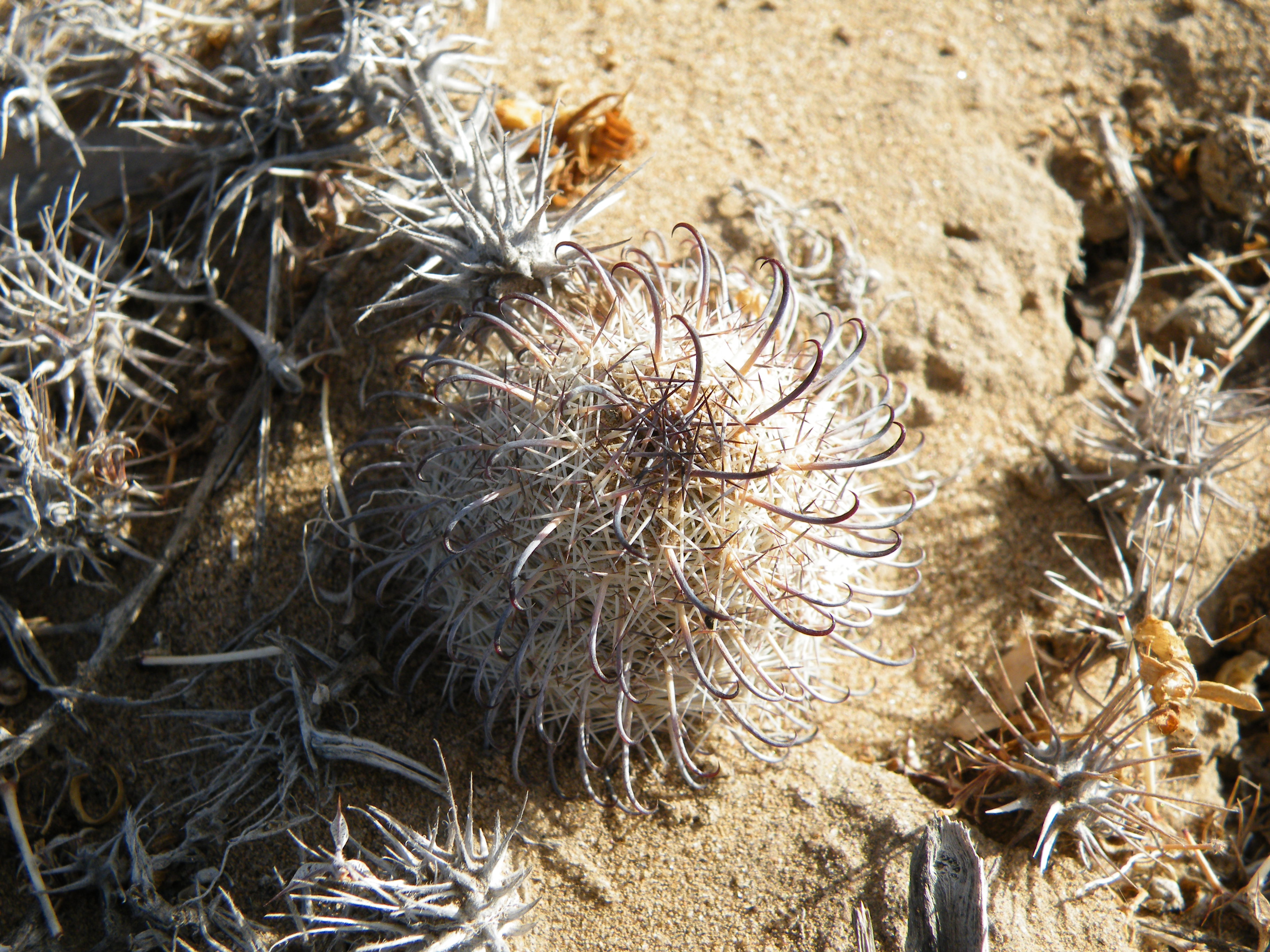
Plants growing in Viscaino, Baja California Sur

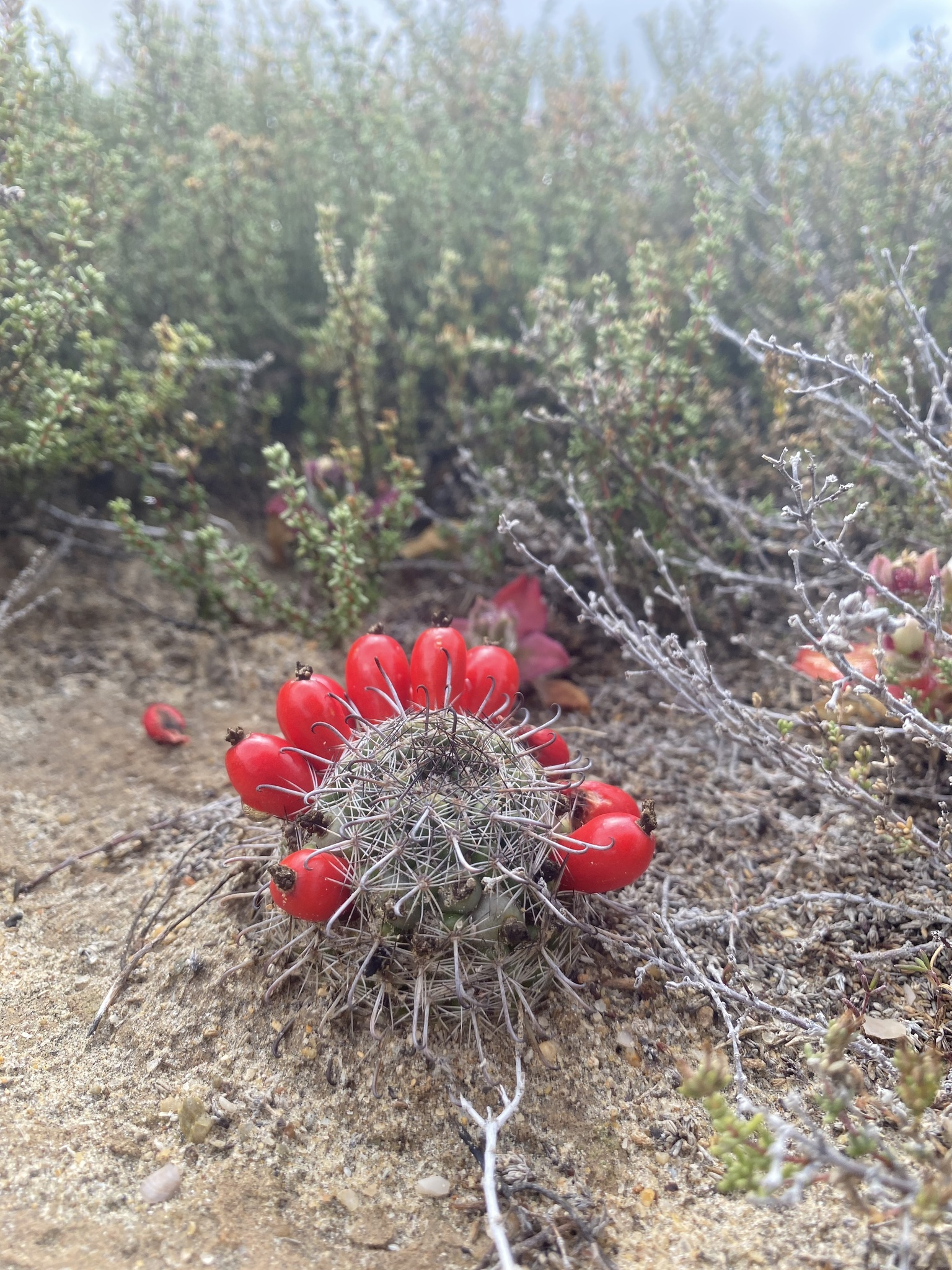
Cochemiea hutchisoniana subsp. louisae fruiting in Guerrero Negro, Baja California Sur, Mexico

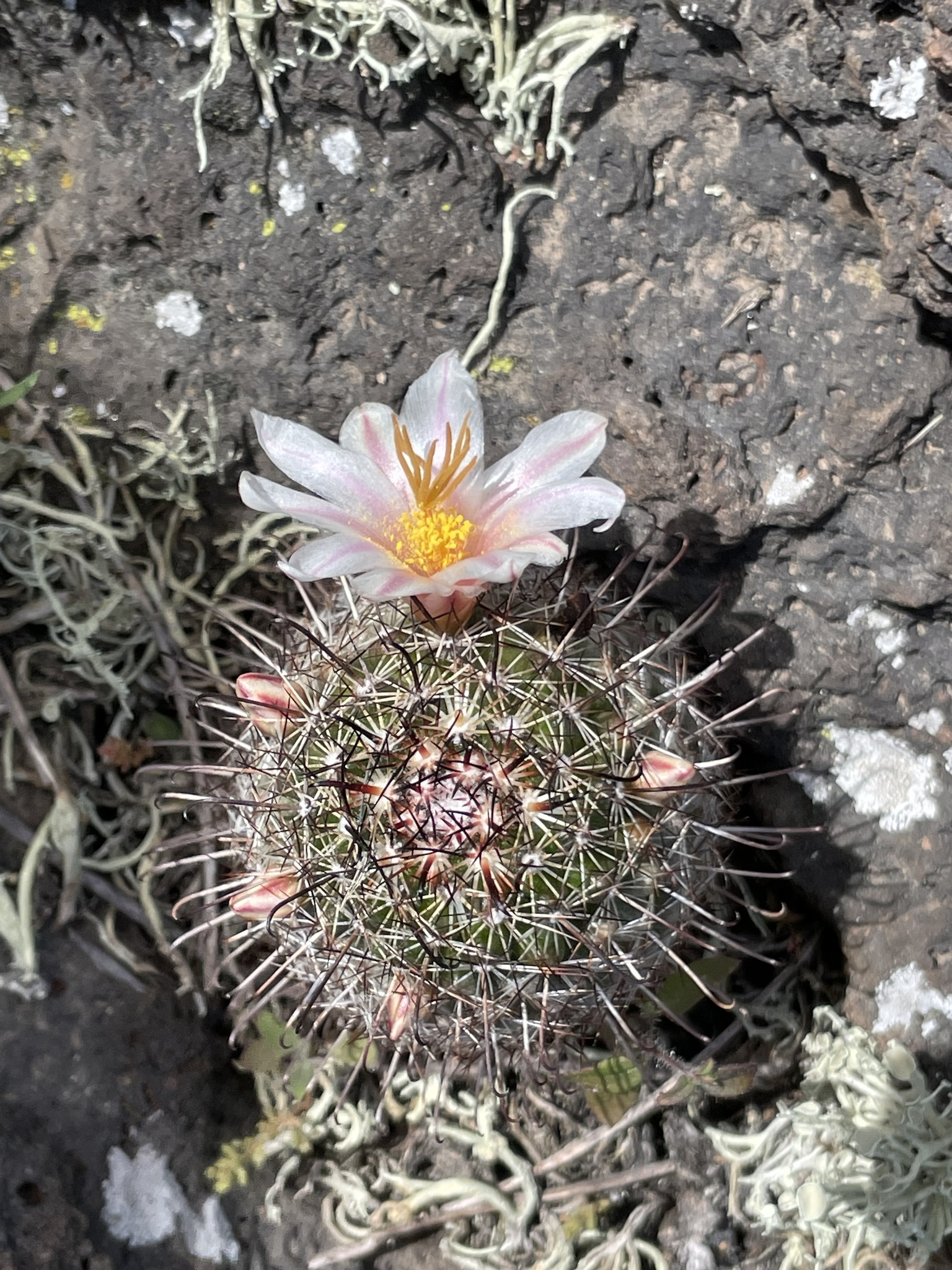
Plant blooming in Campo La Chorera, Baja California, Mexico

== Taxonomy ==
Originally described as Neomammillaria hutchisoniana in 1934 by Howard Elliott Gates, it was reclassified into the genus Cochemiea by Peter B. Breslin and Lucas C. Majure in 2021.
