= Cochemiea bullardiana =

Scientific classification
- Kingdom: Plantae
- Clade: Tracheophytes
- Clade: Angiosperms
- Clade: Eudicots
- Order: Caryophyllales
- Family: Cactaceae
- Subfamily: Cactoideae
- Genus: Cochemiea
- Species: C. bullardiana

Binomial name
- Cochemiea bullardiana (H.E.Gates) P.B.Breslin & Majure

Synonyms
- Ebnerella bullardiana (H.E.Gates) Buxb. 1951; Mammillaria bullardiana (H.E.Gates) Boed. 1936; Mammillaria goodridgei var. bullardiana (H.E.Gates) Neutel. 1986; Mammillaria hutchisoniana var. bullardiana (H.E.Gates) Repp. 1991; Neomammillaria bullardiana H.E.Gates 1934

Species of cactus

Cochemiea bullardiana is a species of Cochemiea found in Mexico.

== Description ==
This cactus typically grows as a solitary plant, though it can sometimes form clusters. Its stems are cylindrical, olive green, and can reach up to 15 cm in height and 4 to 6 cm in diameter. The stems are covered in spirally arranged, conical tubercles that do not produce milky sap. Each tubercle has an areole bearing dark-tipped, hooked central spines and 10 to 20 straight, whitish radial spines. The plant produces pinkish-white flowers about 3 cm across. Its fruits are red and club-shaped, containing black seeds.

== Distribution ==
This species is found in Baja California, Mexico growing in native desert and dry scrubland environments.

== Taxonomy ==
The species was first described as Neomammillaria bullardiana in 1934 by Howard Elliott Gates in the Cactus and Succulent Journal. The name "bullardiana" honors a naturalist named Bullard. In 2021, botanists Peter B. Breslin and Lucas C. Majure moved the species to the genus Cochemiea, resulting in its current name, Cochemiea bullardiana.
