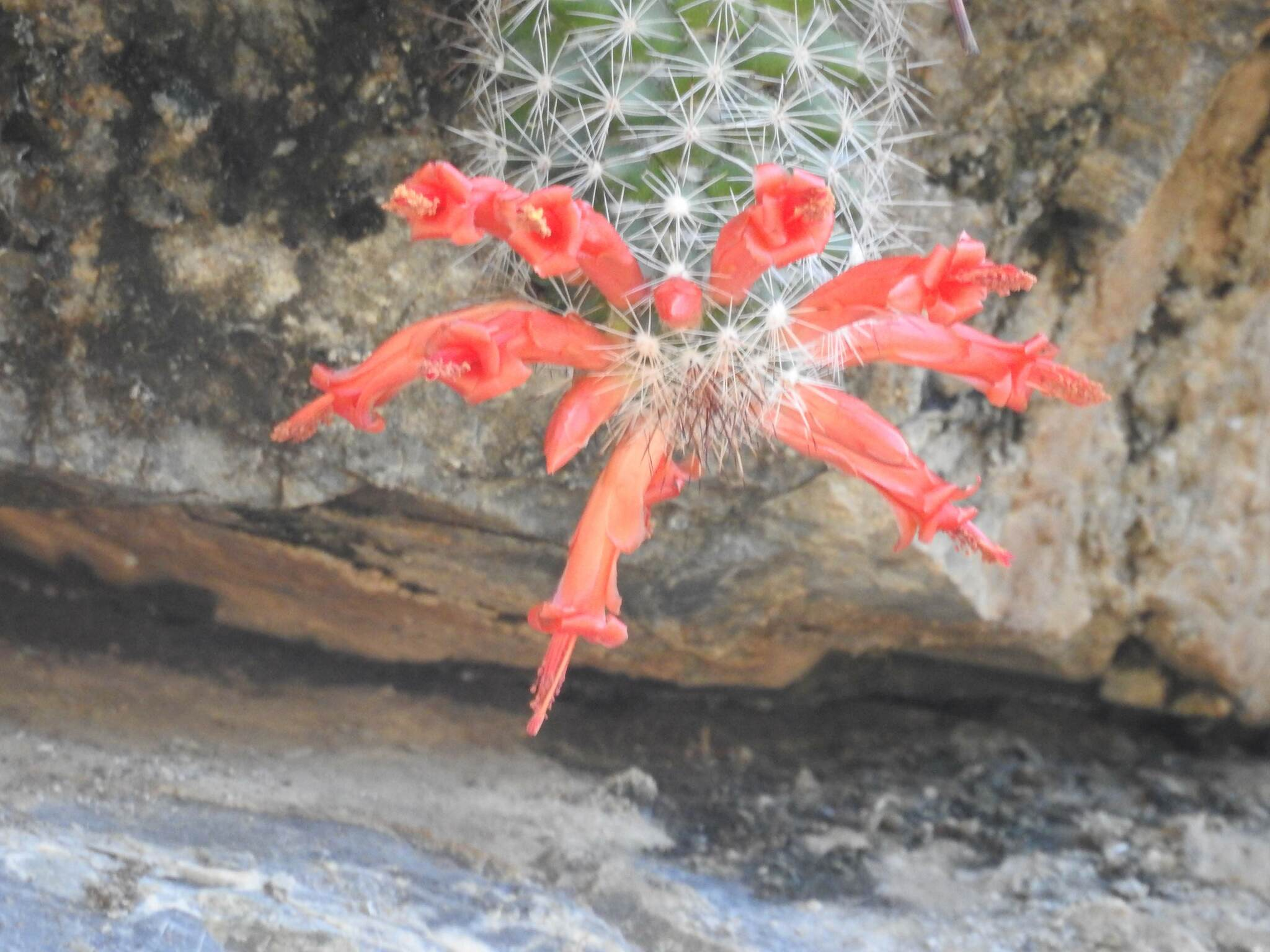

Scientific classification
- Kingdom: Plantae
- Clade: Tracheophytes
- Clade: Angiosperms
- Clade: Eudicots
- Order: Caryophyllales
- Family: Cactaceae
- Subfamily: Cactoideae
- Genus: Cochemiea
- Species: C. thomasii

Binomial name
- Cochemiea thomasii García-Mor., Rodr.González, J.García-Jim. & Iamonico

Synonyms
- Mammillaria thomasii (García-Mor., Rodr.González, J.García-Jim. & Iamonico) M.H.J.van der Meer 2021

= Cochemiea thomasii =

Species of cactus

Cochemiea thomasii is a species of Cochemiea found in Mexico.

== Description ==
Cochemiea thomasii forms large, slender clusters of hanging stems that are 60 cm (24 in) or longer. The cylindrical shoots are 1.1–1.3 cm (0.43–0.51 in) long and 0.9–1.0 cm (0.35–0.39 in) in diameter, with conical warts covered in white wool. It has 1–4 stiff, white with reddish-brown tipped central spines, 0.7–1.3 cm (0.28–0.51 in) long, which turn gray with age, and 10–15 radial spines that are initially white, turning brown to black, and are also 0.7–1.3 cm (0.28–0.51 in) long.

The red flowers bloom from young tubercles, measuring 3–4.2 cm (1.2–1.7 in) long, with a vertical, crooked-hemmed, and long flower tube. The fruits are ovoid, green to reddish-brown, and up to 0.7–0.9 cm (0.28–0.35 in) long.

== Distribution ==
Plants are found growing near Cosalá, Sinaloa, in deciduous tropical forest growing on vertical rock cliffs from the coast towards the Sierra Madre Occidental at elevations between 300 and 325 m (984 and 1,066 ft).

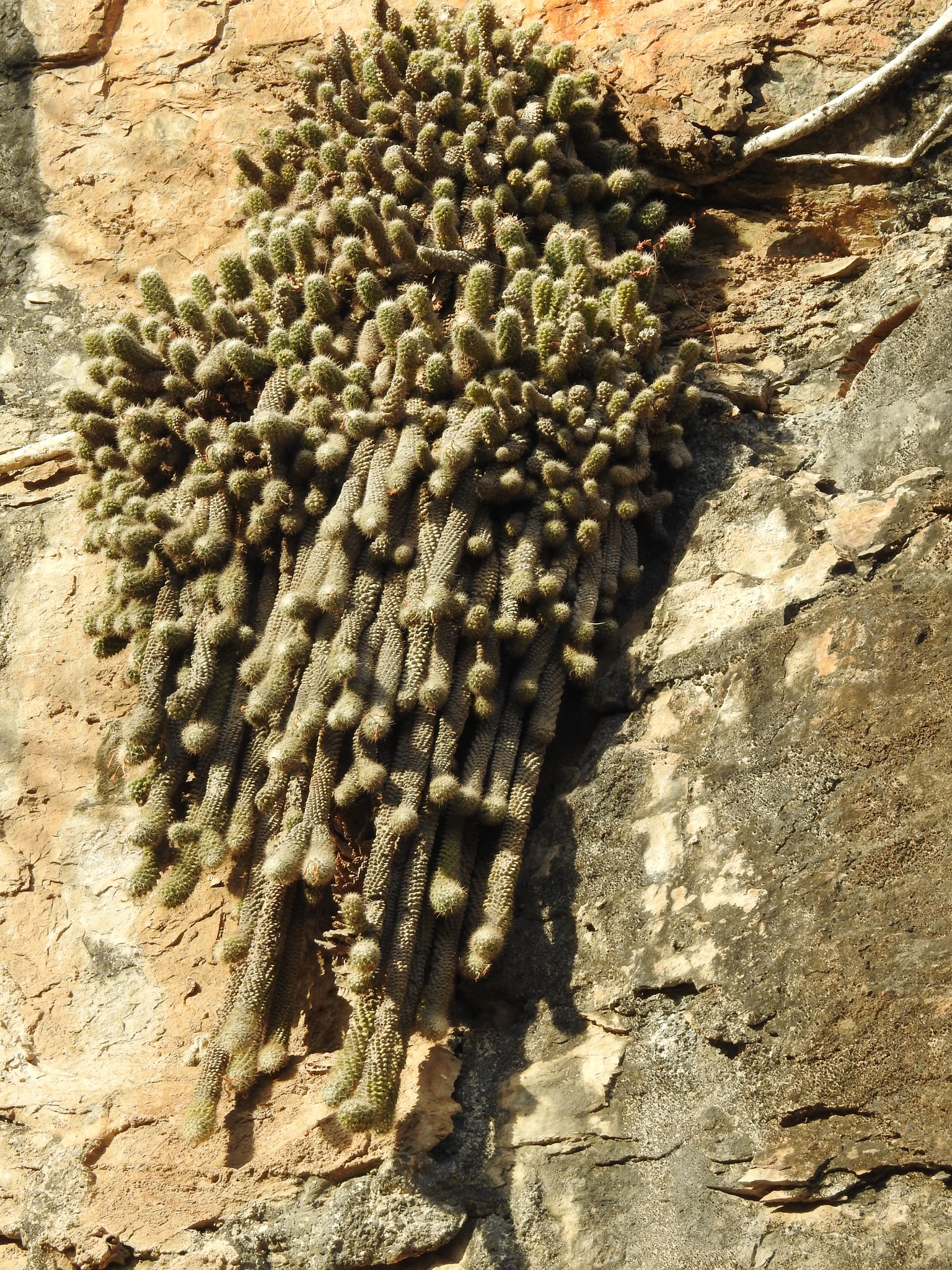
Plant growing in habitat in Presa El Comedero, Sinaloa, Mexico

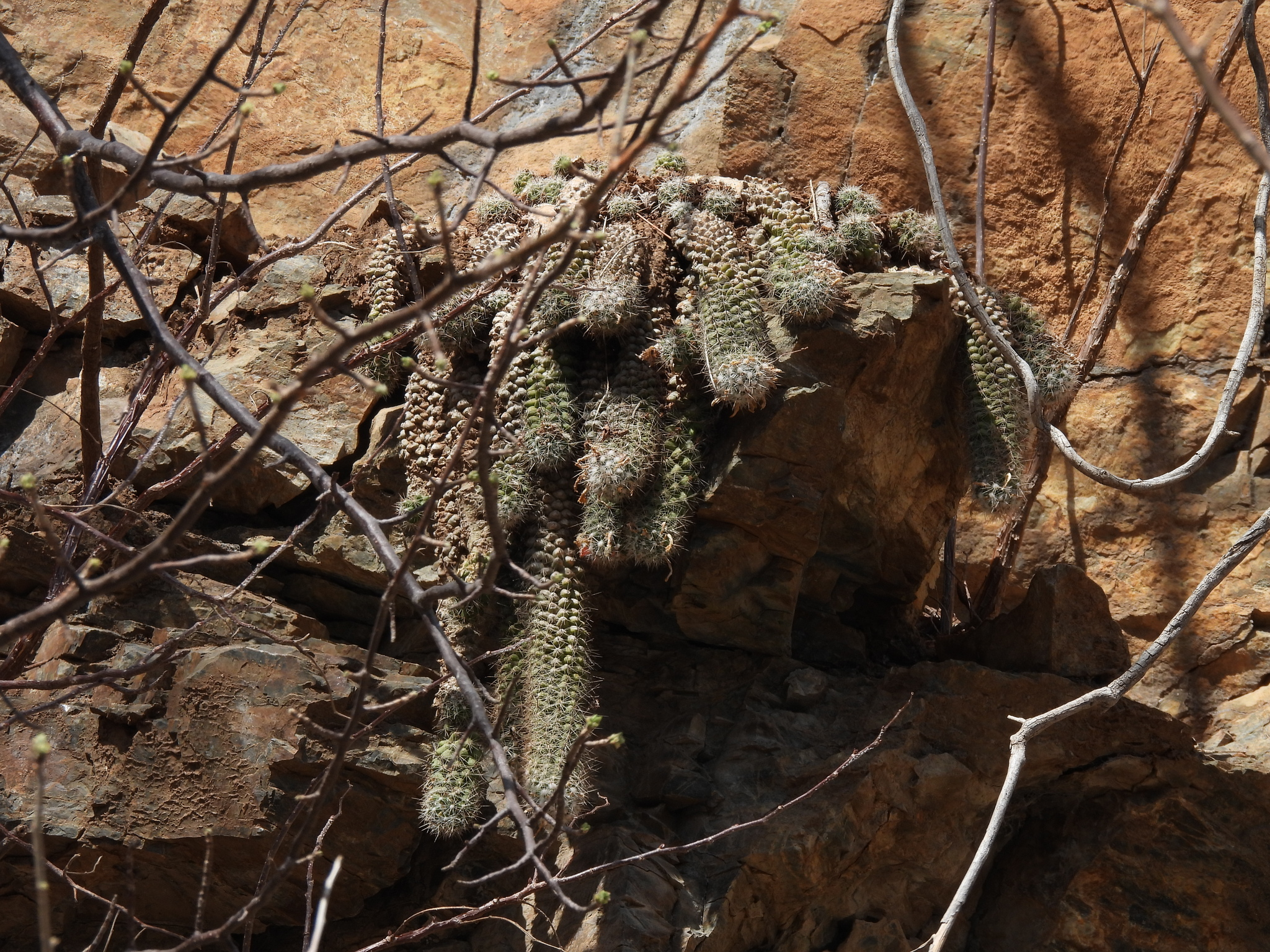
Plant growing in habitat in Cosalá, Sinaloa, Mexico

== Taxonomy ==
This species was described in 2020 by Leccinum J. García Morales, Rodrigo González González, Jesús García Jiménez, and Duilio Iamonico, and named after Thomas Linzen, a German scholar of the genus Mammillaria.
