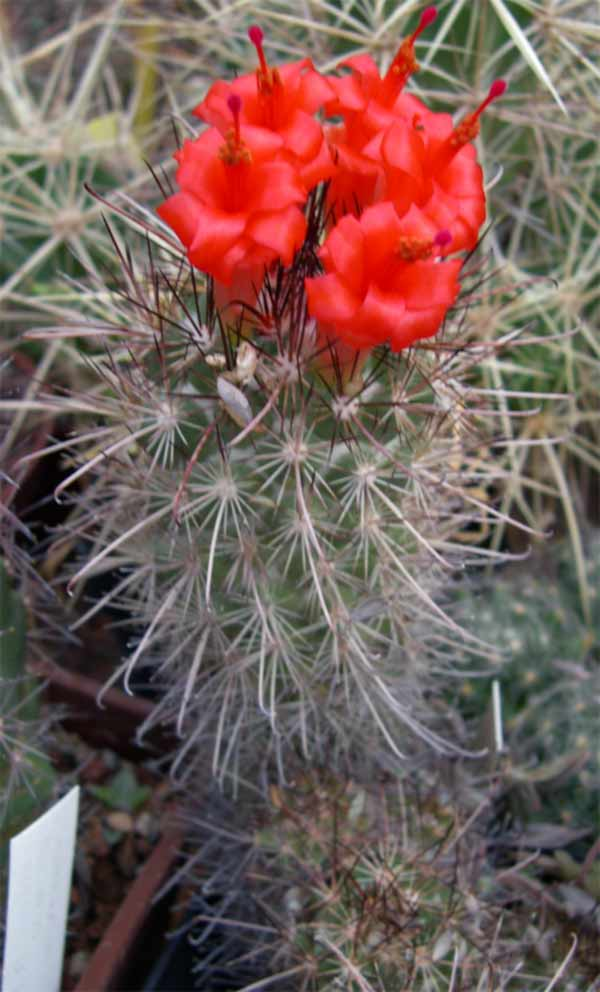

Scientific classification
- Kingdom: Plantae
- Clade: Tracheophytes
- Clade: Angiosperms
- Clade: Eudicots
- Order: Caryophyllales
- Family: Cactaceae
- Subfamily: Cactoideae
- Genus: Cochemiea
- Species: C. maritima

Binomial name
- Cochemiea maritima H.E.Gates ex. Shurly

Synonyms
- Cochemiea pondii subsp. maritima (G.E.Linds.) U.Guzmán 2003; Mammillaria maritima (G.E.Linds.) D.R.Hunt 1971; Mammillaria pondii subsp. maritima (G.E.Linds.) D.R.Hunt 1997

= Cochemiea maritima =

Species of cactus

Cochemiea maritima is a species of Cochemiea found in Mexico.

== Description ==
Cochemiea maritima grows in large groups up to one meter in diameter. The solid, cylindrical bodies, which are blue-green and stand upright, reach up to 50 cm (20 in) high and 3 to 7 cm (1.2 to 2.8 in) in diameter. There are about 10 to 15 white radial spines with black dots on smooth conical warts, up to 4 cm (1.6 in) long. The reddish-brown central spines, four in number, are curved like fishhooks and can be up to 5 cm (2.0 in) long. The zygomorphic flowers are trumpet-shaped with slightly curled perianths, scarlet red, and up to 3 cm (1.2 in) long. The spherical fruits are red, and the seeds are black.

== Distribution ==
Cochemiea maritima is found in the Mexican state of Baja California, occurring along the Pacific coast west of Punta Prieta on calcareous rocks on slopes.

== Taxonomy ==
The first description was made in 1937 by American botanist George Edmund Lindsay. The specific epithet "maritima" comes from Latin, meaning "concerning the sea," referring to the species' preferred habitat.
