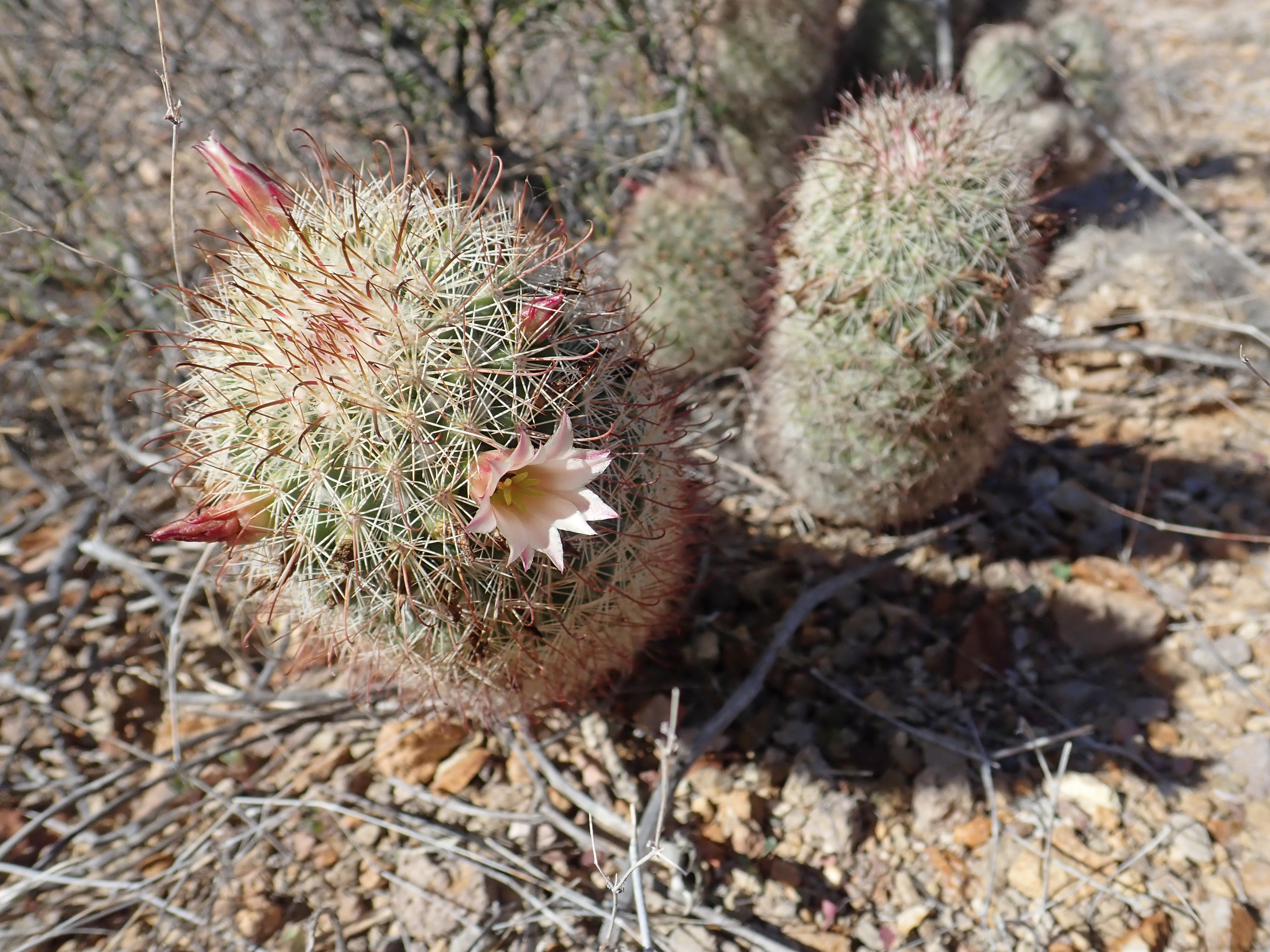

Scientific classification
- Kingdom: Plantae
- Clade: Tracheophytes
- Clade: Angiosperms
- Clade: Eudicots
- Order: Caryophyllales
- Family: Cactaceae
- Subfamily: Cactoideae
- Genus: Cochemiea
- Species: C. angelensis

Binomial name
- Cochemiea angelensis (R.T.Craig) P.B.Breslin & Majure

Synonyms
- Chilita angelensis (R.T.Craig) Buxb. 1954; Cochemiea dioica subsp. angelensis (R.T.Craig) Doweld 2000; Ebnerella angelensis (R.T.Craig) Buxb. 1951; Mammillaria angelensis R.T.Craig 1945; Mammillaria dioica subsp. angelensis (R.T.Craig) D.R.Hunt 1998; Mammillaria dioica f. angelensis (R.T.Craig) Neutel. 1986

= Cochemiea angelensis =

Species of cactus

Cochemiea angelensis is a species of plant in the family Cactaceae.

== Description ==
Cochemiea angelensis typically grows solitary but can form groups. The plants are globose to briefly cylindrical, reaching up to 15 cm (5.9 in) in height and about 6 cm (2.4 in) in diameter. The dark blue-green, conical warts have densely woolly axillae with white bristles up to 1 cm (0.39 in) long. There are 3 to 4 straight central spines, purplish-brown with a light base, up to 1.5 cm (0.59 in) long, with the lowest often longer and hooked. The 16 to 20 radial spines are stiff, smooth, white, and 0.5 to 1 cm (0.20 to 0.39 in) long. The flowers have two distinct color forms. The first is white, with pinkish midstripes on the outer petals; the second is much more deeply colored, with deep pink petals and maroon midstripe. The flowers grow up to 2 cm long and 3 cm (1.2 in) in diameter. The fruits are red and contain black seeds.

== Distribution ==
Cochemiea angelensis is endemic to Mexico, and can be found close to sea level to 300 meters, partway down the Baja California Peninsula, in the Bay of Bahía de los Ángeles and on Isla la Ventana and Isla Ángel de la Guarda.

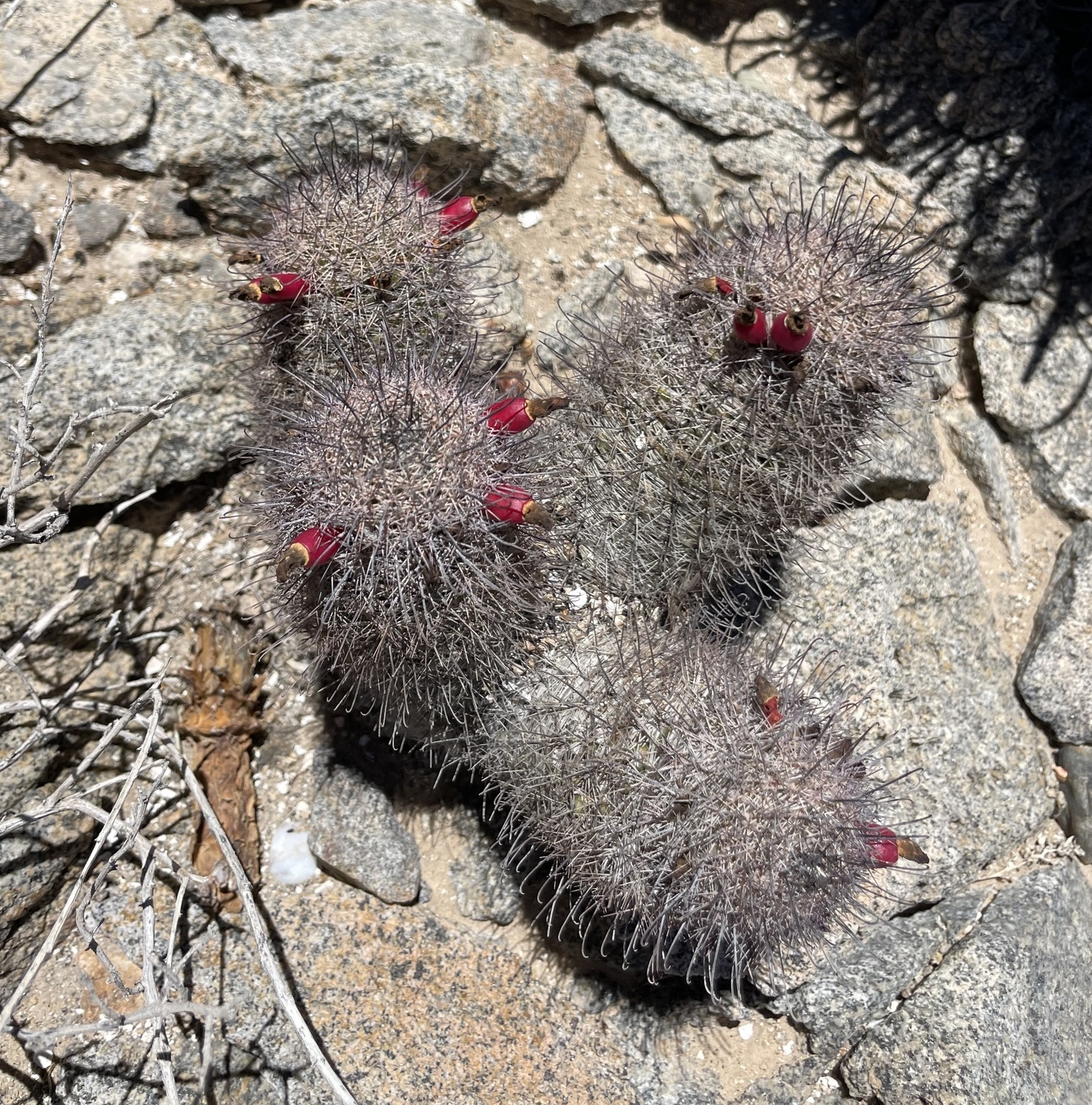
Plant fruiting in habitat in Isla Llave, Baja California, Mexico

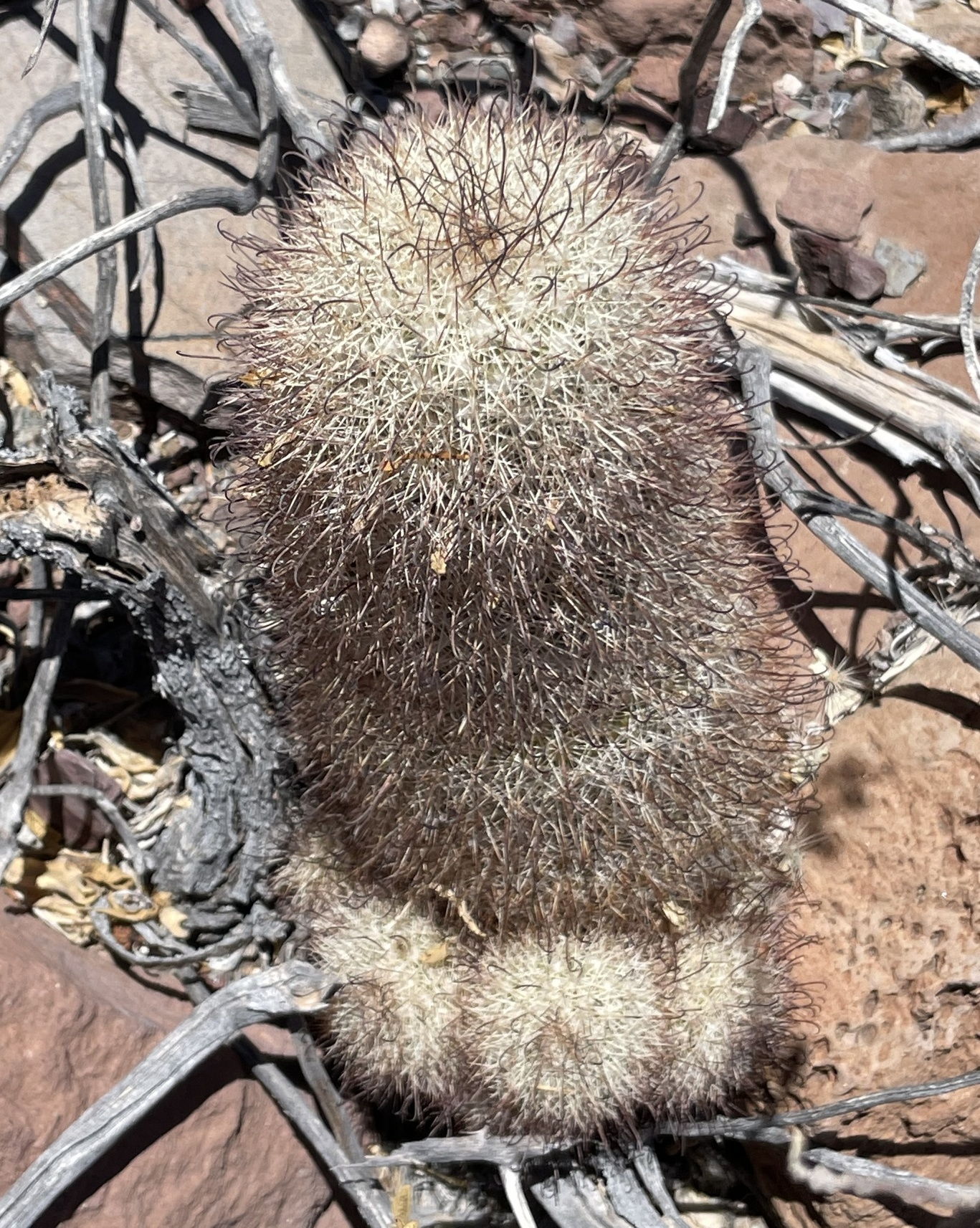
Habitat in Isla Ángel de la Guarda, Mexicali, Baja California,

== Taxonomy ==
Originally described as Mammillaria angelensis by Robert T. Craig in 1945, the species name refers to its presence on Isla Ángel de la Guarda. In 2021, Peter B. Breslin and Lucas C. Majure reclassified it into the genus Cochemiea.
