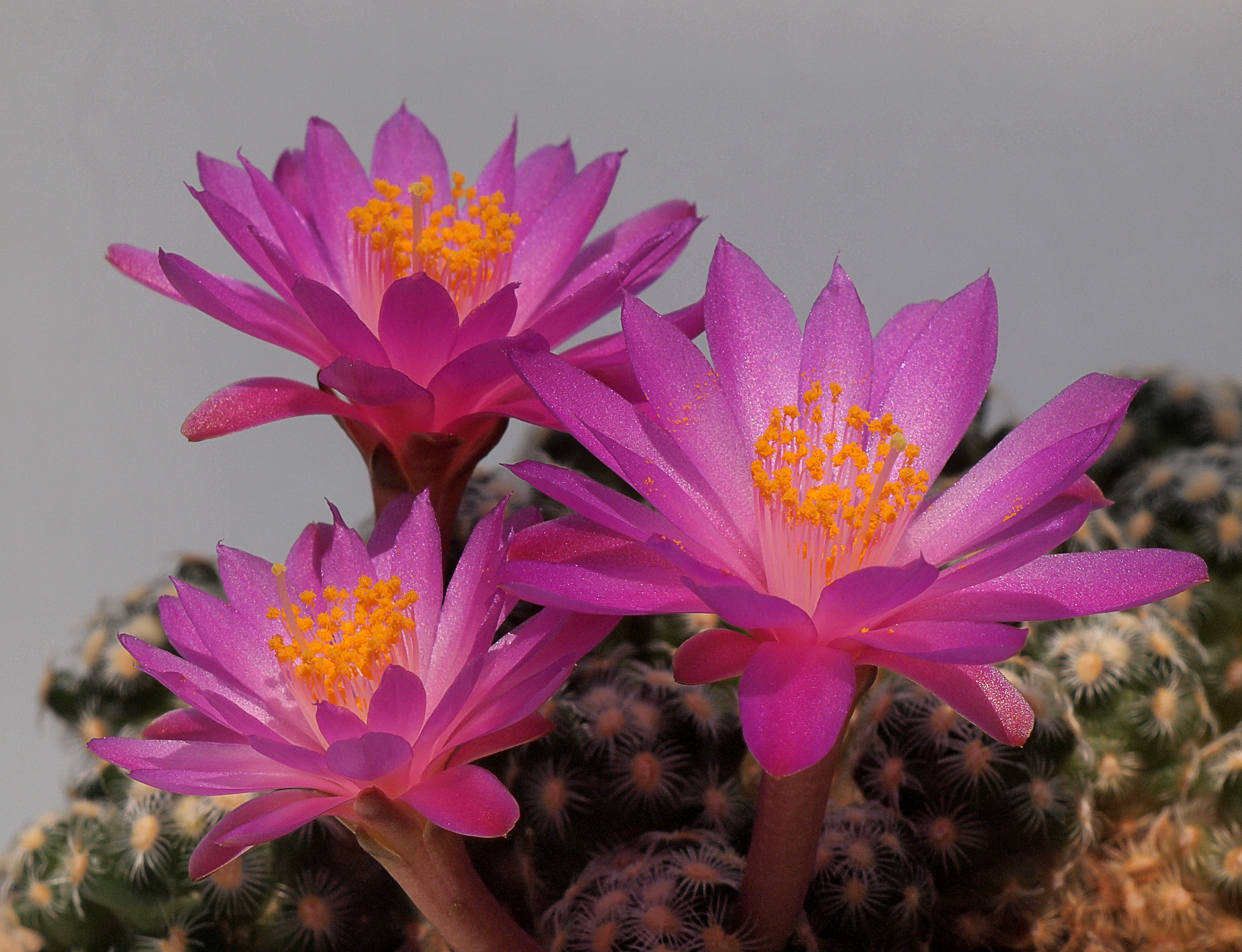

Conservation status
- Least Concern (IUCN 3.1)

Scientific classification
- Kingdom: Plantae
- Clade: Tracheophytes
- Clade: Angiosperms
- Clade: Eudicots
- Order: Caryophyllales
- Family: Cactaceae
- Subfamily: Cactoideae
- Genus: Cochemiea
- Species: C. saboae

Binomial name
- Cochemiea saboae (Glass) Doweld 2000

Synonyms
- Mammillaria saboae Glass 1966

= Cochemiea saboae =

Species of cactus

Cochemiea saboae is a species of Cochemiea found in Mexico.

== Description ==
Cochemiea saboae grows solitary or in small groups with fleshy roots. The green, egg-shaped shoots are 1 to 4 cm (0.39 to 1.57 in) long and 1 to 3.5 cm (0.39 to 1.38 in) in diameter. The small, slightly rounded, smooth warts do not produce milky juice. The axillae are naked, and central spines are usually absent, though a 2 mm (0.079 in)-long central spine has been observed rarely. The 17 to 45 radial spines are slender, glassy white, yellow at the base, and sometimes slightly curved, growing up to 2 mm (0.079 in) long.

The funnel-shaped flowers are pink and can grow up to 6.5 cm (2.6 in) long and wide. The fruits are embedded in the plant body and contain black seeds.

=== Subspecies ===
Accepted subspecies:

Image	Name	Distribution
	Cochemiea saboae subsp. goldii (Glass & R.A.Foster) Doweld	Mexico (NE. Sonora)
	Cochemiea saboae subsp. haudeana (A.B.Lau & K.Wagner) Doweld	Mexico (SE. Sonora)
	Cochemiea saboae subsp. saboae	Mexico (W. Chihuahua)

== Distribution ==
Cochemiea saboae is found in the Mexican states of Chihuahua, Sonora, and Durango at elevations between 2,100 and 2,200 meters growing on volcanic rock slabs.

== Taxonomy ==
Initially described as Mammillaria saboae by Charles Edward Glass in 1966, honoring American cactus collector Kathryn Sabo, it was reclassified to the genus Cochemiea by Alexander Borissovitch Doweld in 2000.
