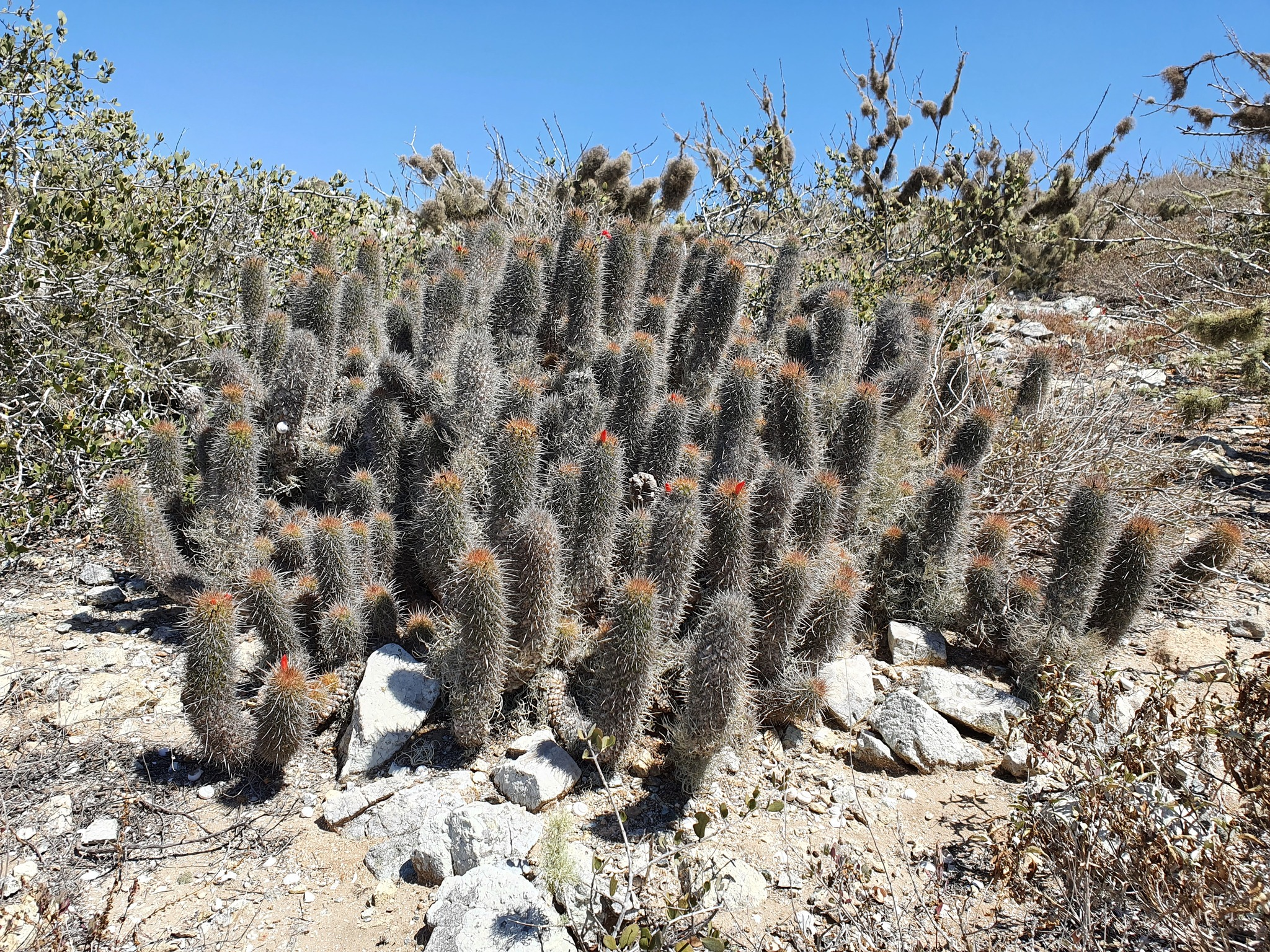
- Cochemiea halei

Scientific classification
- Kingdom: Plantae
- Clade: Tracheophytes
- Clade: Angiosperms
- Clade: Eudicots
- Order: Caryophyllales
- Family: Cactaceae
- Subfamily: Cactoideae
- Tribe: Cacteae
- Genus: Cochemiea (K.Brandegee) Walton

Type species
- Cochemiea halei

Species
- See text.

Synonyms
- Mammillaria subg. Cochemiea K.Brandegee, 1897; Bartschella Britton & Rose 1923; Chilita Orcutt 1926; Fimbriatocactus Guiggi 2023; Phellosperma Britton & Rose 1923

= Cochemiea =

Genus of cactus

Cochemiea is a genus of cactus. The group was previously synonymized with Mammillaria, until molecular phylogenetic studies determined that—when broadly circumscribed—Mammillaria is not monophyletic; thus, Cochemiea has been accepted as a distinct genus.

== Description ==
Species within the genus Cochemiea are characterized by their elongated, cylindrical stems covered in spirally arranged tubercles. These stems are typically green or bluish-green, measuring 3 to 7 cm in diameter and reaching heights of 7 to 50 cm, with some individuals exceptionally growing up to 200 cm. The areoles bear 7 to 25 radial spines, each 1 to 2 cm long and varying in color from white to yellow or reddish-brown. Additionally, they possess 1 to 6 central spines (occasionally up to 11), measuring 1 to 5 cm in length. These central spines can be white with black tips, reddish-brown, or black. Flowers are zygomorphic, arranged in two rows, and emerge from the axils at the stem apex. They measure 3 to 5 cm in length, open during the day, and are typically red or purple, spherical, and indehiscent with a smooth surface and a scar at the tip. The seeds are black and measure 0.5 to 1 mm in diameter.

== Distribution ==
The native range of Cochemiea extends from the southwestern and south-central United States into Mexico. Specific locations include Arizona, California, the Mexican Pacific Islands, the Gulf of Mexico region, Nevada, New Mexico, Texas, and Utah. These plants thrive in diverse habitats, from full sun to the shade of shrubs, and can be found on rocky cliffs and canyons at altitudes up to 1,800 meters above sea level.

== Taxonomy ==
The genus Cochemiea was initially described by American botanist Mary Katharine Brandegee as a subgenus within Mammillaria in 1897. In 1899, British botanist Frederick Arthur Walton elevated it to its current genus status in the publication Cactus Journal 2: 50. The genus name honors the extinct Cochimí indigenous tribe, who historically inhabited Baja California, a region within the natural distribution of these plants.

A 2021 molecular phylogenetic study of the "mammilloid clade", which included the genera Cochemiea, Coryphantha, Cumarinia, Escobaria, Mammillaria, Neolloydia and Ortegocactus, showed that it consisted of four monophyletic groups, which the authors re-circumscribed into four genera: Cumarinia; Mammillaria, with a reduced number of species; Coryphantha, expanded to include species previously placed in Mammillaria and Escobaria; and Cochemiea, expanded to include a large number of species previously placed in Mammillaria, as well as Neolloydia conoidea.

- Mammilloid clade
  - Cumarinia
  - - Mammillaria s.s.
    - - Coryphantha s.l.
      - Cochemiea s.l.

=== Species ===
In 2021, Breslin, Wojciechowski and Majure placed the following species in the genus, some already placed there and some moved from Mammillaria, Neolloydia, Neomammillaria and Ortegocactus. As of January 2026, Plants of the World Online accepted in the genus the species moved by Breslin et al.

Image	Scientific name	Distribution
	Cochemiea albicans (Britton & Rose) P.B.Breslin & Majure	Mexico (Baja California)
	Cochemiea angelensis (R.T.Craig) P.B.Breslin & Majure	Mexico
	Cochemiea armillata (K.Brandegee) P.B.Breslin & Majure	Mexico (Baja California Sur)
	Cochemiea barbata (Engelm.) Doweld	Mexico (Chihuahua, Durango)
	Cochemiea blossfeldiana (Boed.) P.B.Breslin & Majure	Mexico (Guadalupe, Baja California)
	Cochemiea boolii (G.E.Linds.) P.B.Breslin & Majure,	Mexico (Sonora)
	Cochemiea bullardiana (H.E.Gates) P.B.Breslin & Majure,	Mexico (Baja California)
	Cochemiea capensis (H.E.Gates) Doweld	Mexico (Baja California Sur, Sonora)
	Cochemiea cerralboa (Britton & Rose) P.B.Breslin & Majure	Mexico (Baja California Sur).
	Cochemiea dioica (K.Brandegee) Doweld	S. California to NW. Mexico
	Cochemiea estebanensis (G.E.Linds.) P.B.Breslin & Majure,	Mexico (Island San Esteban)
	Cochemiea fraileana (Britton & Rose) P.B.Breslin & Majure	Mexico (Baja California Sur).
	Cochemiea goodridgei (Scheer ex Salm-Dyck) P.B.Breslin & Majure	Mexico (Baja California).
	Cochemiea grahamii (Engelm.) Doweld	SE. California to W. Texas and Mexico (Baja California Norte to Chihuahua)
	Cochemiea guelzowiana (Werderm.) P.B.Breslin & Majure	Mexico (Durango, Coahuila, Nuevo León)
	Cochemiea halei (K.Brandegee) Walton	Mexico (Baja California)
	Cochemiea hutchisoniana (H.E.Gates) P.B.Breslin & Majure	Mexico (Baja California)
	Cochemiea insularis (H.E.Gates) P.B.Breslin & Majure	Mexico (Baja California)
	Cochemiea mainiae (K.Brandegee) P.B.Breslin & Majure	S. Arizona to NW. Mexico
	Cochemiea maritima H.E.Gates ex. Shurly	Mexico (W. Central Baja California)
	Cochemiea mazatlanensis (K.Schum.) D.Aquino & Dan.Sánchez	Mexico (Colima, Jalisco, Michoacan, Nayarit, Sinaloa, Sonora)
	Cochemiea multidigitata (Radley & G.E.Linds.) P.B.Breslin	Mexico (Sonora).
	Cochemiea palmeri (J.M.Coult.) P.B.Breslin & Majure	Mexico (Baja California)
	Cochemiea phitauiana (E.M.Baxter) Doweld	Mexico (Baja California).
	Cochemiea pondii (Greene) Walton	Mexico (Island Cedros)
	Cochemiea poselgeri (Hildm.) Britton & Rose	Mexico (Baja California Sur)
	Cochemiea saboae (Glass) Doweld	Mexico (E. Sonora, W. Chihuahua)
	Cochemiea schumannii (Hildm.) P.B.Breslin & Majure	Mexico (Baja California Sur).
	Cochemiea setispina Walton	Mexico (C. Baja California).
	Cochemiea sheldonii (Britton & Rose) Doweld	Arizona to Mexico (Sonora, Sinaloa, W. Chihuahua)
	Cochemiea tetrancistra (Engelm.) P.B.Breslin & Majure	SW. U.S.A. to NW. Mexico
	Cochemiea theresae (Cutak) Doweld	Mexico (Durango, Zacatecas).
	Cochemiea thomasii García-Mor. & al.	Mexico (Sinaloa)
	Cochemiea thornberi (Orcutt) P.B.Breslin & Majure	S. Arizona to Mexico (Sonora).
	Cochemiea viridiflora (Britton & Rose) P.B.Breslin & Majure	Arizona to SW. New Mexico.
	Cochemiea wrightii (Engelm.) Doweld	E. Arizona to W. Texas and N. Mexico.
