= Chihuahuan Desert =

Largest desert in North America

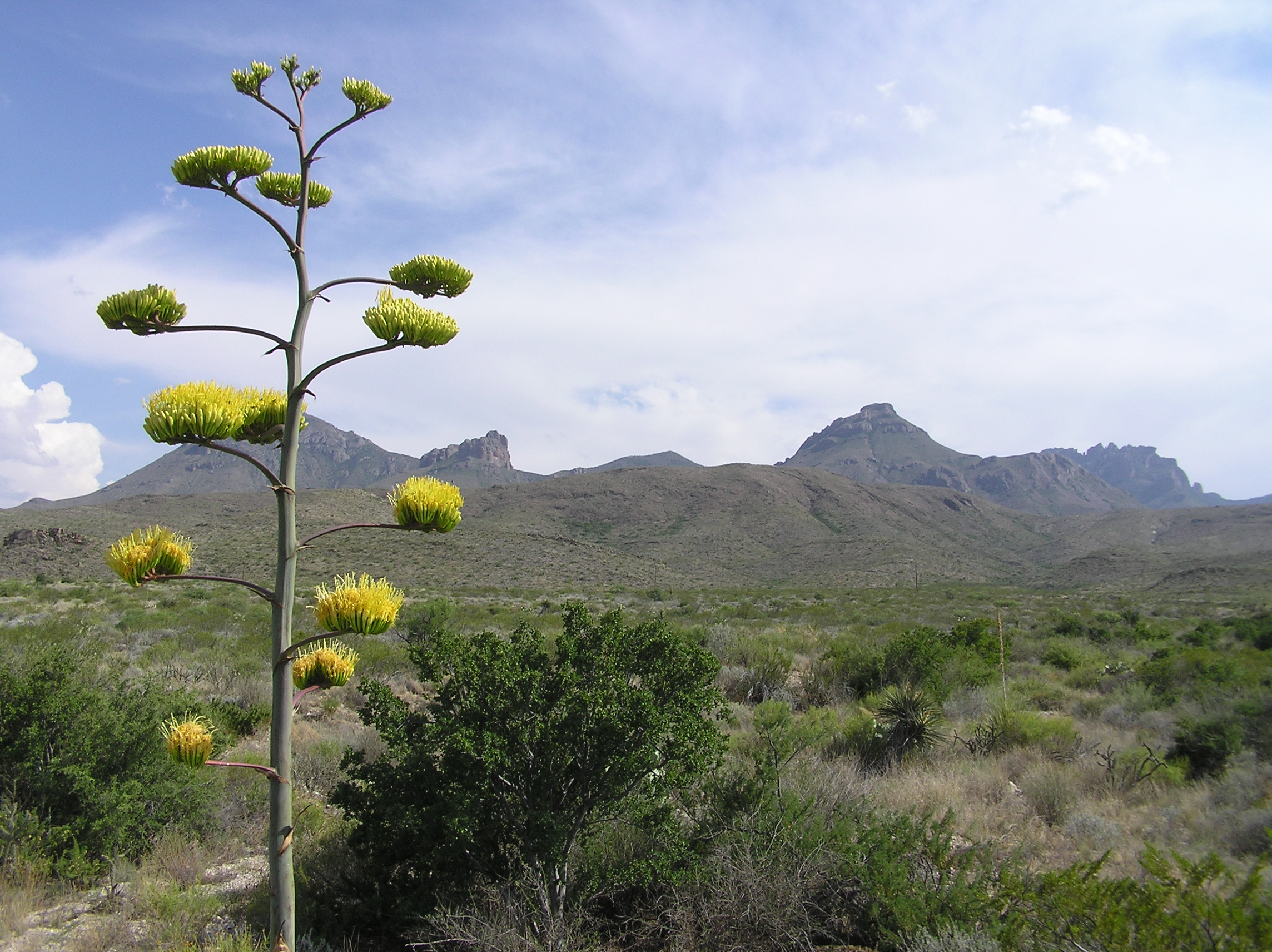
- Chihuahuan desert landscape in Big Bend National Park

- Location map of the Chihuahuan Desert

Ecology
- Realm: Nearctic
- Biome: Deserts and xeric shrublands
- Borders: List: Arizona Mountains forests; Colorado Plateau shrublands; Edwards Plateau savanna; Meseta Central matorral; Sierra Madre Occidental pine–oak forests; Sierra Madre Oriental pine–oak forests; Sonoran Desert; Tamaulipan matorral; Tamaulipan mezquital; Western short grasslands

Geography
- Area: 501,896 km^{2} (193,783 mi^{2})
- Countries: Mexico; United States
- States: List: Chihuahua; Coahuila; Durango; Nuevo León; Sonora; Zacatecas; Arizona; New Mexico; Texas
- Coordinates: 30°32′26″N 103°50′14″W
- Oceans or seas: None
- Rivers: Rio Grande
- Climate type: Hot desert (BWh) and hot semi-arid (BSh)

Conservation
- Conservation status: Vulnerable
- Global 200: Yes
- Protected: 35,905 km^{2} (13,863 sq mi) (7%)

The Chihuahuan Desert (Spanish: Desierto de Chihuahua, Desierto Chihuahuense) is a desert ecoregion designation covering parts of northern Mexico and the southwestern United States. It occupies much of Far West Texas, the middle to lower Rio Grande Valley and the lower Pecos Valley in New Mexico, and a portion of southeastern Arizona, as well as the central and northern portions of the Mexican Plateau. It is bordered on the west by the Sonoran Desert, the Colorado Plateau, and the extensive Sierra Madre Occidental range, along with the northwestern lowlands of the Sierra Madre Oriental range. Its largest, continual expanse is located in Mexico, covering a large portion of the state of Chihuahua, along with portions of Coahuila, north-eastern Durango, the extreme northern part of Zacatecas, and small western portions of Nuevo León. With an area of about 501,896 km^{2} (193,783 sq mi), it is the largest hot desert in North America. The desert is fairly young, existing for only 8,000 years.

== Geography ==
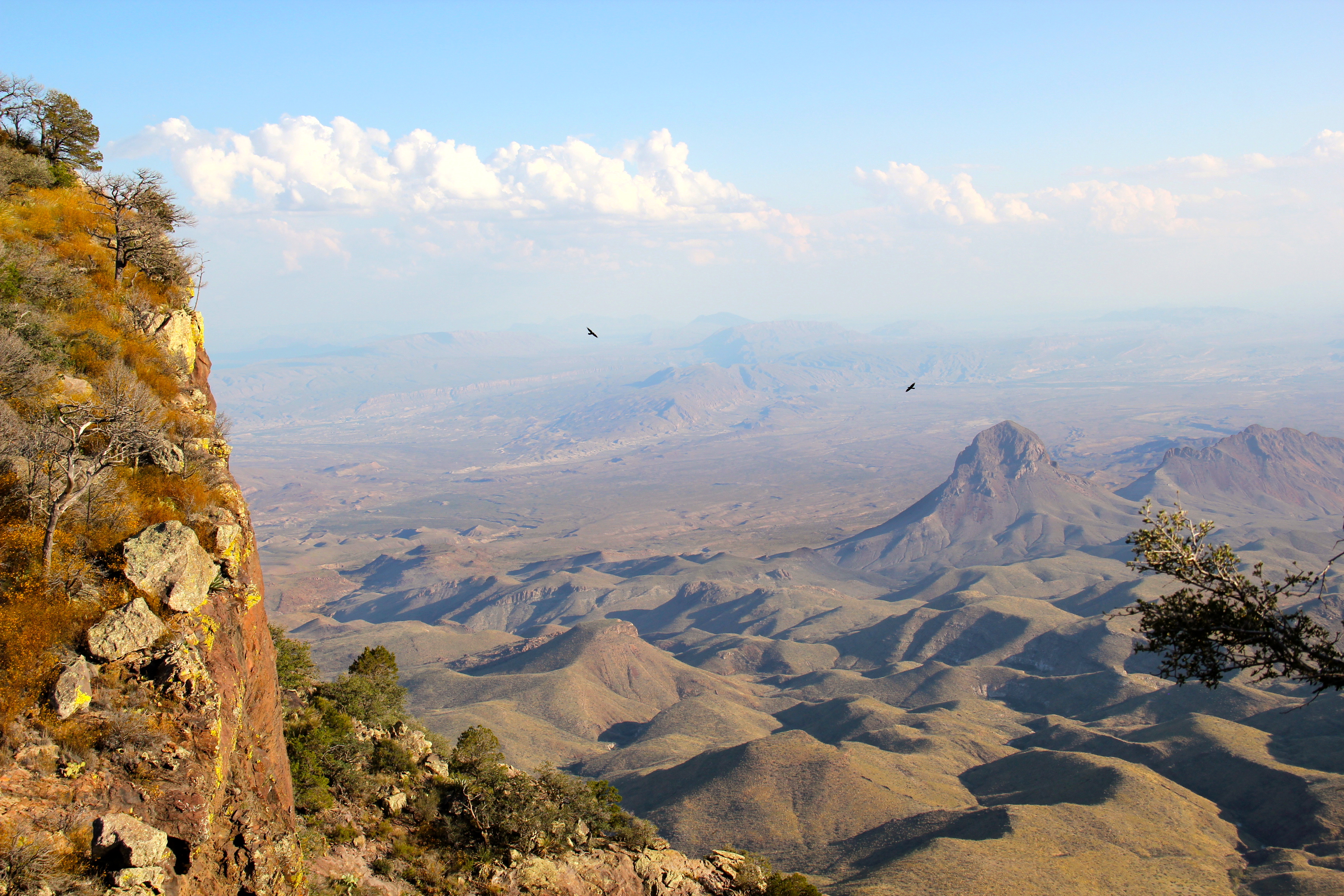
The terrain mainly consists of basins broken by numerous small mountain ranges.

There are several larger mountain ranges in the Chihuahuan Desert, including the Sierra Madre, the Sierra del Carmen, the Organ Mountains, the Franklin Mountains, the Sacramento Mountains, the Chisos Mountains, the Guadalupe Mountains, and the Davis Mountains. These create "sky islands" of cooler, wetter, climates adjacent to, or within the desert, and such elevated areas have both coniferous and broadleaf woodlands, including forests along drainages and favored exposures. The lower elevations of the Sandia–Manzano Mountains, the Magdalena–San Mateo Mountains, and the Gila Region partly border the Chihuahuan Desert and partly border other ecoregions that are not deserts.

There are few urban areas within the desert: the largest is Ciudad Juárez with almost two million inhabitants; Chihuahua, Saltillo, and Torreón; and the US cities of El Paso, Alamogordo, Albuquerque, Alpine, Benson, Carlsbad, Carrizozo, Deming, Fort Stockton, Fort Sumner, Las Cruces, Marfa, Pecos, Roswell, and Willcox are among the other communities in this ecoregion. Safford and Benson in Arizona are located in low elevations of the western edges of the Chihuahuan Desert, but in an ecotone with the Sonoran Desert.

According to the World Wide Fund for Nature the Chihuahuan Desert may be the most biologically diverse desert in the world as measured by species richness or endemism. The region has been badly degraded, mainly due to grazing. Many native grasses and other species have become dominated by woody native plants, including creosote bush and mesquite, due to overgrazing and other urbanization. The Mexican wolf, once abundant, was nearly extinct and remains on the endangered species list.

== Climate ==
The desert is mainly a rain shadow desert because the two main mountain ranges which bound the desert, the Sierra Madre Occidental to the west and the Sierra Madre Oriental to the east, block most moisture from the Pacific Ocean and the Gulf of Mexico, respectively. Climatically, the desert mostly has an arid, mesothermal climate with one rainy season in the late summer and smaller amounts of precipitation in early winter, the mean daily temperature of the coldest month is warmer than 0 °C (32 °F). The majority of rain falls between late June and early October during the North American Monsoon, when moist air from the Gulf of Mexico and the Sea of Cortez penetrates into the region, or much less frequently, when a tropical cyclone moves inland and stalls.

Owing to its inland position and higher elevation than the Sonoran Desert to the west, mostly varying from 480 to 1,800 m (1,575 to 5,906 ft) in elevation, the desert has a slightly milder climate in the summer (though usually daytime June temperatures are in the range of 32 to 40 °C or 90 to 104 °F), with mild to cool winters and occasional to frequent freezes. The hottest temperatures in the desert occur in lower elevation areas and valleys, including near the Rio Grande from El Paso into the Big Bend, plus lower elevation valleys to the Bolson de Mapimi. A subtropical temperature regime describes lower elevations in the Texas Big Bend region up to the Presidio and Candelaria areas, then southward into similar elevations, while a warm temperate temperature regime describes higher elevations and areas farther north. The average annual temperature in the desert varies from about 13 to 22 °C (55 to 72 °F), depending on elevation and latitude.

The mean annual precipitation for the Chihuahuan Desert is 235 mm (9.3 in) with a range of approximately 150–400 mm (6–16 in), although it receives more precipitation than most other warm desert ecoregions. Nearly two-thirds of the arid zone stations have annual totals between 225 and 275 mm (8.9 and 10.8 in). Snowfall is scant except at the higher elevation edges. Northern and eastern portions have more definite winters than southern and western portions, receiving a portion of winter precipitation as snowfall most winters.

== Flora ==
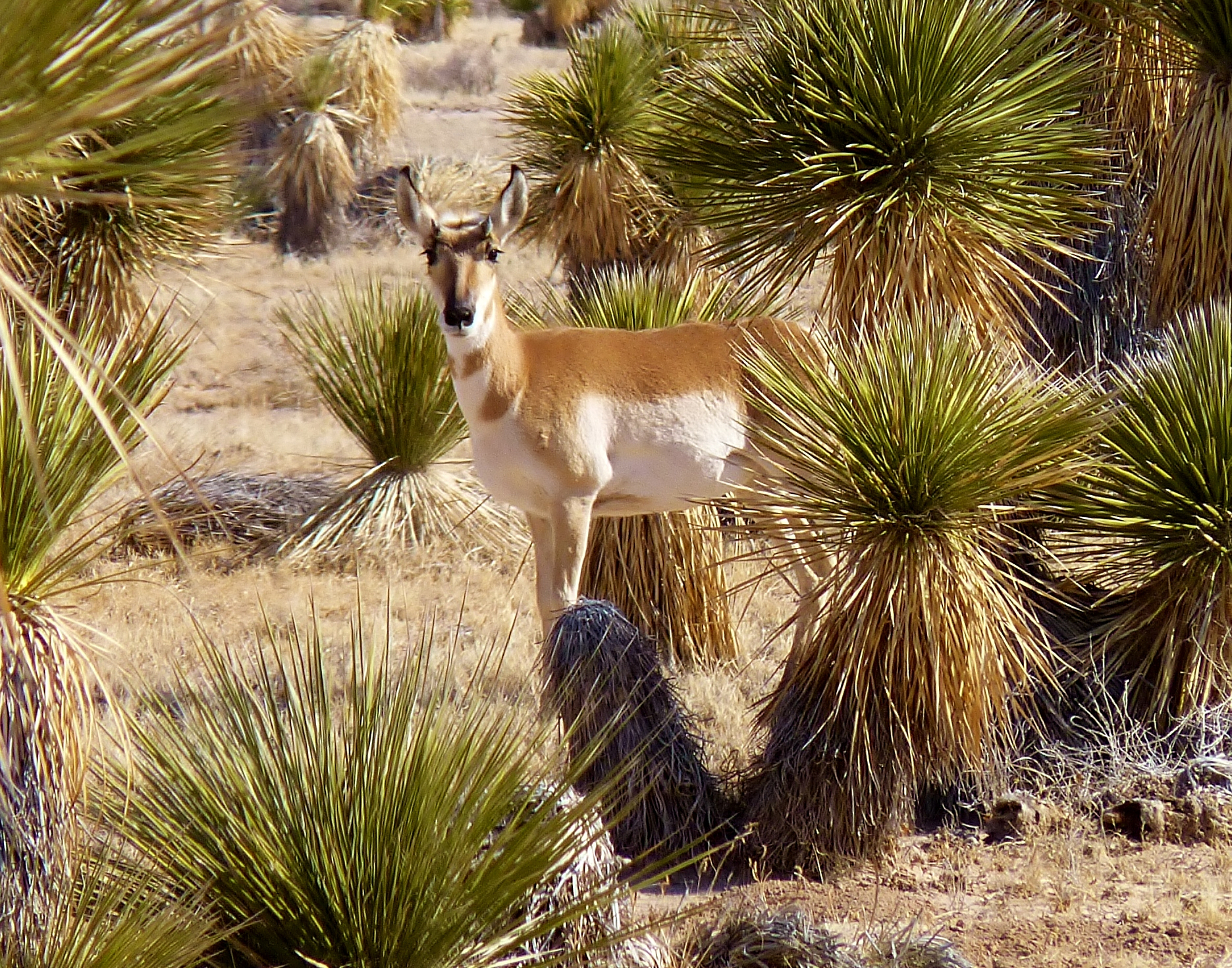
A pronghorn among yuccas in the Otero Mesa.

The creosote bush (Larrea tridentata) is the dominant plant species on gravelly and occasional sandy soils in valley areas within the Chihuahuan Desert. The other species found with creosote bush depend on factors including the soil type, elevation, and degree of slope. Viscid acacia (Vachellia vernicosa), fourwing saltbush (Atriplex canescens), and tarbush (Flourensia cernua) are common in the desert scrub communities of northern portions, while broom dalea (Psorothamnus scoparius) occurs on sandy soils in western portions. Yucca and numerous Opuntia species are abundant on slopes and uplands in most areas, while Arizona rainbow cactus (Echinocereus polyacanthus) and Mexican fire-barrel cactus (Ferocactus pilosus) inhabit portions near the US–Mexico border.

Trees are less common than in nearby mountainous regions or the Sonoran Desert, due to greater aridity and less favorable precipitation seasons, but there are several common species in arroyos, floodplains, and mountain edges or canyons. Trees are often smaller in stature than in wetter areas, but those most common in Chihuahuan Desert arroyos include desert willow or mimbre (Chilopsis linearis), honey mesquite (Neltuma glandulosa), netleaf hackberry (Celtis reticulata), and whitethorn (Vachellia constricta). Riparian floodplains in the ecoregion include Rio Grande cottonwood (Populus deltoides ssp. wislizeni), western cottonwood (Populus fremontii), and velvet ash (Fraxinus velutina); tornillo or screwbean mesquite (Prosopis pubescens) is limited to a few major river drainages, such as the Rio Grande, and mostly in the floodplains.

Herbaceous plants, such as bush muhly (Muhlenbergia porteri), blue grama (Bouteloua gracilis), gypsum grama (B. breviseta), and hairy grama (B. hirsuta), are dominant in desert grasslands and near the mountain edges including the Sierra Madre Occidental. Lechuguilla (Agave lechuguilla), honey mesquite (Prosopis glandulosa), Opuntia macrocentra and Echinocereus pectinatus are the dominant species in western Coahuila. Ocotillo (Fouquieria splendens), lechuguilla, and Yucca filifera are the most common species in the southeastern part of the desert. Candelilla (Euphorbia antisyphilitica), Mimosa zygophylla, Acacia glandulifera and Agave lechuguilla are found in areas with well-draining, shallow soils. The shrubs found near the Sierra Madre Oriental are exclusively lechuguilla, guapilla (Hechtia glomerata), Queen Victoria's agave (Agave victoriae-reginae), sotol (Dasylirion spp.), and barreta (Helietta parvifolia), while the well-developed herbaceous layer includes grasses, legumes, and cacti.

Desert or arid grasslands comprise 20% of this desert and are often mosaics of shrubs and grasses. They include purple three-awn (Aristida purpurea), black grama (Bouteloua eriopoda), and sideoats grama (Bouteloua curtipendula). Early Spanish explorers reported encountering grasses that were "belly high to a horse"; most likely big alkali sacaton (Sporobolus wrightii) and tobosa (Pleuraphis mutica) along floodplain or bottomland areas.

The United Nations Environment Programme reported in 2006 that nearly half of the bird, mammal, and butterfly species in the Chihuahuan Desert are expected to be replaced by other species by 2055 due to climate change.

== Protected areas ==
A 2017 assessment found that 35,905 km^{2} (13,863 sq mi), or 7%, of the ecoregion is in protected areas. Protected areas include Buenos Aires National Wildlife Refuge in Arizona; Janos Biosphere Reserve, Médanos de Samalayuca Natural Protected Area and Cañón de Santa Elena Flora and Fauna Protection Area in Chihuahua; Cuatro Ciénegas Basin, Ocampo Flora and Fauna Protection Area, and part of Maderas del Carmen Biosphere Reserve in Coahuila; Mapimí Biosphere Reserve and Cañón de Fernández State Park in Durango; Bitter Lake National Wildlife Refuge, Bosque del Apache National Wildlife Refuge, Carlsbad Caverns National Park, Carrizozo Malpais, Oliver Lee Memorial State Park, Organ Mountains–Desert Peaks National Monument, Petroglyph National Monument, Sevilleta National Wildlife Refuge, and White Sands National Park in New Mexico; and Big Bend National Park, Big Bend Ranch State Park, Black Gap Wildlife Management Area, Franklin Mountains State Park, and part of Guadalupe Mountains National Park in Texas.

== Gallery ==
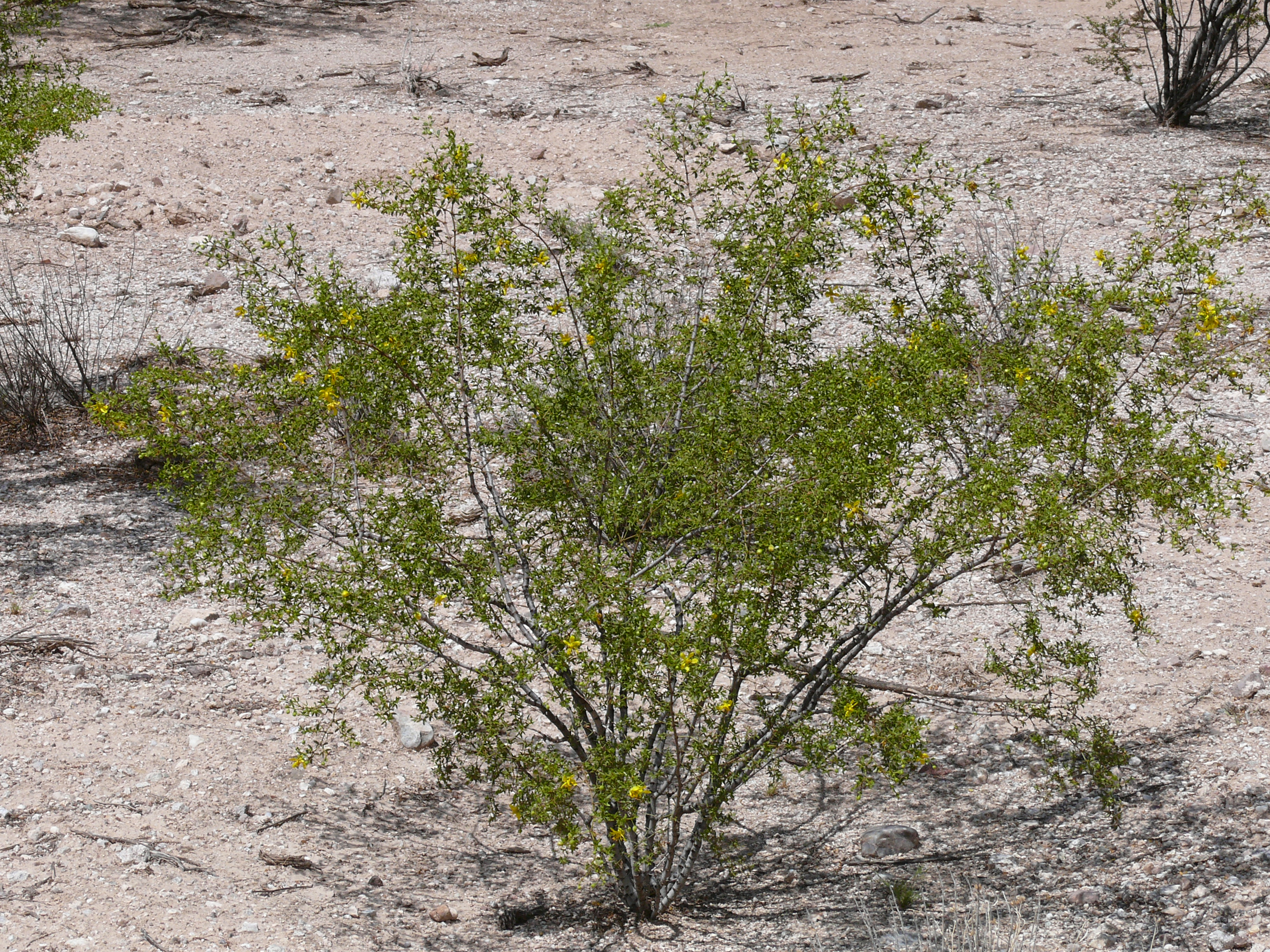
Young creosote bush (Larrea tridentata)

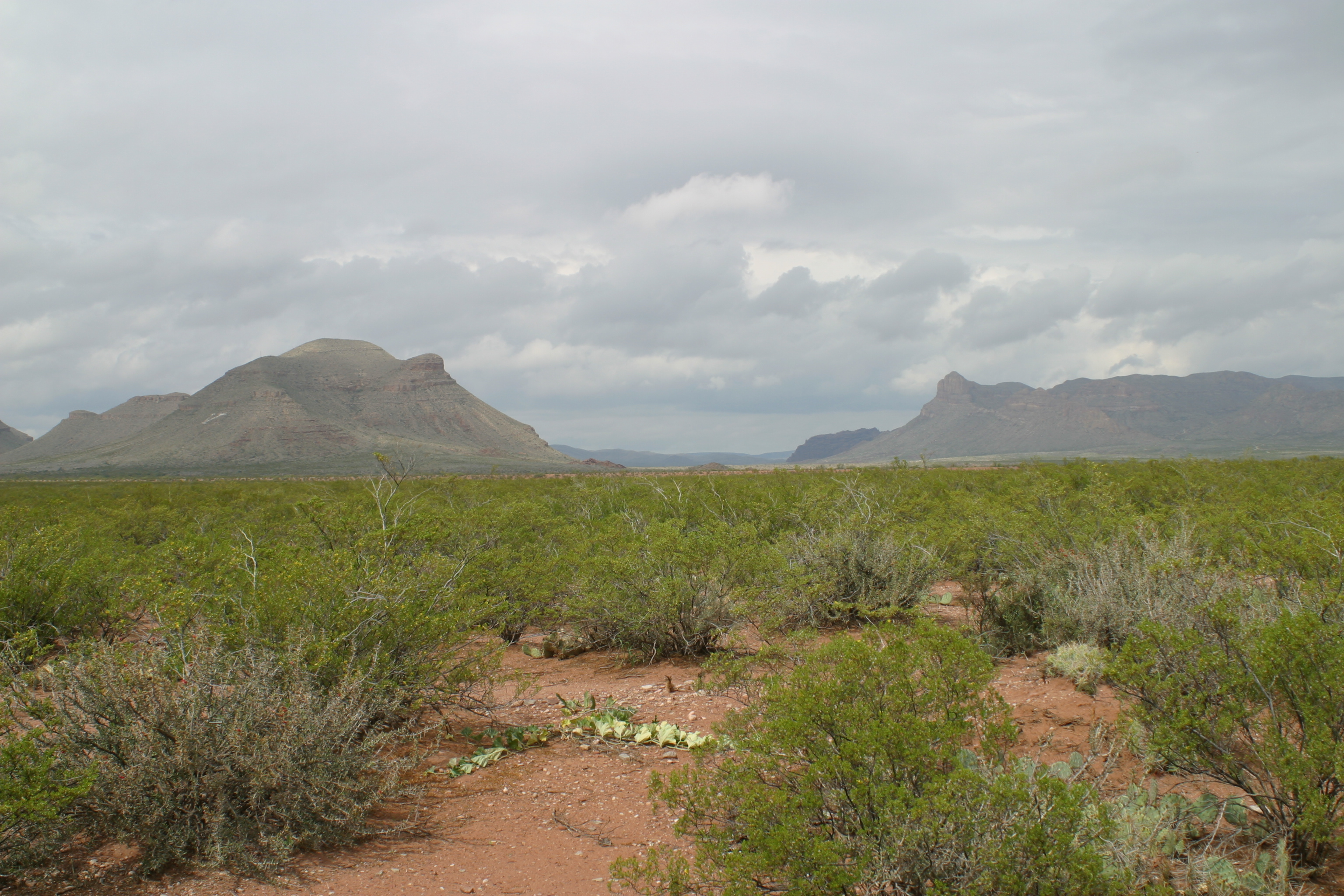
Yucca, creosote, buffalo gourd, and mesquite typify the plants in the Chihuahuan Desert

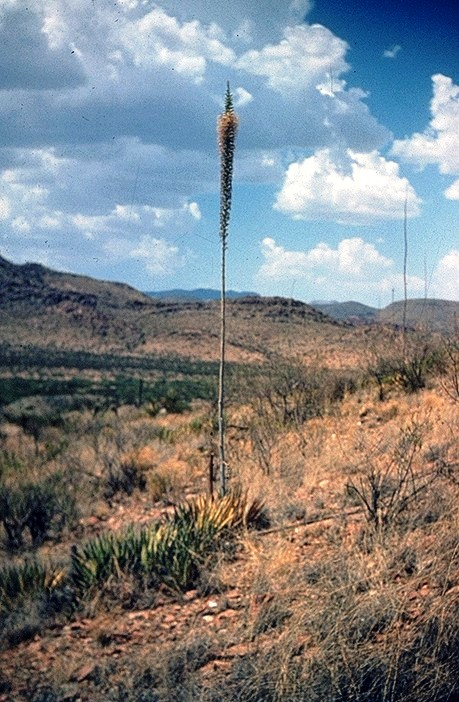
Lechuguilla (Agave lechuguilla)—one of the indicator plants of the Chihuahuan Desert

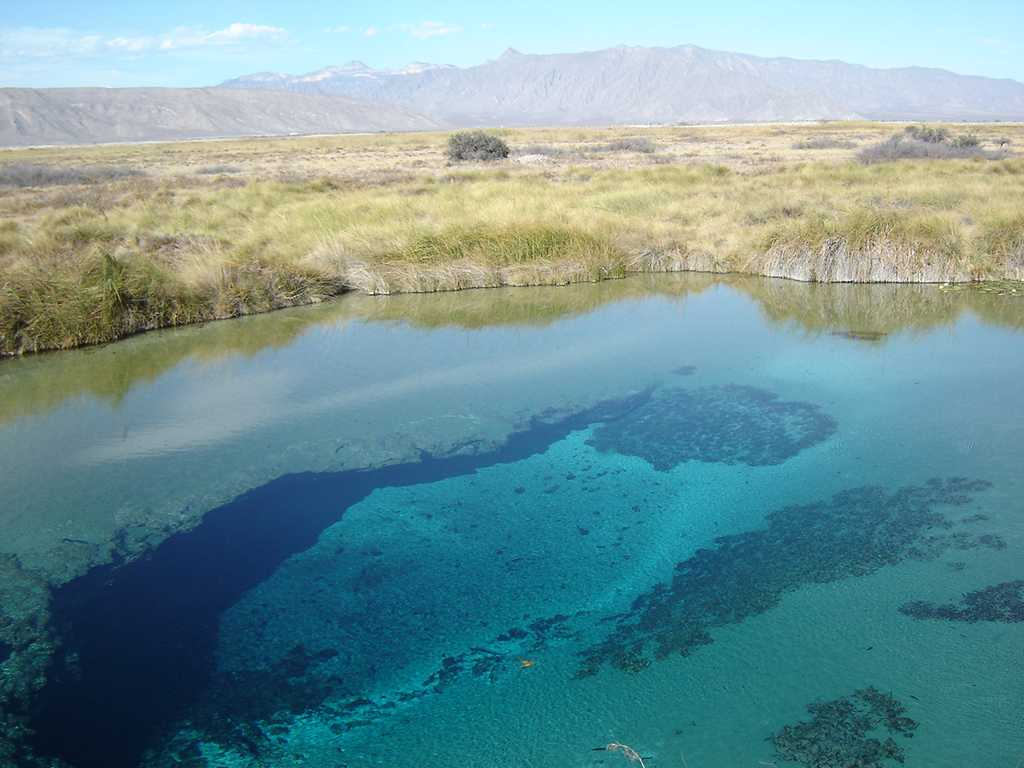
Poza Azul, one of many a springs in the Cuatro Ciénegas Basin in central Coahuila, Mexico (2009).

== See also ==
- List of deserts by area
- List of ecoregions in the United States (WWF)
- List of geographical regions in Texas
- McKittrick Canyon
- Malpai Borderlands
- Pecos River
- Samalayuca Dune Fields
- Sky islands
- Solitario formation
- Sonoran Desert
- Trans-Pecos
- West Texas
