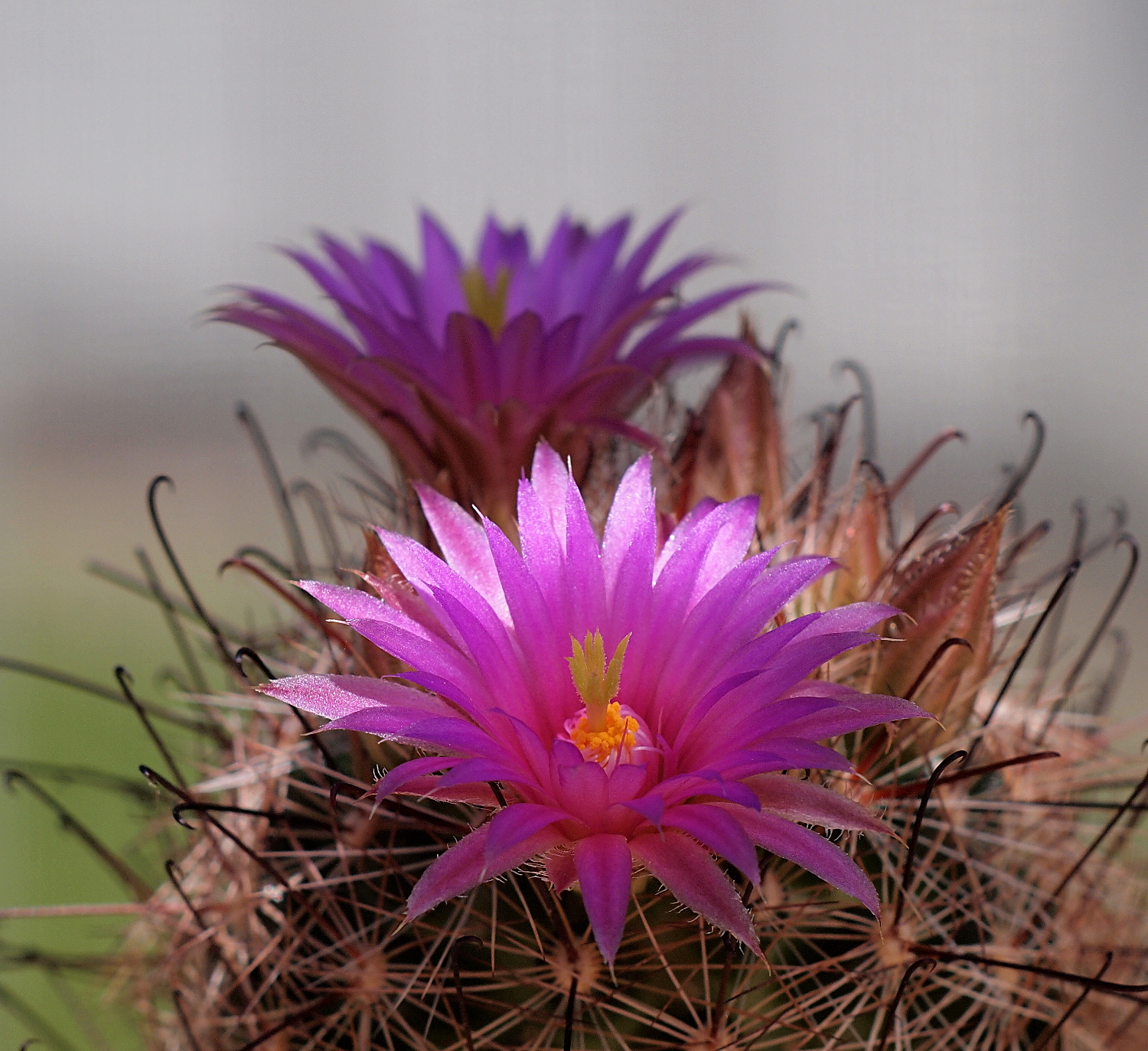

Conservation status
- Least Concern (IUCN 3.1)

Scientific classification
- Kingdom: Plantae
- Clade: Tracheophytes
- Clade: Angiosperms
- Clade: Eudicots
- Order: Caryophyllales
- Family: Cactaceae
- Subfamily: Cactoideae
- Genus: Cochemiea
- Species: C. wrightii

Binomial name
- Cochemiea wrightii (Engelm.) Doweld 2000

Synonyms
- Cactus wrightii (Engelm.) Kuntze 1891; Chilita wrightii (Engelm.) Orcutt 1926; Ebnerella wrightii (Engelm.) Buxb. 1951; Fimbriatocactus wrightii (Engelm.) Guiggi 2023; Mammillaria wrightii Engelm. 1856; Neomammillaria wrightii (Engelm.) Britton & Rose 1923

= Cochemiea wrightii =

Species of cactus

Cochemiea wrightii is a species of Cochemiea found in Mexico and the southern United States.

== Description ==
Cochemiea wrightii grows as a solitary cactus with dark green, flattened, spherical to briefly cylindrical shoots measuring 3 to 8 cm (1.2 to 3.1 in) in diameter. The cylindrical warts do not produce milky juice, and the axillae are bare. It has up to 3 dark, hooked central spines, each 1 to 1.2 cm (0.39 to 0.47 in) long. There are also up to 12 whitish marginal spines, 8 to 12 millimeters long, with the upper ones being shorter and dark-tipped.

The flowers are magenta to bright purple, rarely white, and up to 2.5 cm (0.98 in) long and wide, with perianth segments that are reflexed. The egg-shaped to spherical fruits are purple, up to 2.5 cm (0.98 in) long, and contain black seeds.

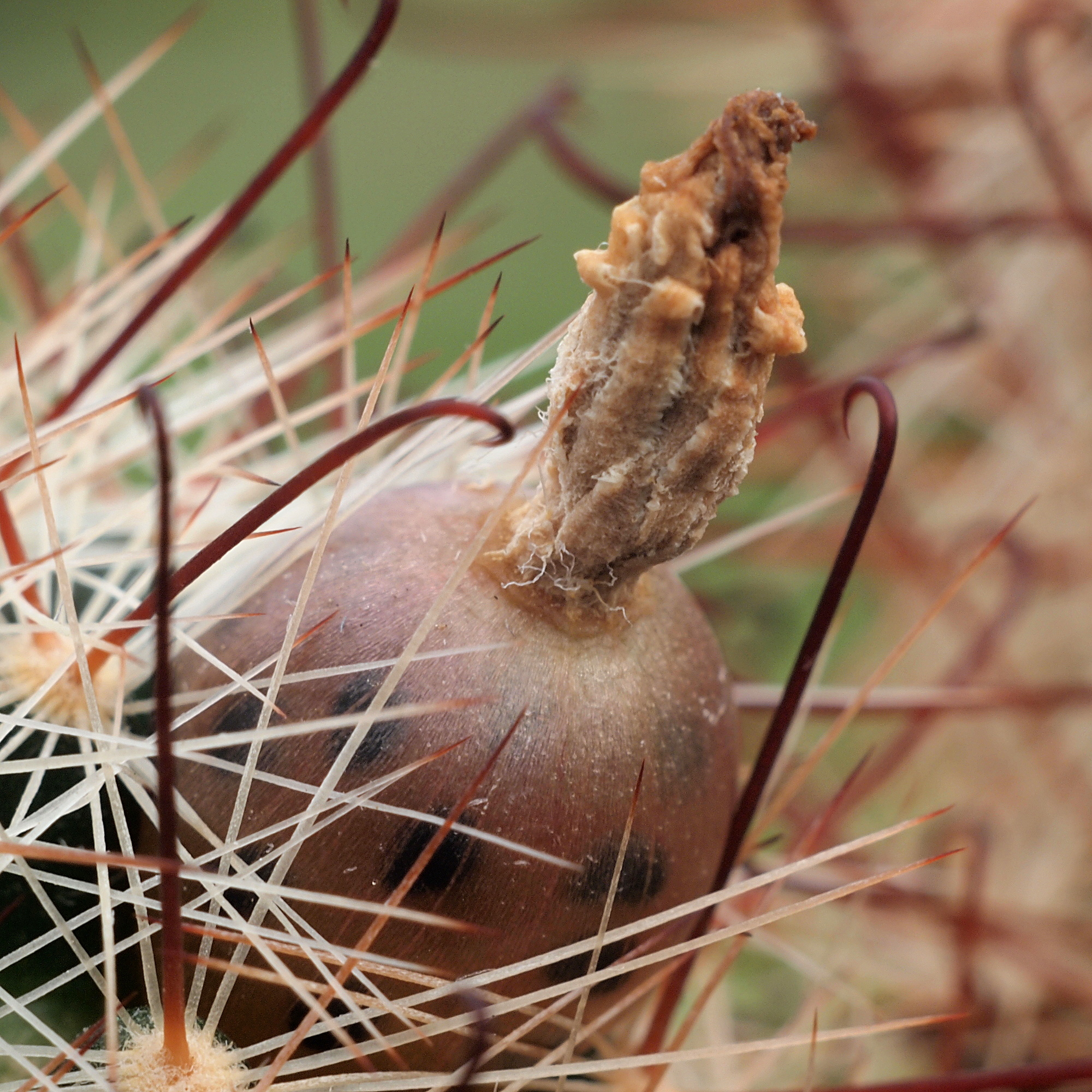
Fruit

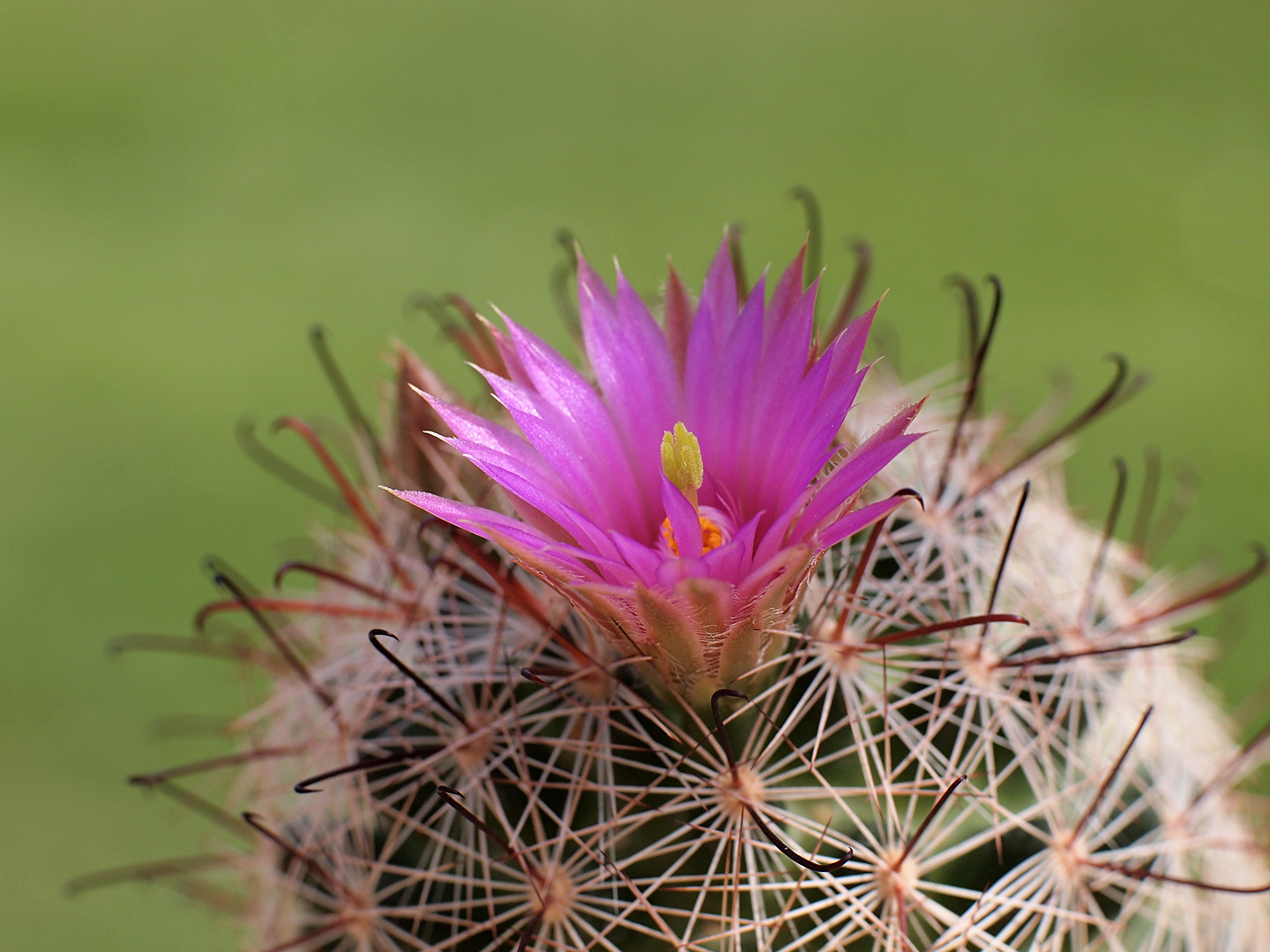
Flower

== Distribution ==
Cochemiea wrightii is found in the US states of Arizona and New Mexico, and in the Mexican states of Sonora and Chihuahua at elevations of 1,000 to 2,200 m (3,300 to 7,200 ft). Plants are found growing in sandy hills and grasslands growing among Echinocereus polyacanthus and Cochemiea saboae subsp. haudeana.

=== Subspecies ===
Accepted subspecies:

Image	Name	Distribution
	Cochemiea wrightii subsp. wilcoxii (Toumey ex K.Schum.) Doweld	Arizona to New Mexico and Mexico (Sonora, Chihuahua)
	Cochemiea wrightii subsp. wrightii	Arizona to Texas

== Taxonomy ==
The species was first described as Mammillaria wrightii by George Engelmann in 1856. The specific epithet honors American botanist Charles Wright, who researched Texas and Cuba. In 2000, Alexander Borissovitch Doweld reclassified the species into the genus Cochemiea.
