= Cañon de Fernández State Park =

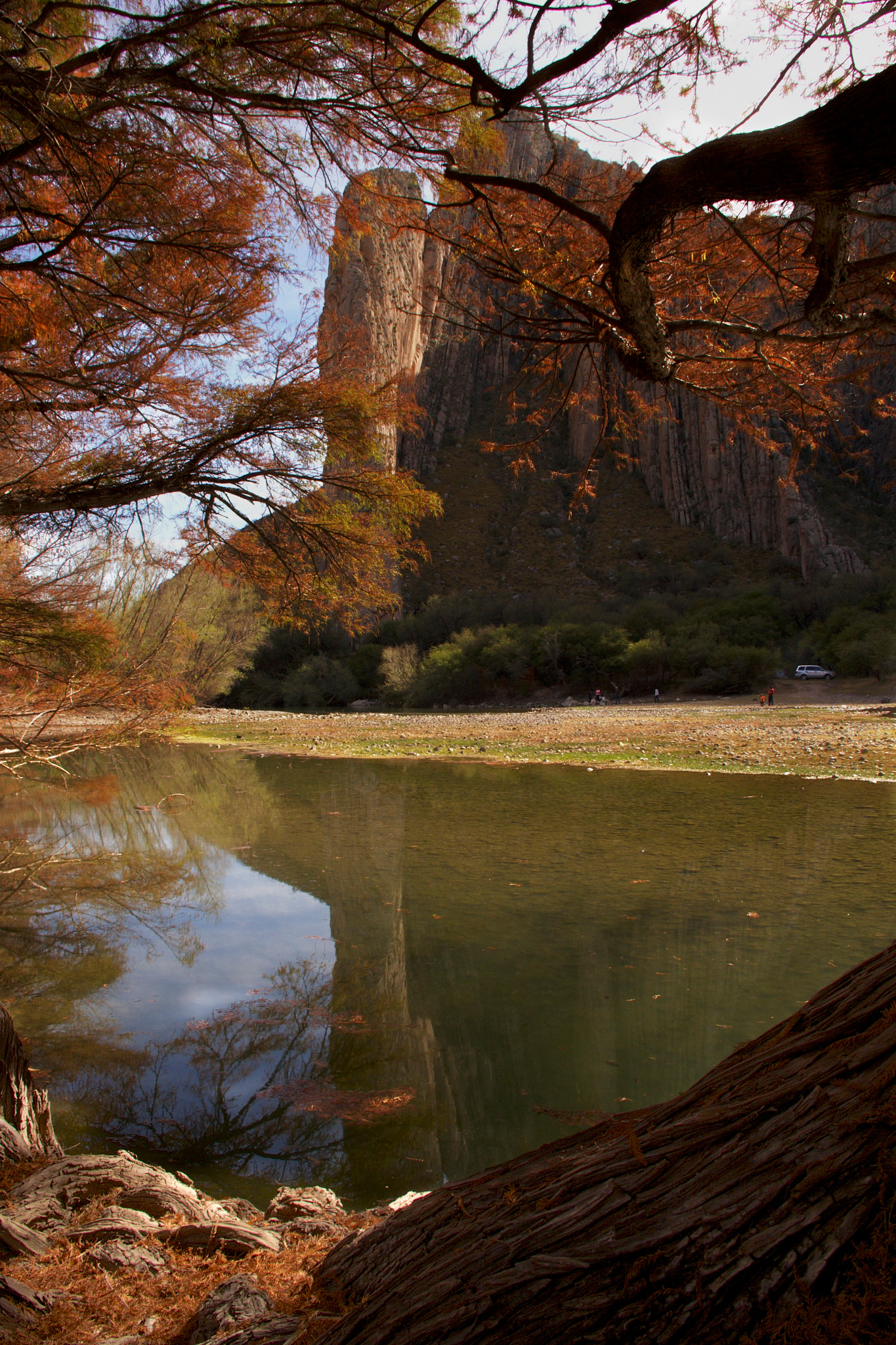

- Location within Mexico
- Location: Durango, Mexico
- Coordinates: 25.336°N 103.746°W
- Area: 17,019 ha (65.71 sq mi)
- Designated: 2004

Ramsar Wetland
- Official name: Parque Estatal Cañón de Fernández
- Designated: 2 February 2008
- Reference no.: 1747

Cañon de Fernandez State Park is a natural protected area in the northern Mexican state of Durango. It covers 17,000 hectares straddling the Nazas River in Lerdo Municipality, right in the middle of the Chihuahuan Desert. It was protected by the government of Durango in 2004 and it was named a Ramsar wetland in 2008, the only Ramsar site in Durango and the second in the Chihuahuan Desert after Cuatrocienegas, Coahuila.

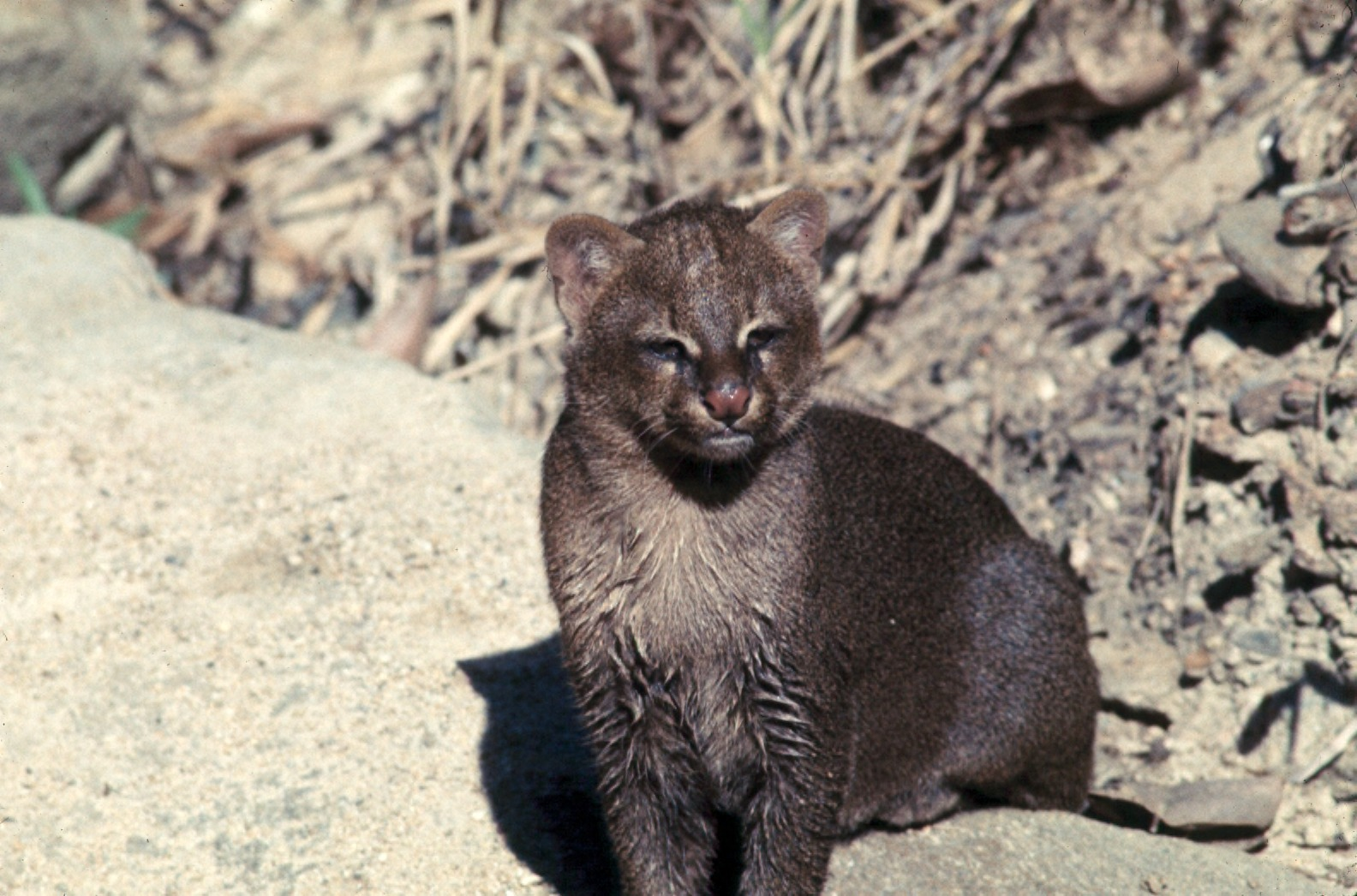
Jaguarundi (Felis yagouaroundi), a mammal species found in the park

The state park has a riparian area with a mixed forest of Montezuma bald cypress Taxodium mucronatum, Cottonwood Populus spp, Willow Salix spp and Mesquite Prosopis glandulosa. Dendrochronologists have dated the bald cypress population and found trees of over 1400 years of age. In fact, the indigenous name for this tree is Ahuehuetl meaning "old man in the water".

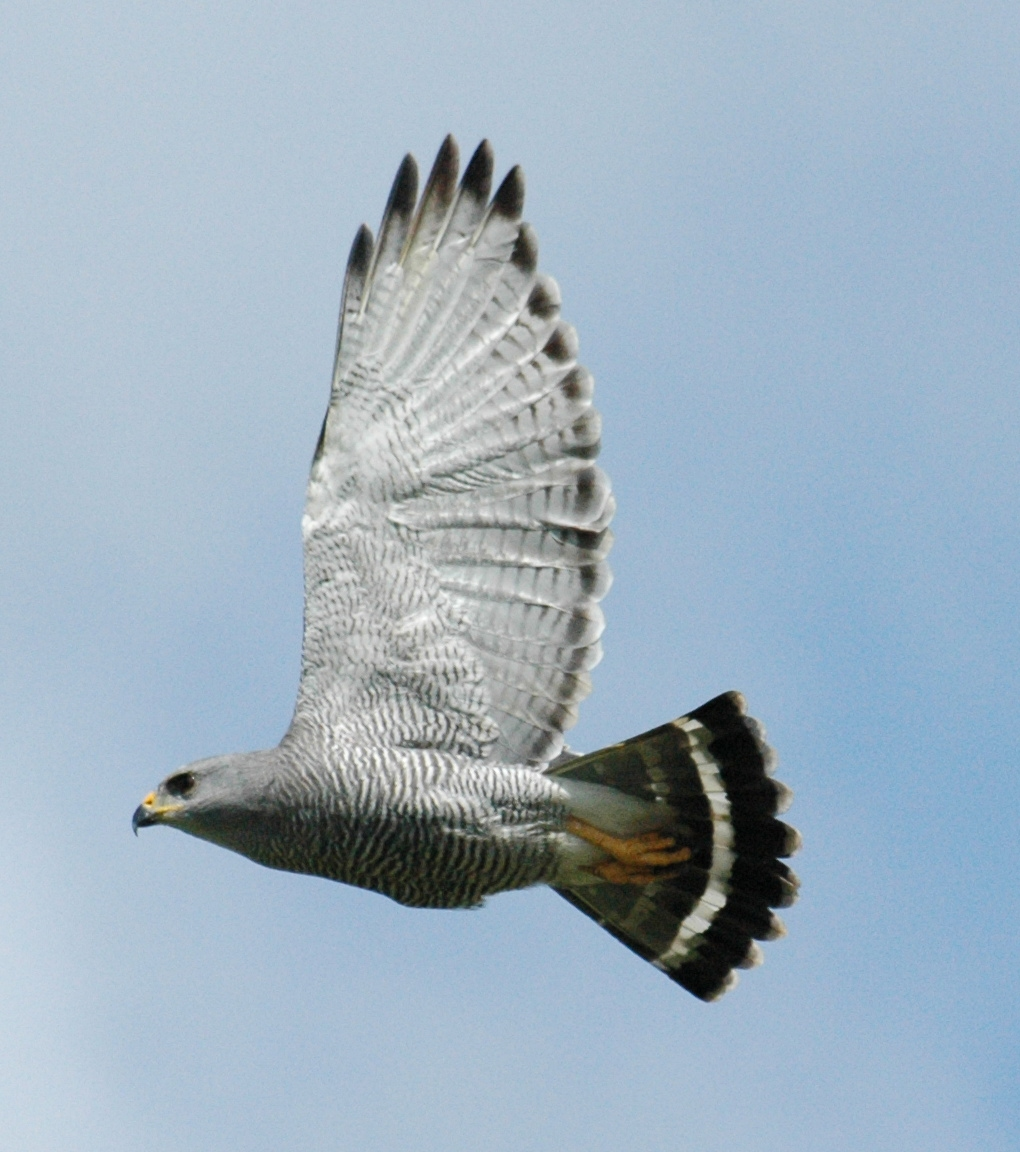
Gray hawk (Buteo plagiatus), a species which nests in the park

Avian diversity is high with over 220 bird species recorded in the park, including nesting rarities for the Chihuahuan Desert such as the grey hawk and the green jay. Reptiles and mammals are also quite diverse including bobcats, mountain lions and jaguarundis.

The area is managed by Prodefensa del Nazas, AC, an NGO based in nearby Gomez Palacio through a contract with the state government. The park faces several threats, such as the intended construction of a water treatment plant for the metro area of Lerdo Municipality, Gómez Palacio Municipality, Torreón Municipality and Matamoros Municipality, the depletion of the aquifer by overextraction for agriculture (mainly forage for dairy cows) and excessive use of fertilisers and pesticides.

The Cañon de Fernández State Park was listed as a "Wetland of International Importance" under the Ramsar Convention on February 2, 2008.
