= Otero Mesa =

Plateau in New Mexico and Texas, United States

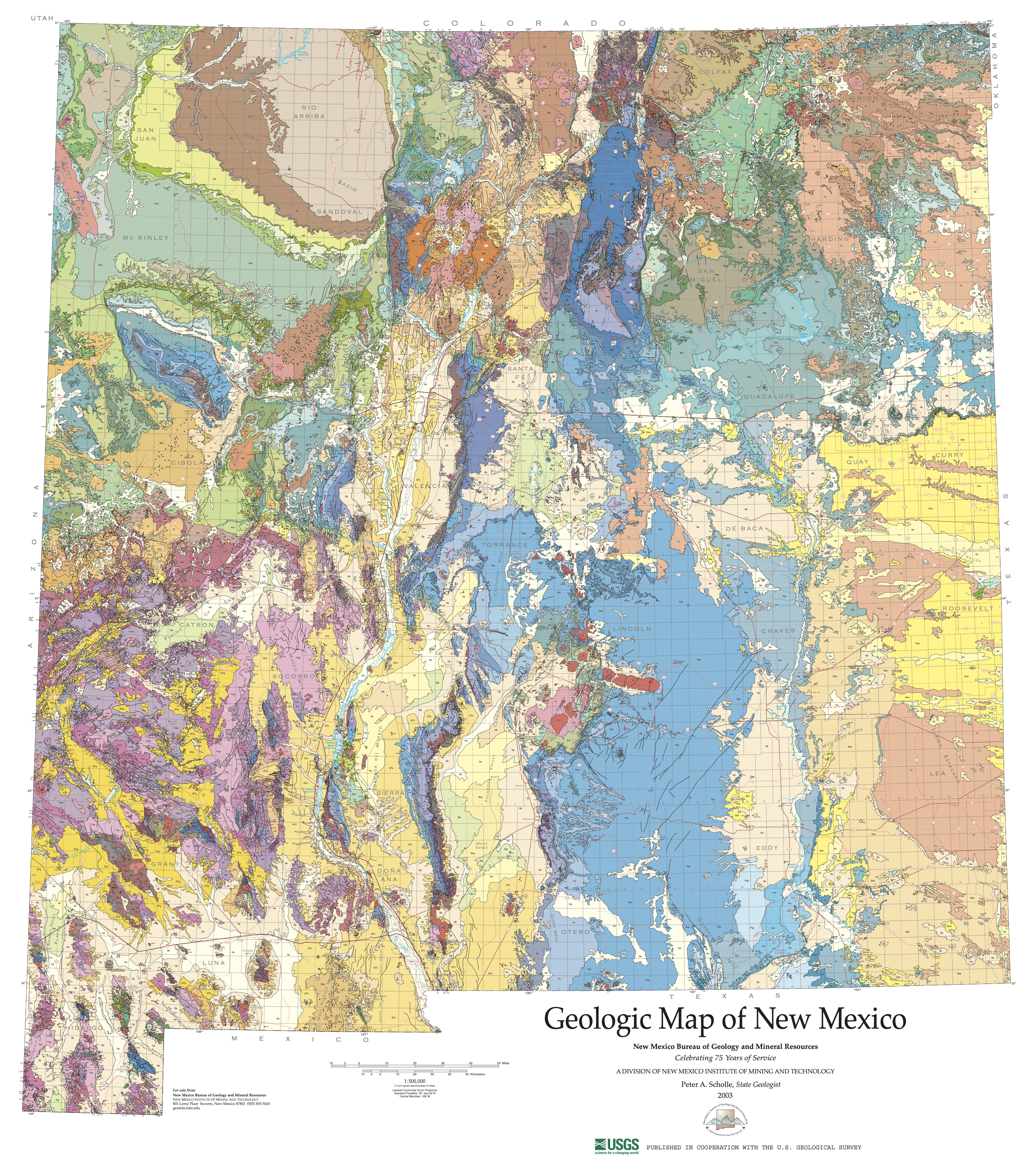

Otero Mesa is a plateau in the Trans-Pecos. The plateau extends north from Hudspeth County, Texas, into Otero County, New Mexico. Otero Mesa is the dominant landform in Hudspeth County, composing 70% of its land area. Otero Mesa has a more limited extant in Otero County. Overall, two-thirds of Otero Mesa is in Texas, but the colloquial usage of "Otero Mesa" is restricted to the component of the plateau in New Mexico. This is only a political distinction; Otero Mesa is physiographically continuous across the New Mexico – Texas state line.

In the center of Otero Mesa, the plateau is interrupted by the Cornudas Mountains, a cluster of buttes that jut almost 2,000 ft (610 m) above the plateau. The Cornudas Mountains include Wind Mountain, the highest point on Otero Mesa at 7,282 ft (2,220 m). The range is peppered with thousands of petroglyphs, complementing the well-known Hueco Tanks site farther west.

Otero Mesa is the northernmost part of the Chihuahuan Desert at its longitude. While the Chihuahuan Desert extends another 200 miles north along the Pecos and Rio Grande River Valleys, the high backslopes of the Sacramento, White, and Manzano Mountains between the basins are too mesic to support Chihuahuan Desert vegetative sites. These areas are instead classified as Southwestern Tablelands.

Grassland is the predominant landcover on Otero Mesa. These semi-arid grasslands are a remnant of a much larger network of Chihuahuan Desert steppes that carpeted uplands and bajadas 150 years ago. Overgrazing and fire suppression has degraded large swaths of this ecoregion into scrubland. Consequently, conservation organizations have recognized Otero Mesa as a significant ecosystem deserving protection.

In Texas, Otero Mesa is divided into private ranches. North of the state line, Otero Mesa is a patchwork of Bureau of Land Management, New Mexico State Land Office, and private lands. Livestock grazing is the primary land use here as well, but most of it is authorized under federal and state permits. Extensive federal ownership makes this area easier to protect; thus, for the sake of expediency, conservationists have defined "Otero Mesa" as the part of Otero Mesa in New Mexico.

McGregor Range, a U.S. Army installation, includes approximately 300,000 acres of withdrawn BLM land on Otero Mesa. Livestock grazing is allowed on most of this acreage, but a Fort Bliss Training Complex (FBTC) Recreational Access Permit is still required to visit the range when it is not in use.

== Ecology ==
Before the introduction of domesticated livestock in the late 19th century, virgin grassland carpeted Otero Mesa. It was far from homogeneous, however: differences in soil composition, climate, and surface runoff created a patchwork of unique plant communities, or ecological sites. Specifically,

"[a]n ecological site is defined as a distinctive kind of land with specific soil and physical characteristics that differ from other kinds of land in its ability to produce a distinctive kind and amount of vegetation and its ability to respond similarly to management actions and natural disturbances."

Scrublands on Otero Mesa are not considered unique ecological sites. Instead, they are classified as degraded states of other ecological sites whose historic climax plant communities (HCPCs) were grassland. Black grama, blue grama, tobosa, alkali sacaton, vine mesquite, bush muhly, and dropseeds were the dominant species in these HCPCs; the dominant species in non-riparian, degraded flatland ecological sites are now creosote bush and honey mesquite.

Otero Mesa ecological sites
Ecological site	Code	Historic climax plant community (HCPC) dominant species
Gravelly	R042XD007NM	Bush Muhly; Black Grama; Creosote Bush; Dropseed
Loamy	R042XB014NM	Bush Muhly; Black Grama; Creosote Bush; Dropseed
Loamy Sand	R042XD008NM	Black Grama
Loamy	R042XD001NM	Blue Grama; Tobosa
Deep Sand	R042XB011NM	Dropseeds; Black Grama; Bush Muhly
Draw	R042XB016NM	Tobosa; Alkali Sacaton; Vine Mesquite; Blue Grama
Limy	R042XB019NM	Black Grama
Limestone Hills	R042XB021NM	Black Grama; Tobosa
Gravelly	R042XC001NM	Black Grama
Shallow Sandy	R042XC002NM	Black Grama
Gyp Upland	R042XC006NM	Alkali Sacaton; Black Grama; Blue Grama; Burrograss; Tobosa; Gypsum (Chino) Grama; Gypsum Dropseed; Saltbush; Ephedra; Coldenia
Loamy	R042XC007NM	Tobosa; Black Grama; Blue Grama; Burrograss
Limestone Hills	R042XC020NM	Black Grama; Sideoats Grama; Curlyleaf Muhly
Sandhills	R042XC022NM	Sand Bluestem; Giant Dropseed; Spike Dropseed; Sand Dropseed; Mesa Dropseed
Limy	R042XC030NM	Black Grama; Blue Grama; Sand Dropseed; Threeawn
Clay Flat, Desert Grassland	R042XC241TX	Tobosa; Vine Mesquite; Grama
Igneous Hill and Mountain, Desert Grassland	R042XC247TX	Black Grama; Sideoats Grama; Cane Bluestem; Tanglehead
Limestone Hill and Mountain, Desert Grassland	R042XC249TX	Black Grama; Sideoats Grama; Cane Bluestem; Tanglehead
Sandstone Hill and Mountain, Desert Grassland	R042XC255TX	Black Grama; Sideoats Grama
Loamy Bottom	R042XD002NM	Alkali Sacaton
Draw	R042XD003NM	Sideoats Grama
Limy	R042XD004NM	Black Grama; Blue Grama
Clay Loam Upland	R042XD005NM	Alkali Sacaton; Blue Grama
Gravelly, Desert Grassland	R042XC244TX	Bush Muhly; Black Grama; Slim Tridens; Threeawn; Blue Grama
Shallow Sandy	R042XD006NM	Black Grama; Blue Grama
Limestone Hill, Dry Mixed Prairie	R042XD744TX	Black Grama; Blue Grama; Sideoats Grama; Curlyleaf Muhly
Limestone Hill and Mountain, Mixed Prairie	R042XE278TX	n/a

== Geography ==
The only major throughway on Otero Mesa is U.S. Route 180, which crosses the plateau to between El Paso and Guadalupe Mountains National Park. There are no towns on Otero Mesa. The western edge of Otero Mesa in New Mexico is defined by an abrupt escarpment. McGregor Range, a U.S. Army installation, extends from U.S. Route 54 over this escarpment and onto Otero Mesa proper. While access is restricted on McGregor Range, the public can use the Owen Prather Highway (New Mexico State Road 506) to cross it. This is the only way onto Otero Mesa from the west in New Mexico. NM-506 experiences temporarily closures during some military exercises.

Otero Mesa slopes gently eastward into Crow Flats and Salt Flats. These two playas drain most of the plateau. The western edge of Otero Mesa is an escarpment continuous with the Sacramento Mountains. In the vicinity of El Paso, Hueco Mountains separate Otero Mesa from the Rio Grande Valley. Until Van Horn, the border of Otero Mesa is a series of steep escarpments and bajadas. At its southwest corner, Otero Mesa dramatically rises to form the Sierra Diablo, which tower over Salt Flats. Otero Mesa fades into the lowlands for 40 miles before it reaches the tablelands of the southern Sacramento Mountains.

Cornudas Mountains & Sierra Tinaja Pinta elevations
Peak	Elevation
Deer Mountain	5,791 ft (1,765 m)
Flat Top	6,135 ft (1,870 m)
Alamo Mountain	6,679 ft (2,036 m)
Cornudas Mountain	5,724 ft (1,745 m)
Wind Mountain	7,282 ft (2,220 m)
Black Mountain	5,350 ft (1,630 m)
San Antonio Mountain	7,010 ft (2,140 m)
Washburn Mountain	5,689 ft (1,734 m)
Chatfield Mountain	6,364 ft (1,940 m)
Dog Mountain	5,731 ft (1,747 m)
Sierra Tinaja Pinta (1)	5,683 ft (1,732 m)
Sierra Tinaja Pinta (2)	5,665 ft (1,727 m)
Cerro Diablo	5,709 ft (1,740 m)

== Geology ==
Otero Mesa is the southern extension of the eastward-dipping Sacramento Mountains fault block. The extension of the Rio Grande rift has gradually uplifted the fault block over the last 25 million years. Several exposed sedimentary formations compose the bedrock of the Mesa. From west to east, these are the Hueco Formation, Yeso Group, and San Andres Formation. This is also the relative chronology of the formations, from oldest to youngest. All are Permian marine carbonate sequences deposited during the Cisuralian epoch.

=== Sacramento Mountains Bajada ===
In contrast to their abrupt western escarpment, the southern margin of the Sacramento Mountains is a gently sloping bajada. The bajada is formed by three alluvial fans emerging from the mouths of Wildcat Canyon, El Paso Canyon, and the Sacramento River Canyon. The superficial alluvium of the bajada was deposited between 126,000 kya and the present day.

Along with the outflow of Piñon Creek onto Crow Flats, the Sacramento Mountains Bajada is the primary groundwater recharge zone in the Salt Basin.

=== Cornudas Mountains ===
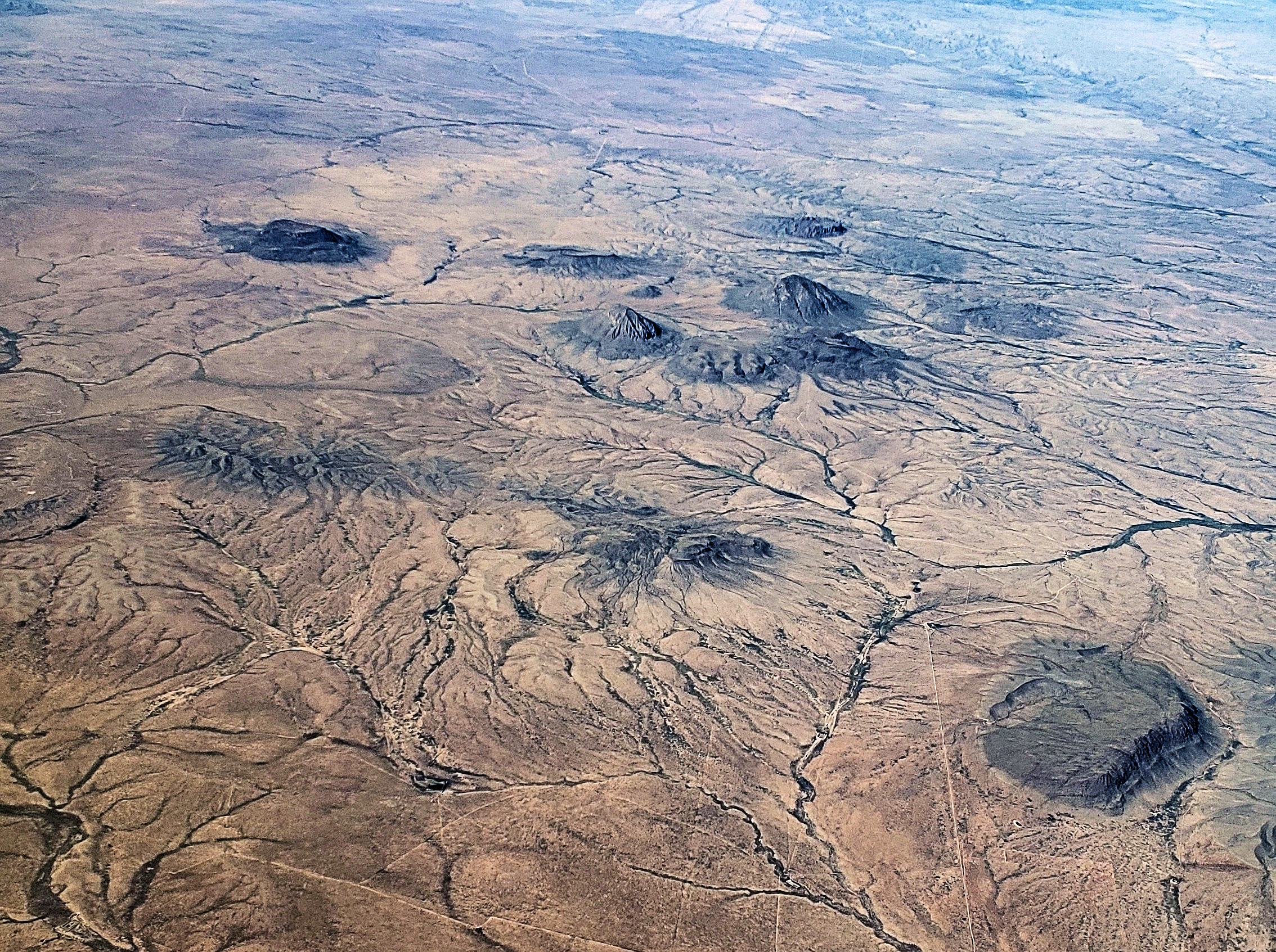
Aerial view of Cornudas Mountains looking north

The Cornudas Mountains are field of igneous intrusions on the New Mexico-Texas state line. Rising dramatically from the plains of Otero Mesa, these plutons "represent the northern extent of the Trans-Pecos magmatic province."

The igneous intrusions that compose the Cornudas Mountains were emplaced between 37.4 mya to 31.6 mya. This corresponds to the end of the Laramide Orogeny and the "progressive shallowing of the subduction of the Farallon plate beneath the North American plate." In the succeeding time, the plutons were exhumed by erosion, being more resistant to weathering than the surrounding sedimentary rock.

==== Lithology ====
In the Cornudas Mountains, "the predominant lithology is porphyritic nepheline syenite," though other alkalic rocks, including "nepheline-bearing augite syenite,...nepheline-bearing trachyte,...syenite,...nepheline syenite,...phonolite,... foliated porphyritic nepheline syenite,...quartz-bearing syenite,...quartz-bearing trachyte" and nepheline-bearing augite syenite are present.

==== Mining ====
"The Cornudas Mountains have been examined for potential economic deposits of gold, silver, beryllium, rare-earth elements, niobium,...uranium, [and nepheline,] but no production has occurred."

==== Minerals ====
===== Windmountainite =====
Wind Mountain is the type locality of windmountainite, a novel mineral there discovered in a phonolite dike. Windmountainite was formally described in 2020.

===== Georgechaoite =====
Wind Mountain is the type locality of georgechaoite, where it occurs in miarolitic cavities in nepheline syenite. Georgechaoite was formally described in 1985.

=== Brokeoff Mountains ===
The Brokeoff Mountains are a series of southeast-dipping fault blocks that form a disjunct the Guadalupe Mountains. Three major formations are exposed in the Brokeoff Mountains: the Yeso, San Andres, and Grayburg formations (listed from oldest to youngest). All are composed of Cisuralian marine deposits.

The rugged terrain of the Brokeoffs and southern Guadalupe Mountains escarpment form a distinct, northward-opening "V." Big Dog, Upper Dog, and Middle Dog Canyons lead to the apex of the V, the uplands of Guadalupe Mountains National Park.

== Description ==
Otero Mesa is a 1.2 million acre (4,900 km^{2}) area in northern Chihuahuan Desert region of southern New Mexico. Between 1954 and 1965 the U.S. Army expanded its McGregor Range facilities at Fort Bliss onto Otero Mesa by purchasing ranches. In 2005, the Bureau of Land Management approved the area for exploratory drilling for oil and gas, but that approval is currently being litigated by the state of New Mexico and environmental groups who want the mesa to be recognized as protected wilderness.

On Tuesday, April 28, 2009, the Court of Appeals for the Tenth Circuit ruled against the US Bureau of Land Management plan for leasing the Otero Mesa for oil and gas extraction. The court found that the BLM had failed to consider an alternative that would leave the Otero Mesa unleased, and also failed to examine potential impacts to the underlying groundwater. The oil company HEYCO had been granted a lease for extracting natural gas form Otero Mesa, pending the outcome of the litigation.
