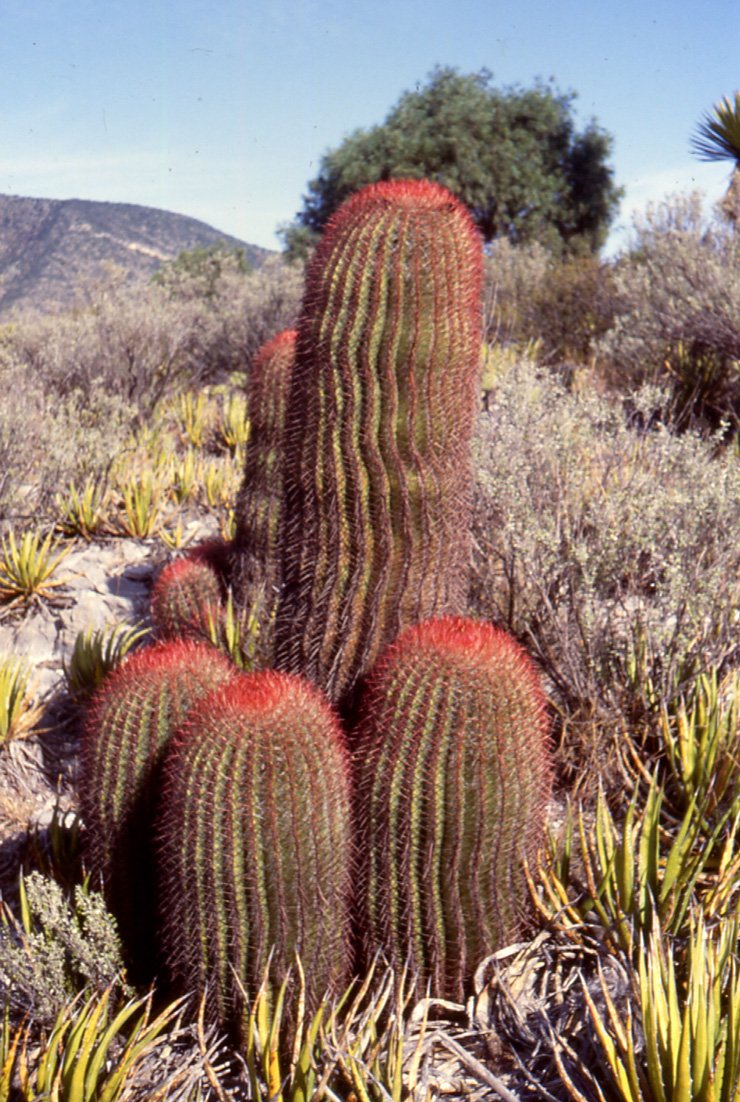

Conservation status
- Least Concern (IUCN 3.1)

Scientific classification
- Kingdom: Plantae
- Clade: Tracheophytes
- Clade: Angiosperms
- Clade: Eudicots
- Order: Caryophyllales
- Family: Cactaceae
- Subfamily: Cactoideae
- Genus: Ferocactus
- Species: F. pilosus

Binomial name
- Ferocactus pilosus (Galeotti ex Salm-Dyck) Werdermann

Synonyms
- Echinocactus pilosus Galeotti ex Salm-Dyck 1850; Ferocactus stainesii var. pilosus (Galeotti ex Salm-Dyck) Backeb. 1961; Echinocactus pilifer Lem. 1843; Echinocactus pilosus var. flavispinus Schelle 1926; Echinocactus pilosus var. pringlei J.M.Coult. 1896; Echinocactus pilosus f. stainesii (Salm-Dyck) Voss 1894; Echinocactus pilosus var. stainesii Salm-Dyck 1850; Echinocactus pringlei (J.M.Coult.) Rose 1906; Echinocactus stainesii Hook. ex Salm-Dyck 1850; Ferocactus pilifer (Lem.) G.Unger 1986; Ferocactus pilifer f. flavispinus (Schelle) G.Unger 1986; Ferocactus pilifer var. stainesii (Salm-Dyck) G.Unger 1986; Ferocactus pringlei (J.M.Coult.) Britton & Rose (1922; Ferocactus stainesii (Hook. ex Salm-Dyck) Britton & Rose 1922; Ferocactus stainesii var. pringlei (J.M.Coult.) Backeb. 1961

= Ferocactus pilosus =

Species of cactus

Ferocactus pilosus, also known as Mexican lime cactus (Biznaga De Lima) or Mexican fire barrel, is a species of cactus in North America.

== Description ==
Ferocactus pilosus grows singly or forms large clumps, reaching heights up to 3 meters with diameters of 50 cm (20 in). It has 13 to 20 non-humped ribs, initially sharp-edged in young plants and later becoming rounded. The areoles are close together, giving the appearance of almost merging into one another. The bright red or yellow, spreading spines are pubescent and slightly curved, making it difficult to distinguish between central and radial spines. The mostly red, six to 12 central spines are strong, reaching up to 5 cm (2.0 in) in length, while the radial spines are typically reduced to numerous, whitish bristles.

The yellow to red flowers appear in circles around the shoot tip, measuring up to 4 cm (1.6 in) in length and 2.5 cm (0.98 in) in diameter. The yellow fruits are egg-shaped, about 3 to 4 cm (1.2 to 1.6 in) long.

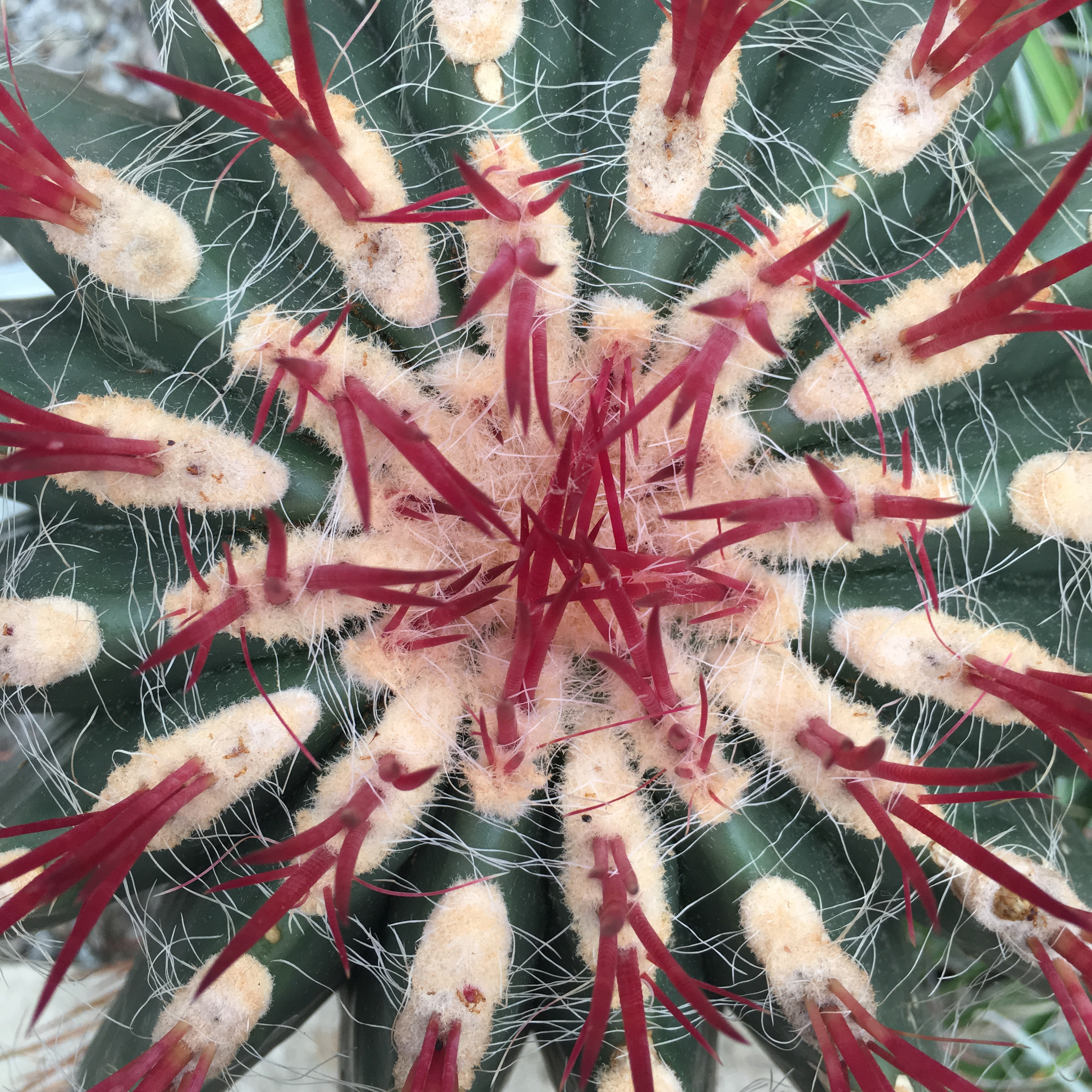
Ferocactus pilosus (detail of growing point)

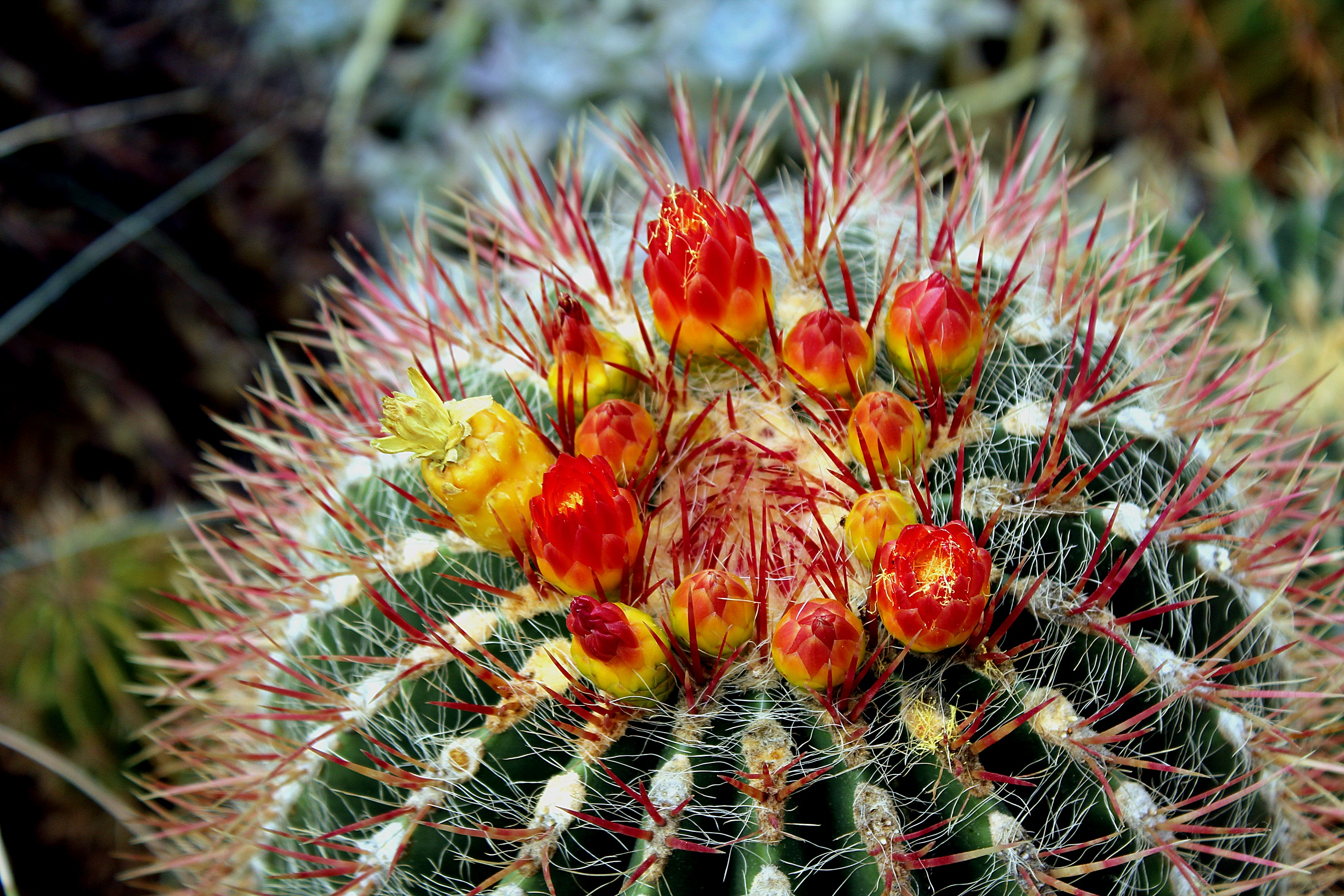
Flower buds

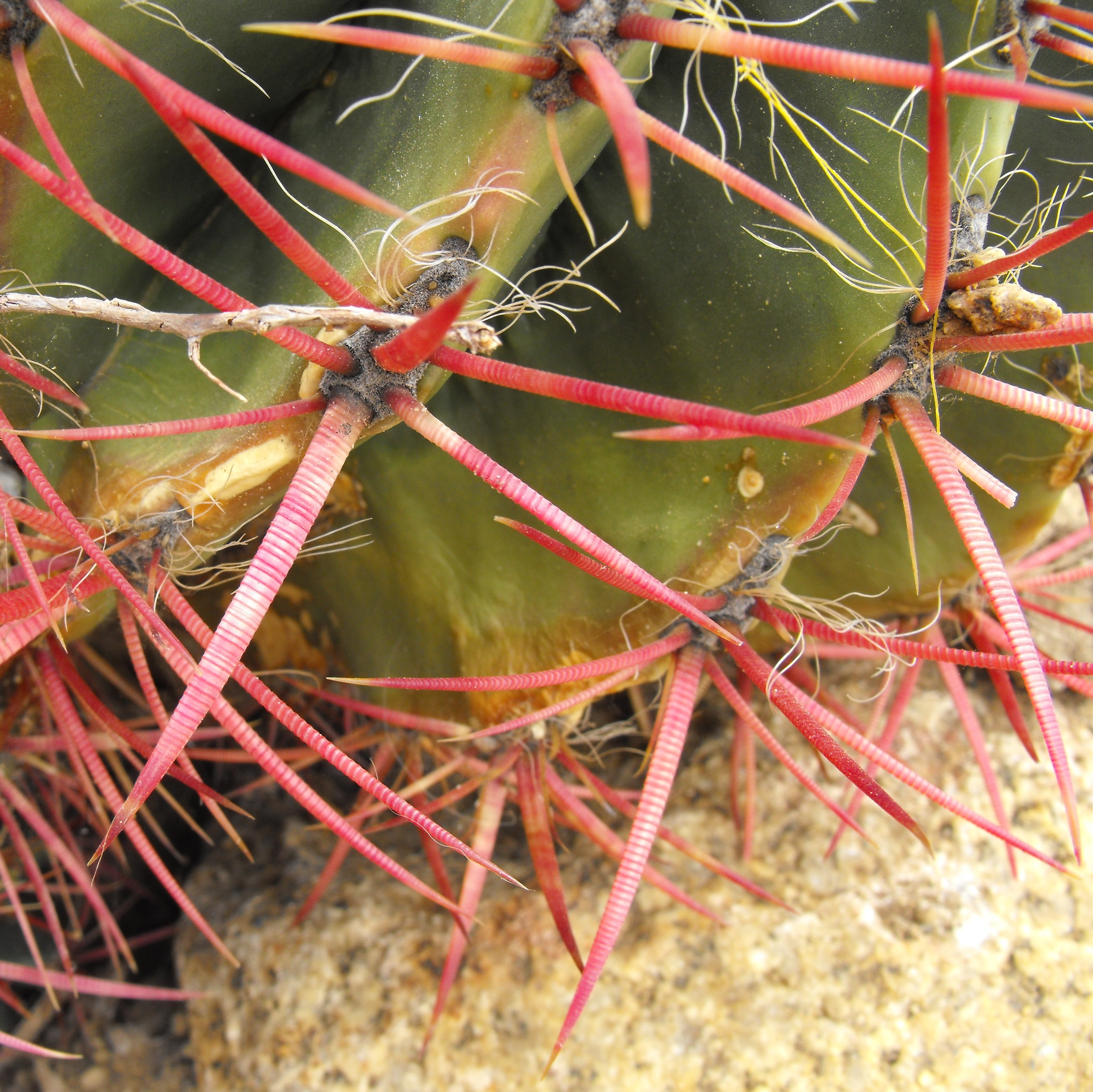
Spines

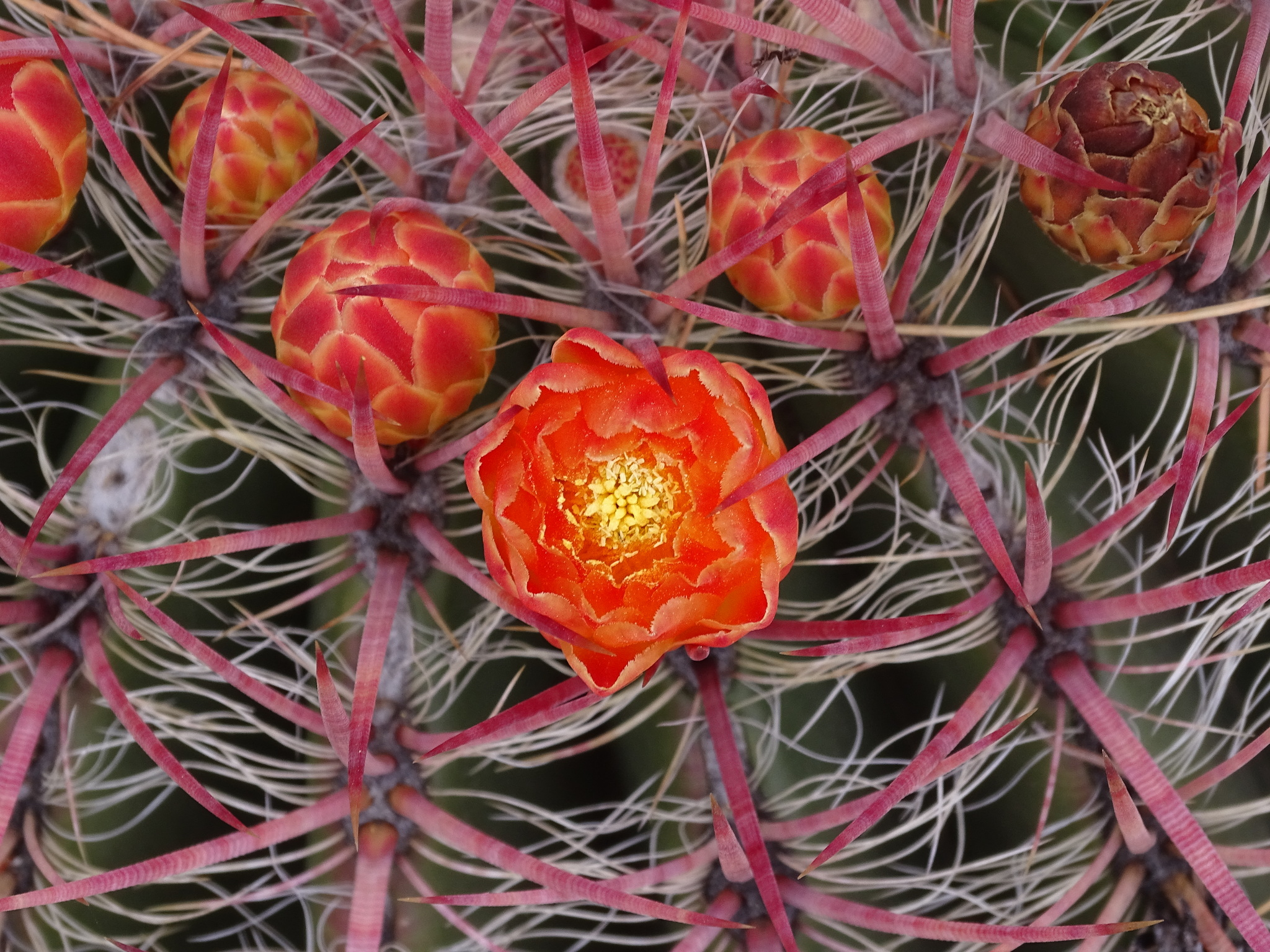
Flowers

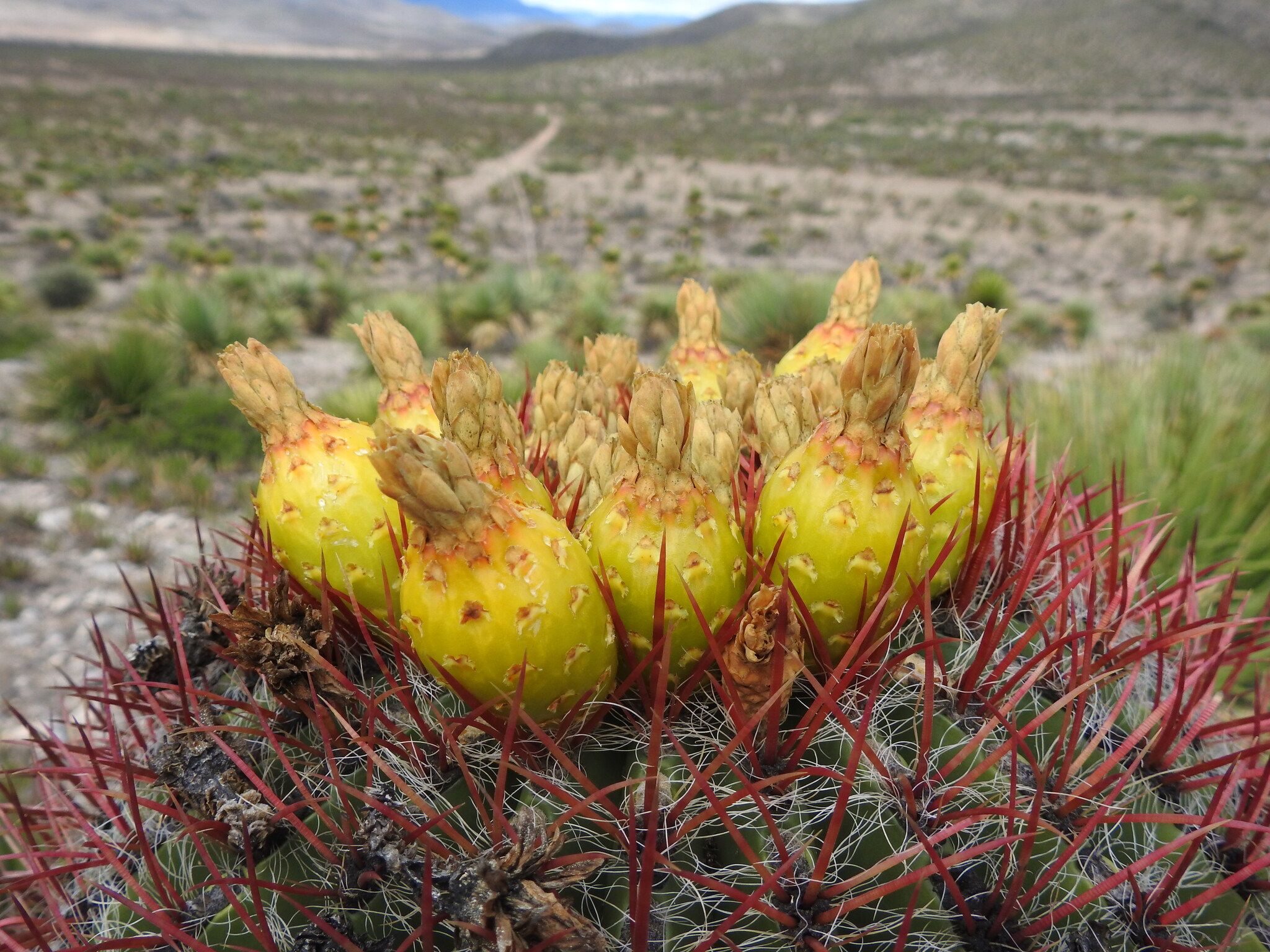
Fruits

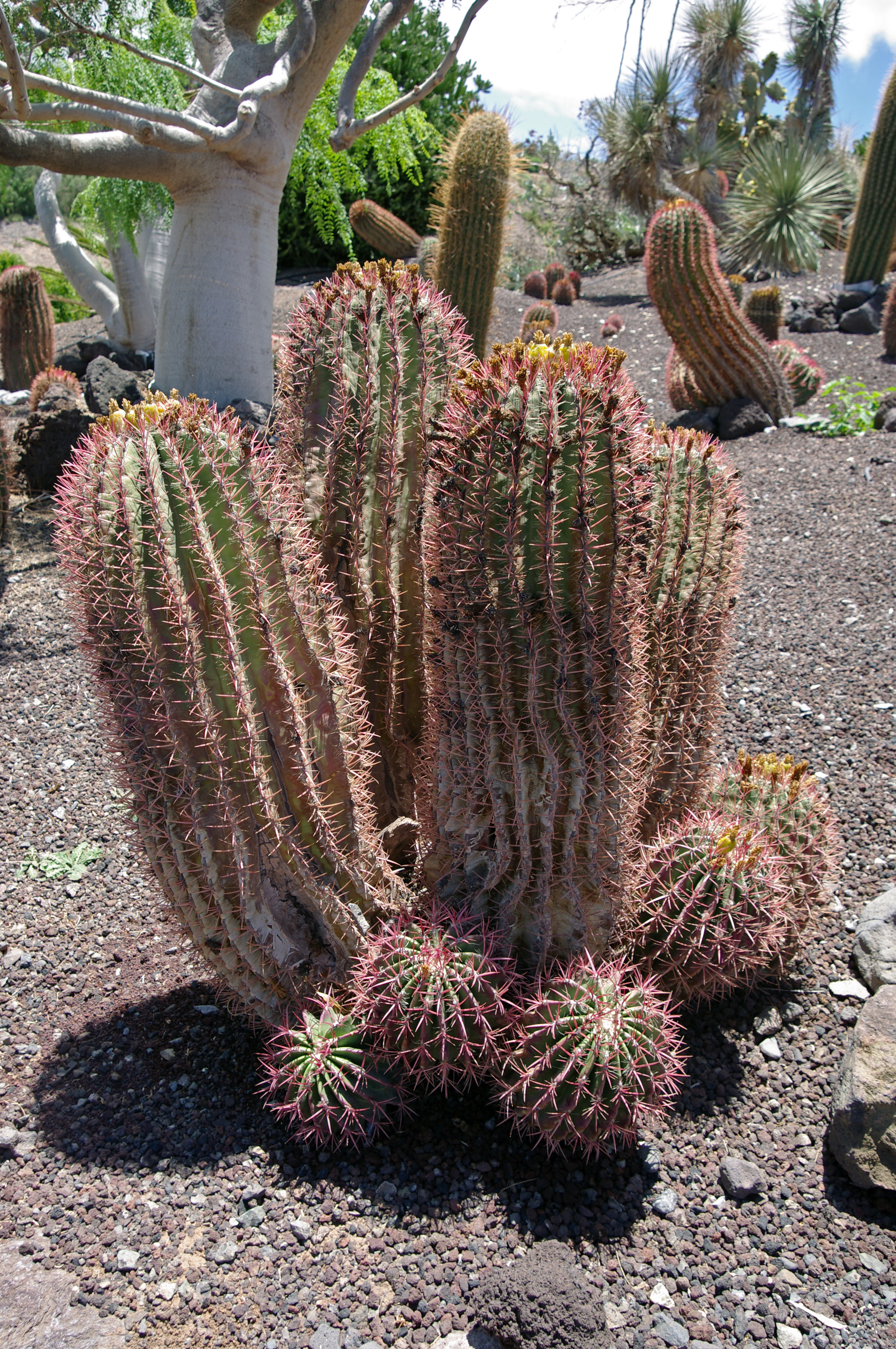
Plant growing in Oasis Park Fuerteventura

== Distribution ==
The cactus is endemic to the Chihuahuan Desert, located in northeastern Mexico.

It is native to the Mexican states of Coahuila, Durango, Nuevo Leon, San Luis Potosí, and Tamaulipas, found growing on rocky limestone slopes.

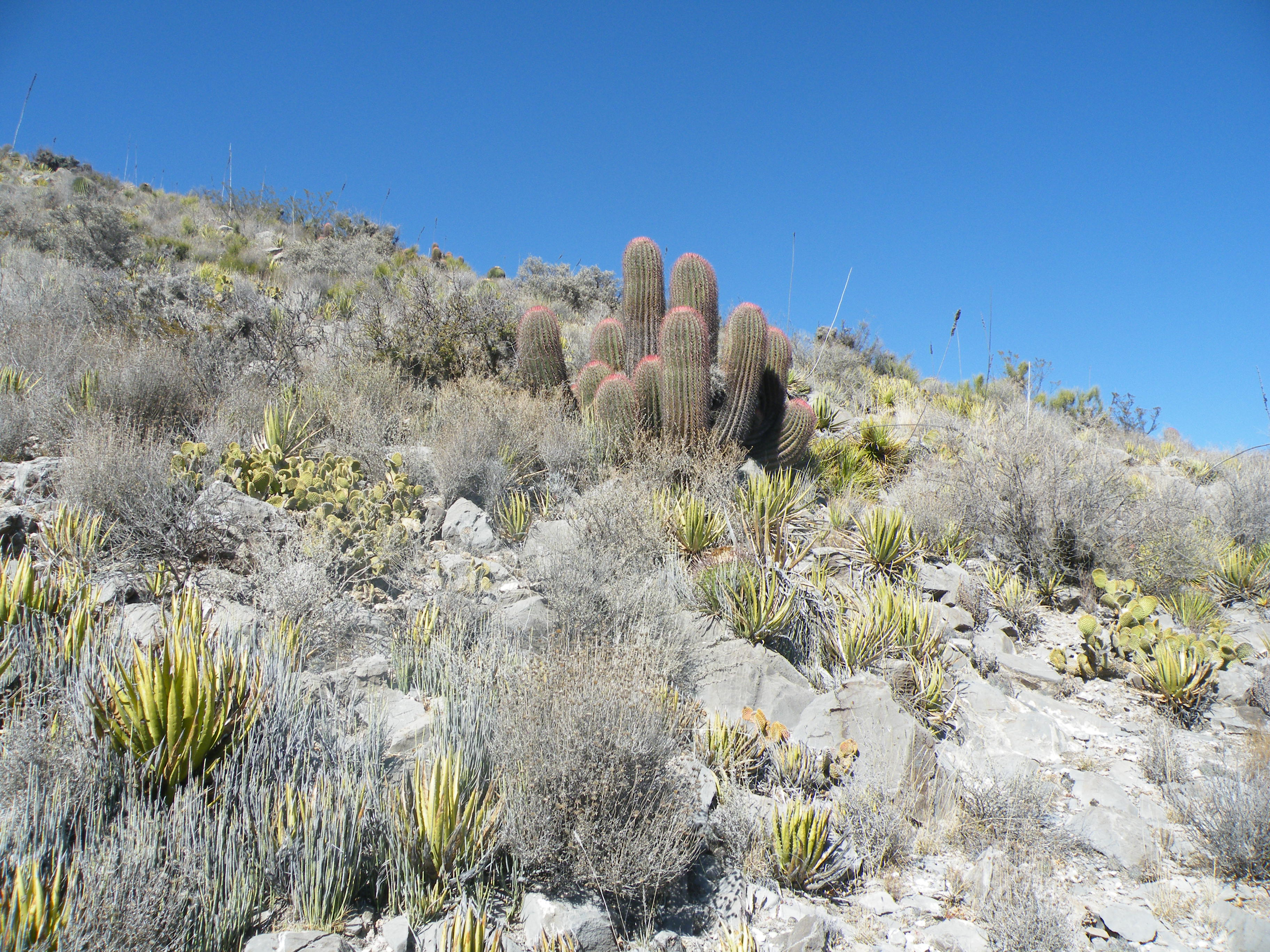
Habitat near Ranch San Rafael, Nuevo Leon

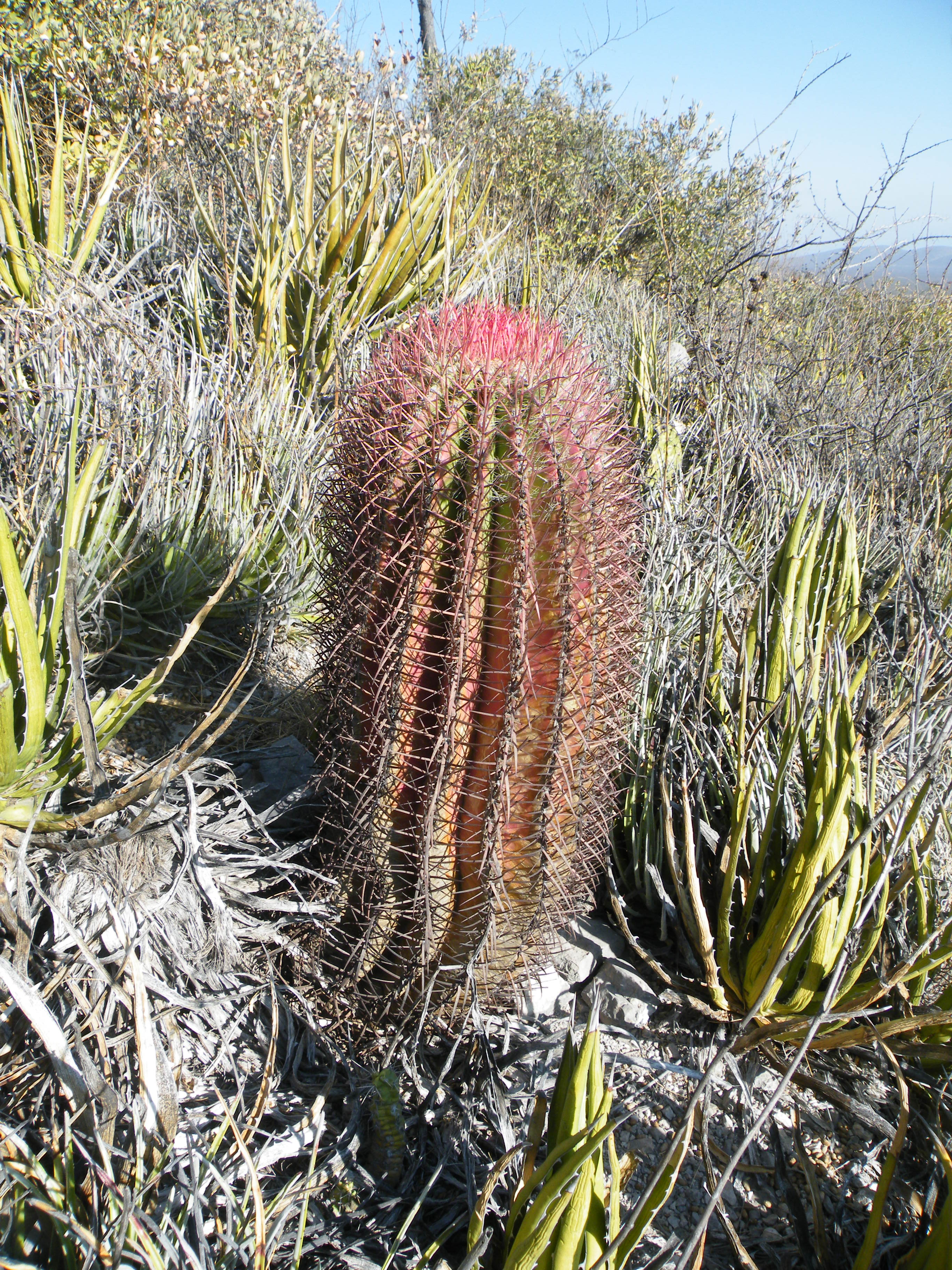
Plant growing in Luis Potosi

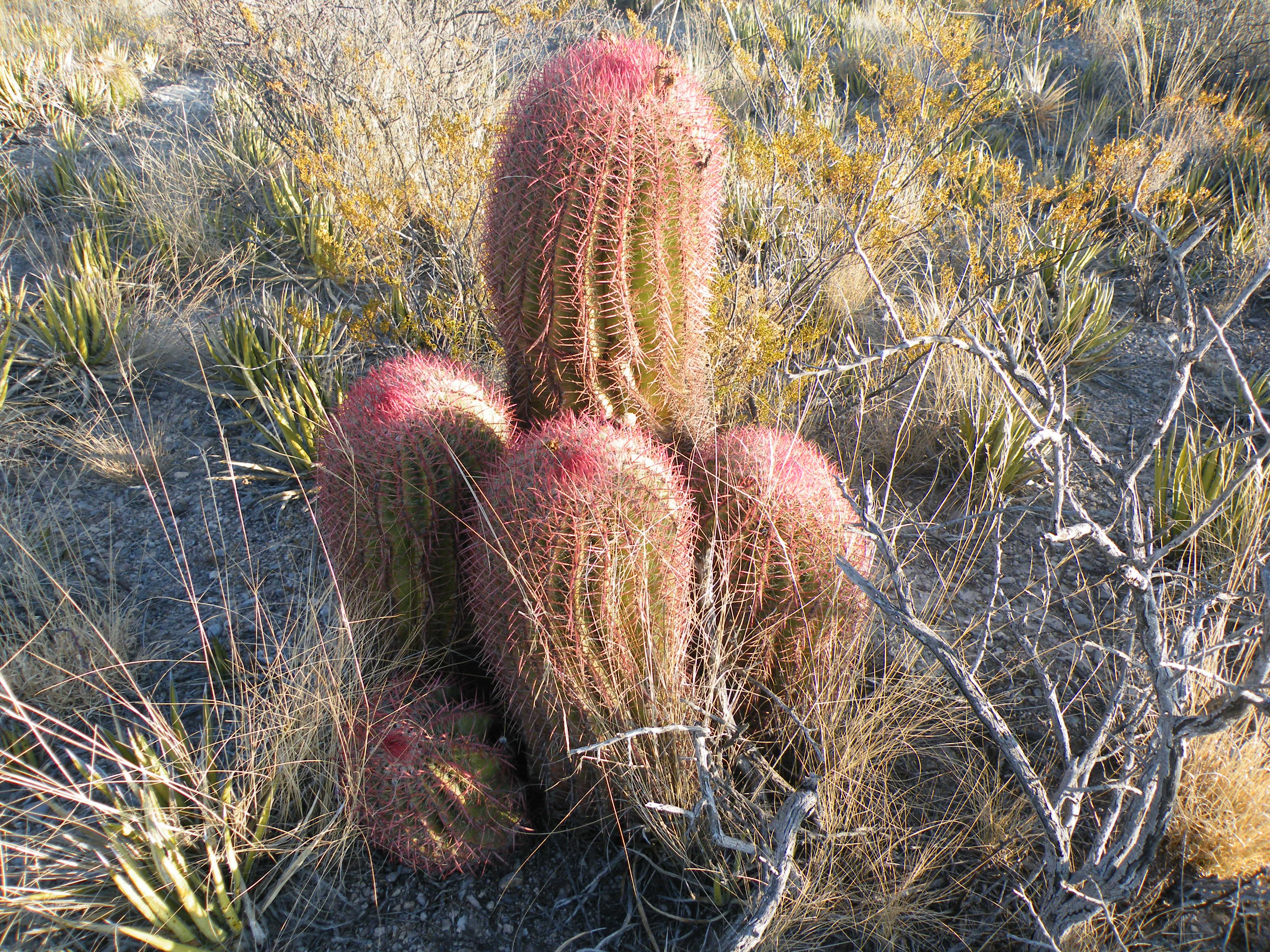
Plants in habitat in Concepcion del Oro, Zacatecas

== Taxonomy ==
First described as Echinocactus pilosus in 1850 by Henri Guillaume Galeotti in Joseph zu Salm-Reifferscheidt-Dyck's Cacteae in horto Dyckensi cultae anno 1849, the specific epithet pilosus, meaning 'hairy' in Latin, refers to the species' thorns. Erich Werdermann transferred the species to the genus Ferocactus in 1933.
