= Helietta glaucescens =

Conservation status
- Endangered (IUCN 2.3)

Scientific classification
- Kingdom: Plantae
- Clade: Tracheophytes
- Clade: Angiosperms
- Clade: Eudicots
- Clade: Rosids
- Order: Sapindales
- Family: Rutaceae
- Genus: Helietta
- Species: H. glaucescens

Binomial name
- Helietta glaucescens Urb.

Synonyms
- Helietta cubensis Monach. & Moldenke

Species of flowering plant

Helietta glaucescens is a species of flowering plant in the family Rutaceae. It is a tree endemic to Cuba. It is native to the northern Sierra Maestra range in Santiago de Cuba Province, where it grows in humid tropical forest on karstic block mountains and limestone cliffs.

The species was described by Ignatz Urban in 1924.
