= Helietta =

Scientific classification
- Kingdom: Plantae
- Clade: Tracheophytes
- Clade: Angiosperms
- Clade: Eudicots
- Clade: Rosids
- Order: Sapindales
- Family: Rutaceae
- Subfamily: Zanthoxyloideae
- Genus: Helietta; Tul.

Species
- 10; see text

Genus of flowering plants

Helietta is a genus of flowering plants in the citrus family, Rutaceae. Members of the genus are commonly known as barettas, barretas, or barrettas. It includes ten species native to the tropical and subtropical Americas, ranging from southern Texas to Mexico, Cuba, northwestern South America, and Brazil and Bolivia to northeastern Argentina. The generic name honors French physician Louis Théodore Hélie (1802–1867).

== Species ==
Ten species are accepted.

- Helietta apiculata Benth.
- Helietta glaucescens Urb. – Cuba
- Helietta glaziovii (Engl.) Pirani
- Helietta hirsuta H.Cuadros
- Helietta lottiae F.Chiang
- Helietta lucida Brandegee
- Helietta magna Londoño-Ech., A.M.Trujillo, Pirani & Pérez-Zab.
- Helietta parvifolia (A.Gray ex Hemsl.) Benth. – Mexico and the Lower Rio Grande Valley of Texas
- Helietta plaeana Tul.
- Helietta puberula R.E.Fr.
