= Helietta parvifolia =

Conservation status
- Least Concern (IUCN 3.1)

Scientific classification
- Kingdom: Plantae
- Clade: Tracheophytes
- Clade: Angiosperms
- Clade: Eudicots
- Clade: Rosids
- Order: Sapindales
- Family: Rutaceae
- Genus: Helietta
- Species: H. parvifolia

Binomial name
- Helietta parvifolia (A.Gray ex Hemsl.) Benth.

Species of plant

Helietta parvifolia, common name barreta, is a species of flowering plant in the family Rutaceae. It is native to southern Texas and northeastern Mexico in the states of Coahuila, Nuevo León, Tamaulipas, San Luis Potosí, Guanajuato, Querétaro, and Hidalgo. It is a shrub reaching 6 m (20 ft) and a member of the Tamaulipan thornscrub community.
