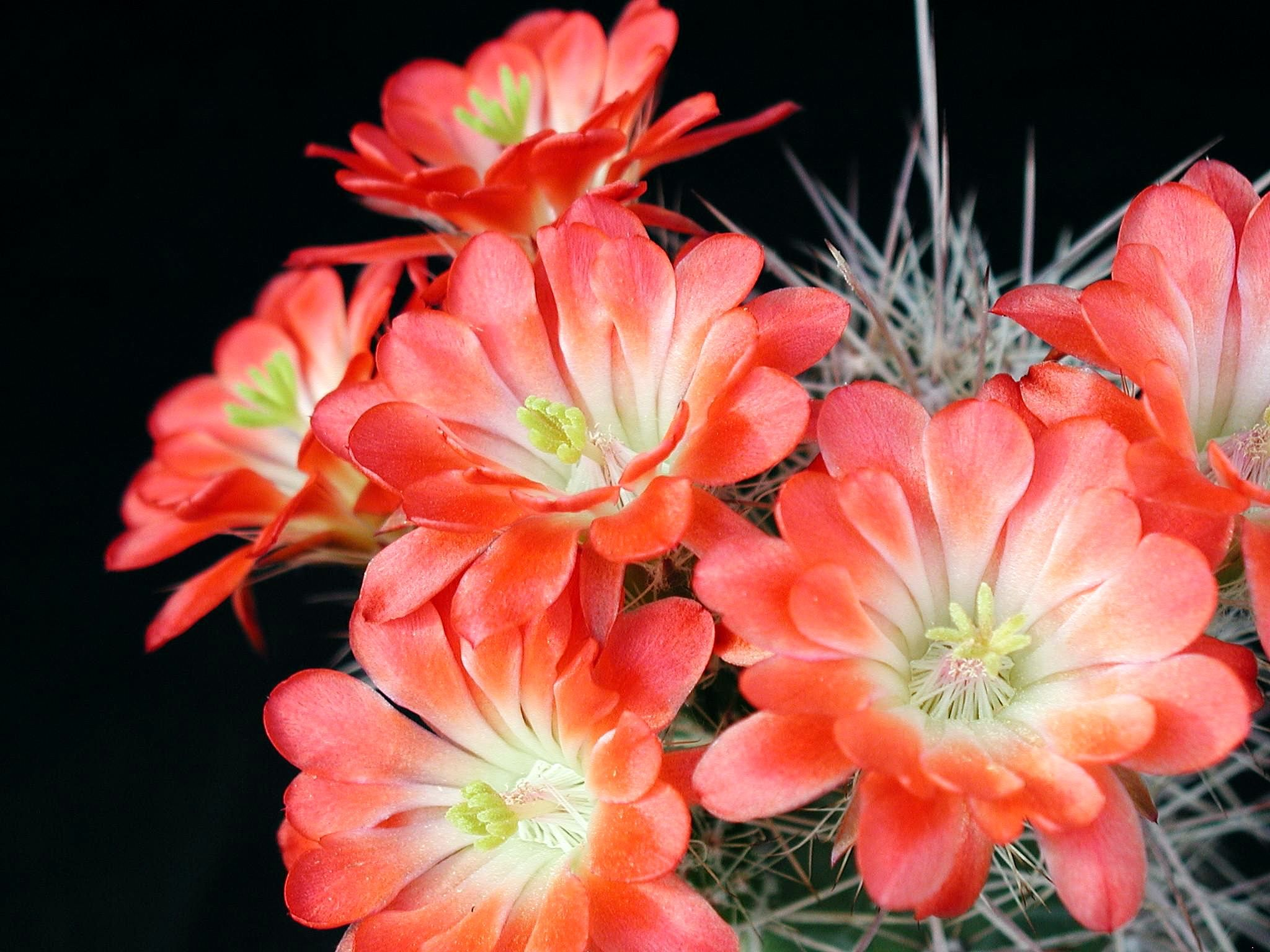

Conservation status
- Least Concern (IUCN 3.1)

Scientific classification
- Kingdom: Plantae
- Clade: Tracheophytes
- Clade: Angiosperms
- Clade: Eudicots
- Order: Caryophyllales
- Family: Cactaceae
- Subfamily: Cactoideae
- Genus: Echinocereus
- Species: E. polyacanthus

Binomial name
- Echinocereus polyacanthus Engelm. 1848

Synonyms
- Echinocereus triglochidiatus var. polyacanthus (Engelm.) L.D.Benson 1944; Echinocereus triglochidiatus subsp. polyacanthus (Engelm.) U.Guzmán 2003; Cereus leeanus Hook. 1849; Cereus pacificus J.M.Coult. 1896; Cereus pleiogonus Labour. 1853; Cereus polyacanthus Engelm. 1849; Echinocereus durangensis Rümpler 1885; Echinocereus durangensis var. nigrispinus Rümpler 1885; Echinocereus durangensis var. rufispinus Rümpler 1885; Echinocereus leeanus (Hook.) Lem. ex Rümpler 1885; Echinocereus leeanus var. multicostatus (Cels) K.Schum. 1898; Echinocereus multicostatus Cels 1885; Echinocereus pleiogonus (Labour.) Croucher 1878; Echinocereus triglochidiatus var. multicostatus (Cels) W.T.Marshall 1953

= Echinocereus polyacanthus =

Species of cactus

Echinocereus polyacanthus is a species of cactus native to Mexico.

== Description ==
Echinocereus polyacanthus grows solitary or in clusters, often forming groups or cushions with up to 400 shoots. The bright to dark green cylindrical shoots taper at both the base and tip, measuring 10 to 30 centimeters in length and 2 to 7.5 cm (0.79 to 2.95 in) in diameter. They feature nine to 13 smooth or tuberous ribs. Each plant has one to seven brown or yellow-brown central spines, thickened at the base, and up to 5 cm (2.0 in) long, though their length varies. Additionally, there are six to 14 overlapping, dirty white radial spines, each up to 2 cm (0.79 in) long.

The flowers are tubular to funnel-shaped, ranging from bright pinkish-orange to deep red, with a yellowish or whitish throat. They appear near the shoot tips, measuring 3 to 14 cm (1.2 to 5.5 in) in length and 2 to 8 cm (0.79 to 3.15 in) in diameter. The green, egg-shaped fruits contain white flesh and do not tear.

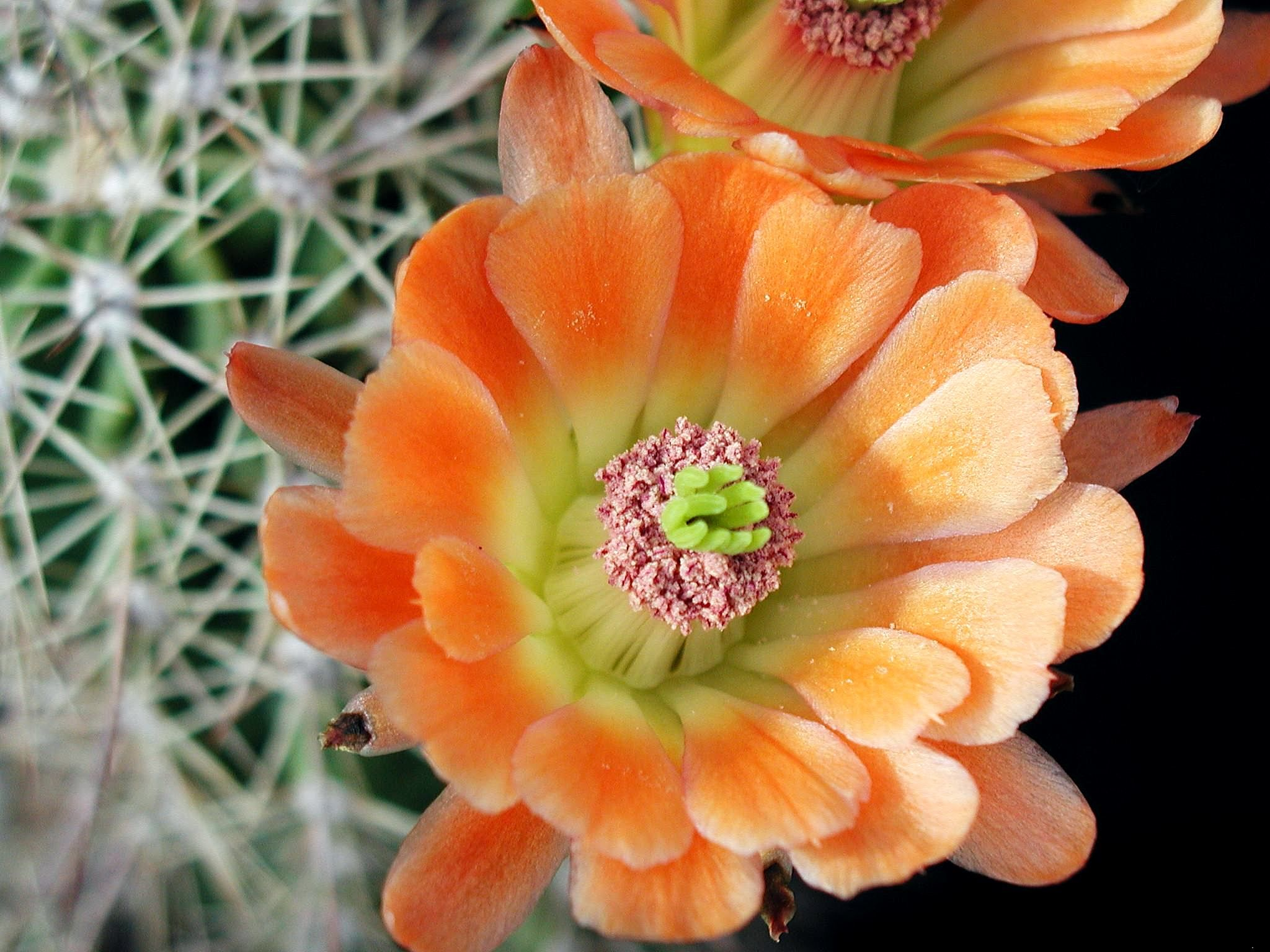
Flower

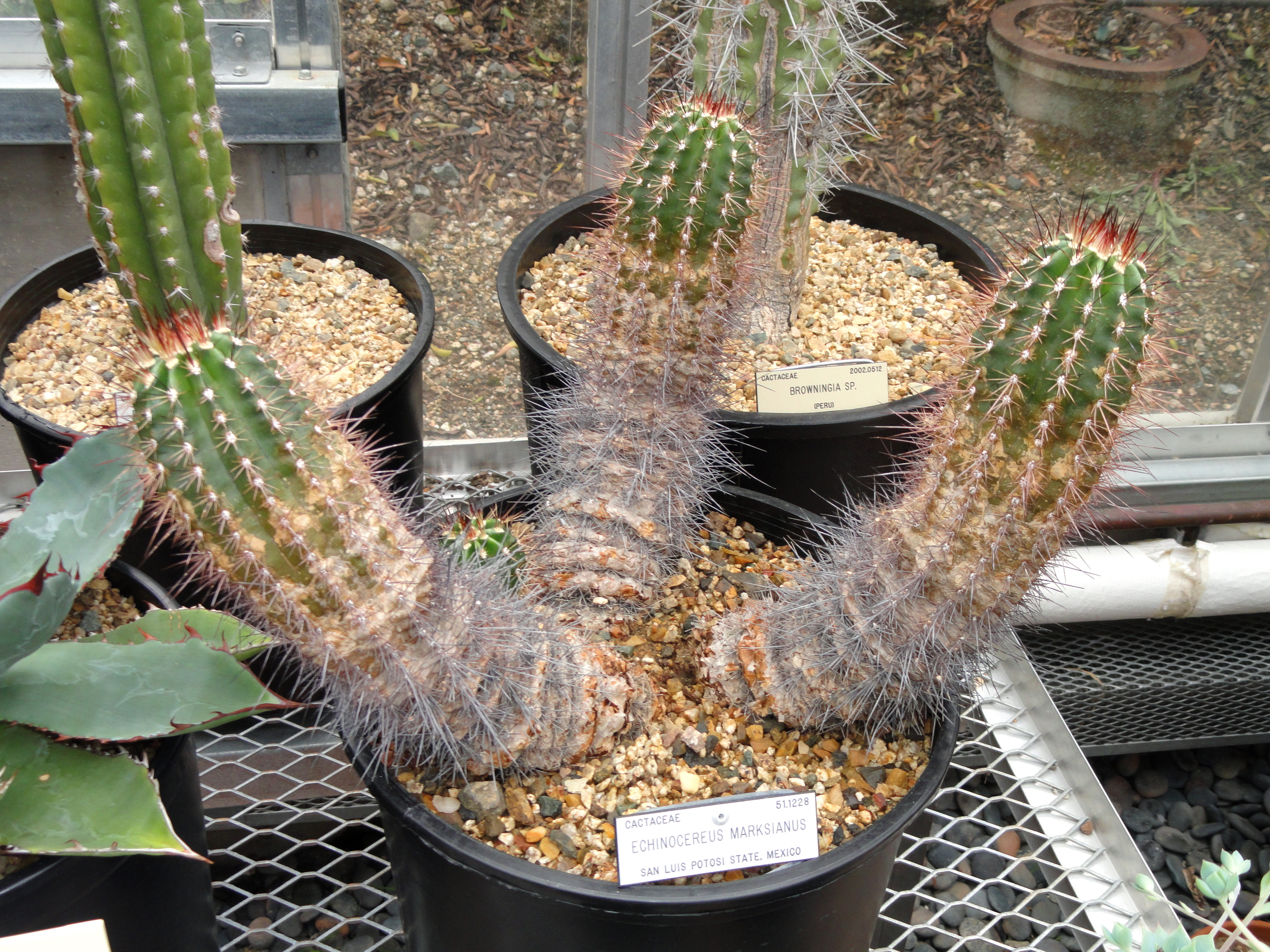
Plant

== Distribution ==
Echinocereus polyacanthus is found in Arizona and New Mexico in the United States, extending Chihuaua, Durango, Cosihuiriachi, Sierra Madre Occidental in eastern Sonora Mexico, and Baja California peninsula in Mexico growing on rocky outcrops between 1,300 and 2,000 m (4,300 and 6,600 ft).

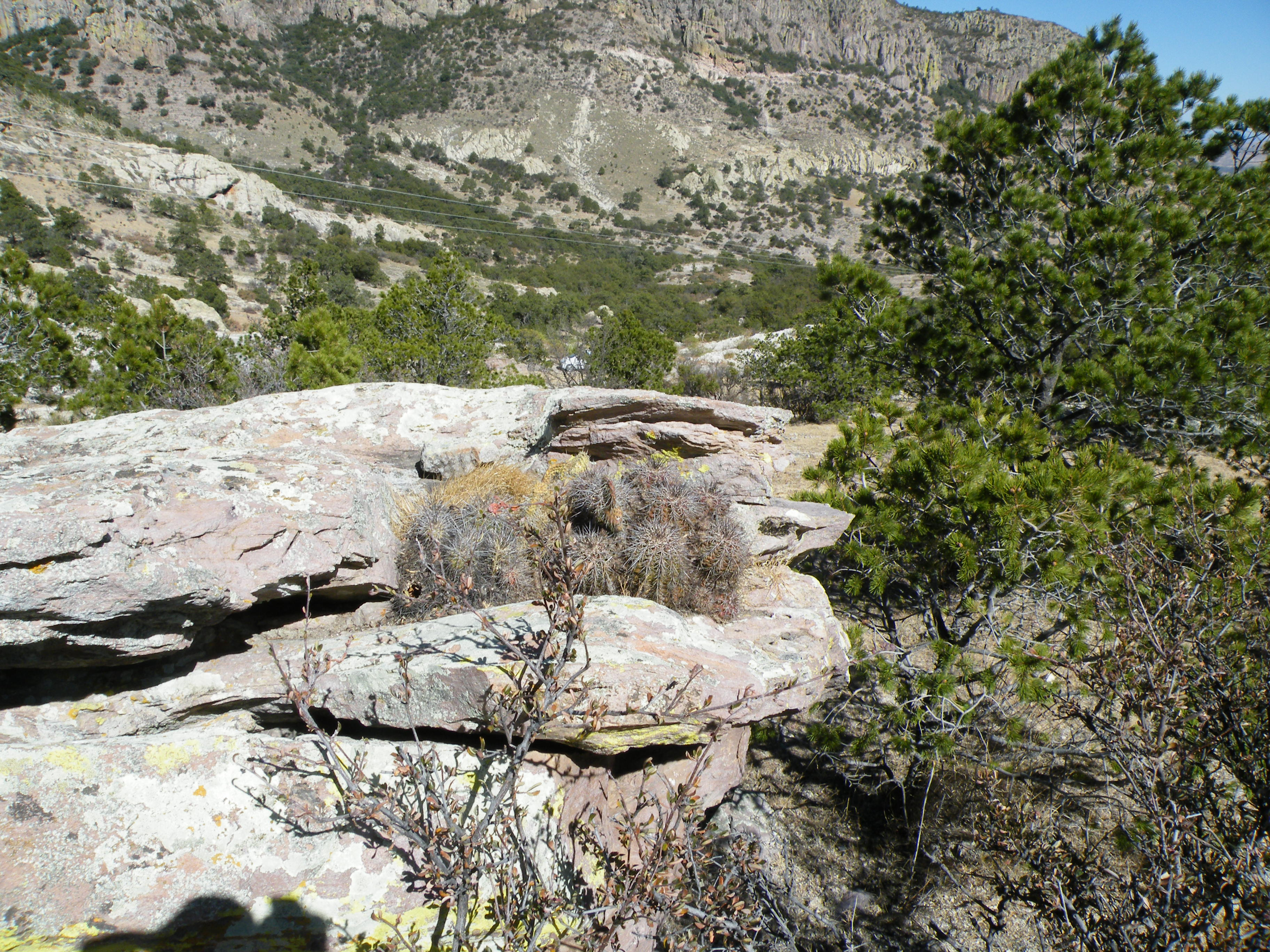
Habitat in Coneto Pass, Durango

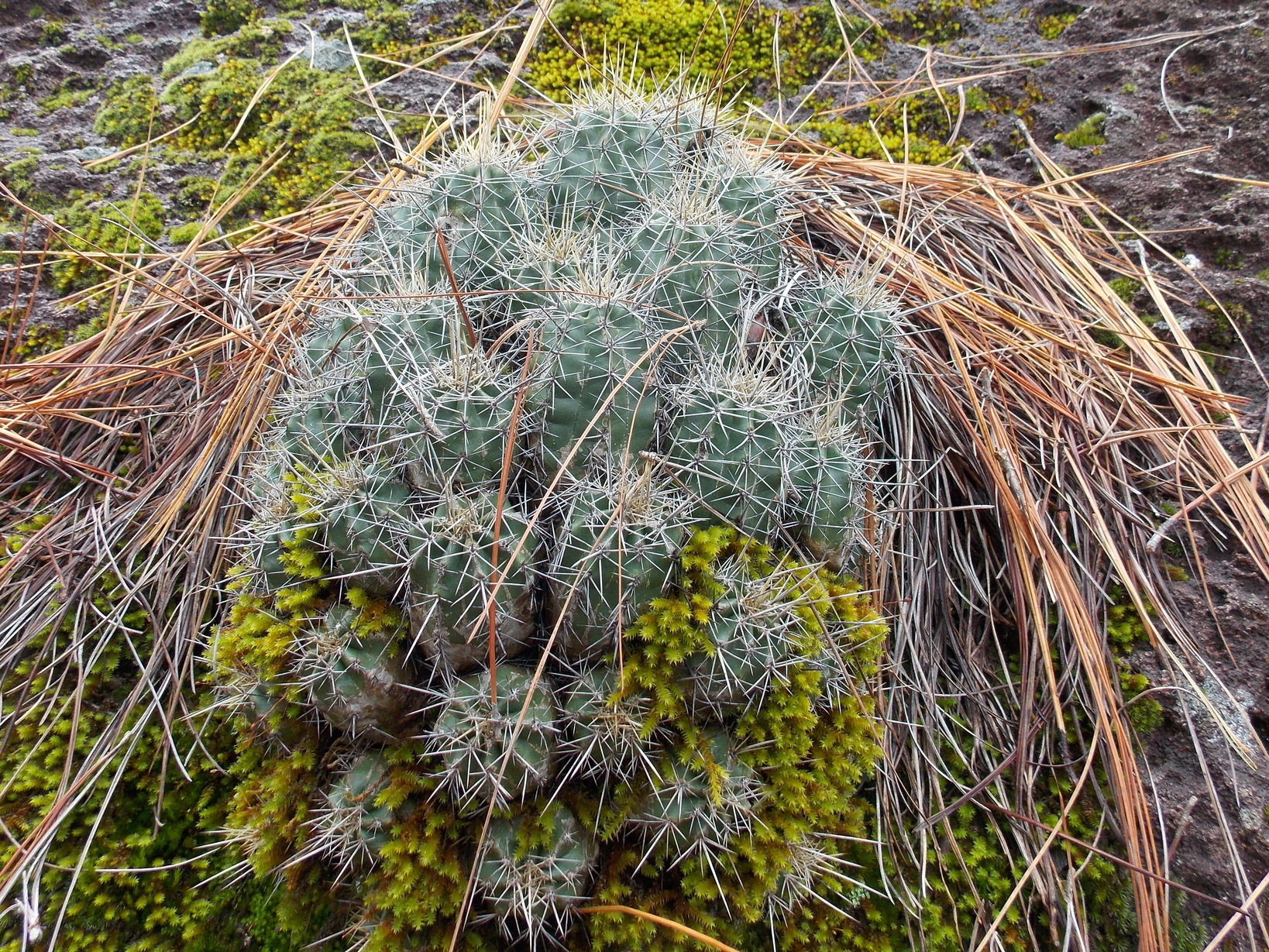
Habitat in Rochéachi, Chihuahua, Mexico

== Taxonomy ==
It was first described as Cereus polyacanthus by George Engelmann in 1848. The specific epithet "polyacanthus" comes from the Greek words "poly" (many) and "akantha" (thorn), referring to the species' thorny shoots.
