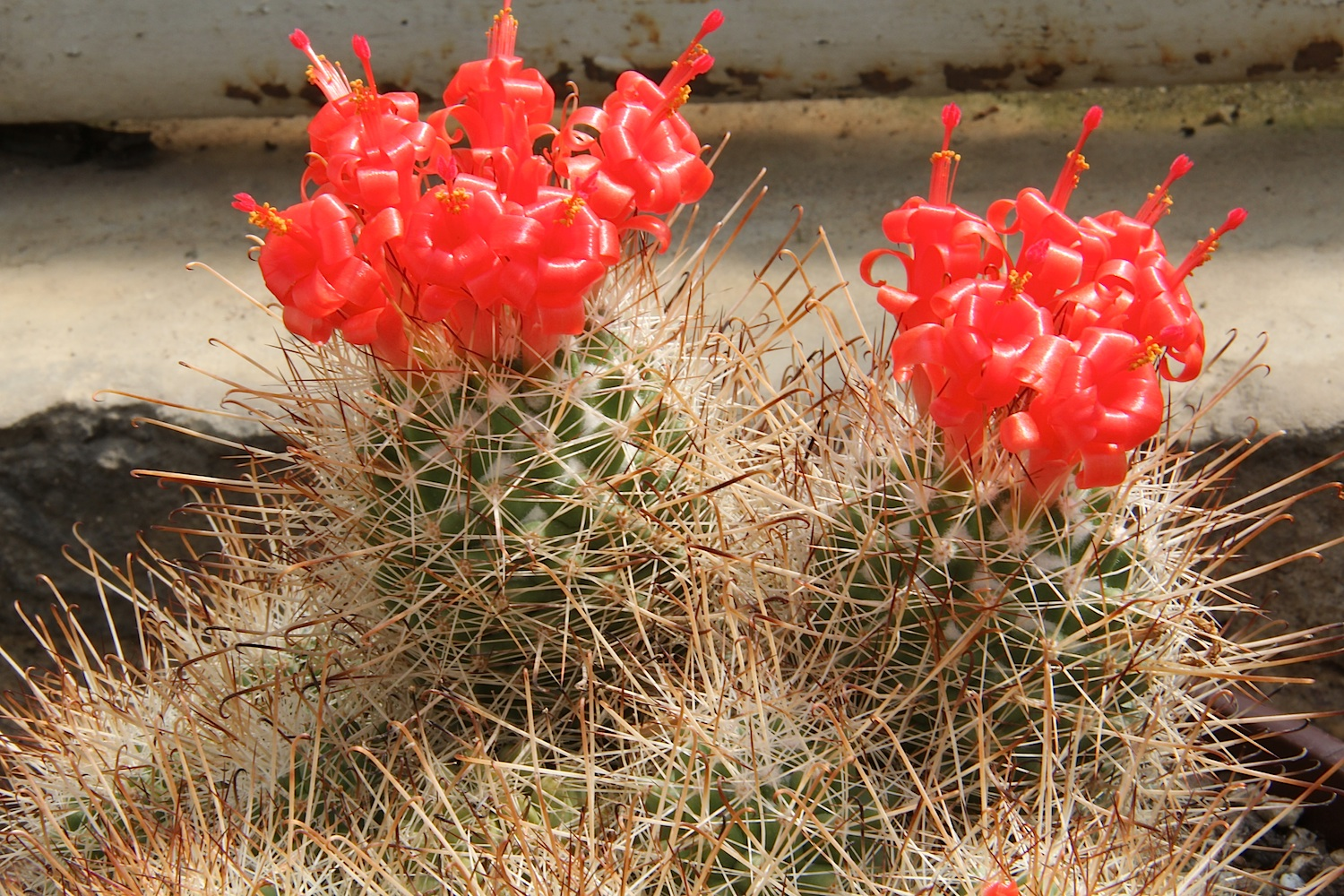

Conservation status
- Least Concern (IUCN 3.1)

Scientific classification
- Kingdom: Plantae
- Clade: Embryophytes
- Clade: Tracheophytes
- Clade: Spermatophytes
- Clade: Angiosperms
- Clade: Eudicots
- Order: Caryophyllales
- Family: Cactaceae
- Subfamily: Cactoideae
- Genus: Cochemiea
- Species: C. poselgeri

Binomial name
- Cochemiea poselgeri (Hildm.) Britton & Rose 1923

Synonyms
- Mammillaria poselgeri Hildm. 1885; Cochemiea roseana (Brandegee) Walton 1899; Mammillaria radleana K.Schum. 1892; Mammillaria radliana Quehl 1892; Mammillaria roseana Brandegee 1891

= Cochemiea poselgeri =

Species of cactus

Cochemiea poselgeri is a species of cactus in the genus Cochemiea commonly known as the Baja California cochemiea. It is endemic to the Mexican state of Baja California Sur.

== Description ==
Cochemiea poselgeri grows in branching clusters from the base, forming large groups. The shoots are cylindrical, up to 2 meters long and 4 cm (1.6 in) in diameter, often hanging over rocks. The triangular warts are slightly rounded at the top and spaced apart. The axillae are woolly with a few bristles. The Areoles are white and wooly with a hooked central spine is 1.5 to 2 cm (0.59 to 0.79 in) long, and there are up to 8 radial spines, 1 centimeter long, brown with white tips.

The flowers are red, 3 cm (1.2 in) in size, with crooked edges. The fruits are red and range from spherical to broadly elongated, 6 to 8 mm (0.24 to 0.31 in) in diameter.

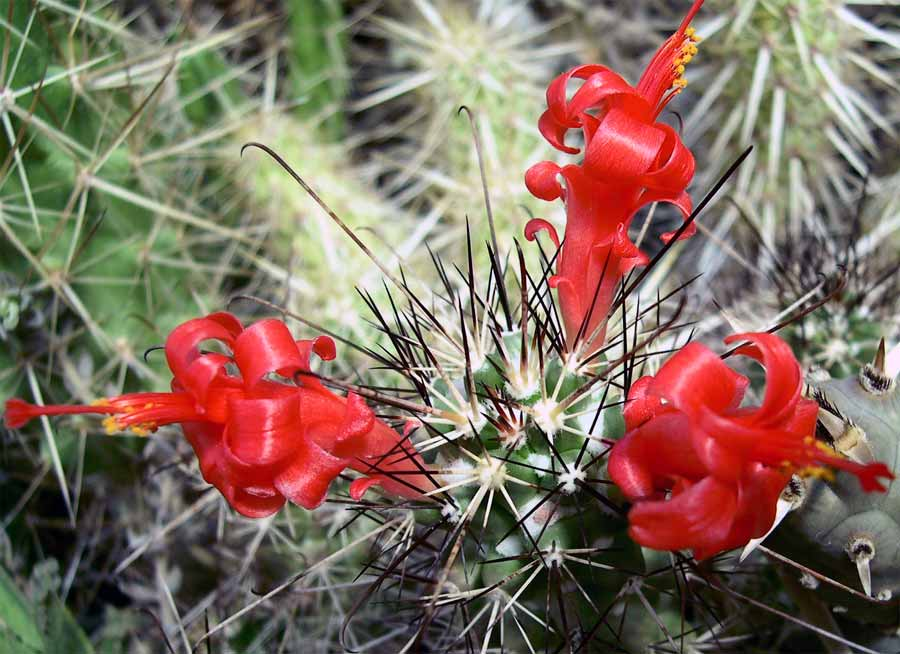
Flower

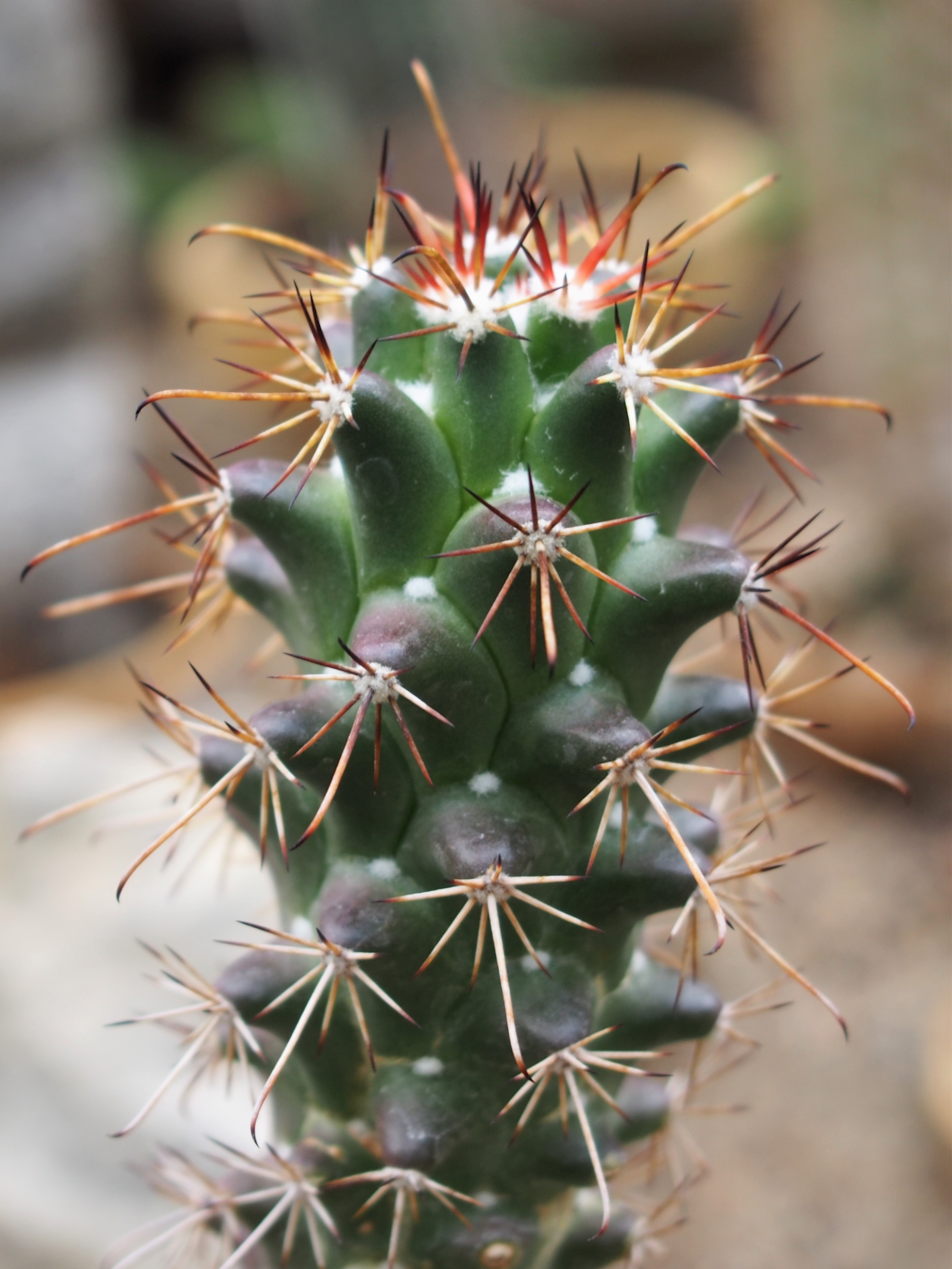
Spines closeup

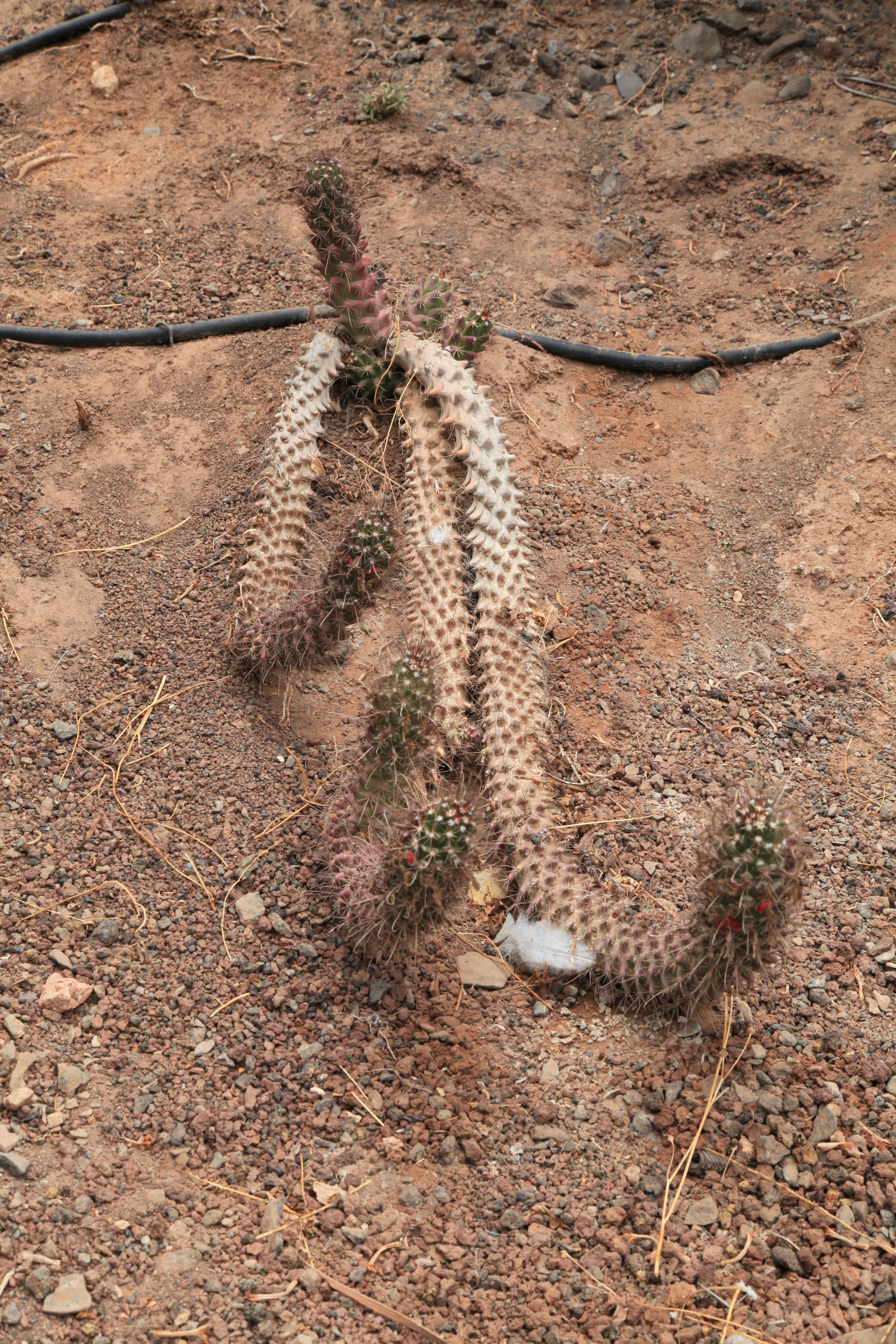
Plant

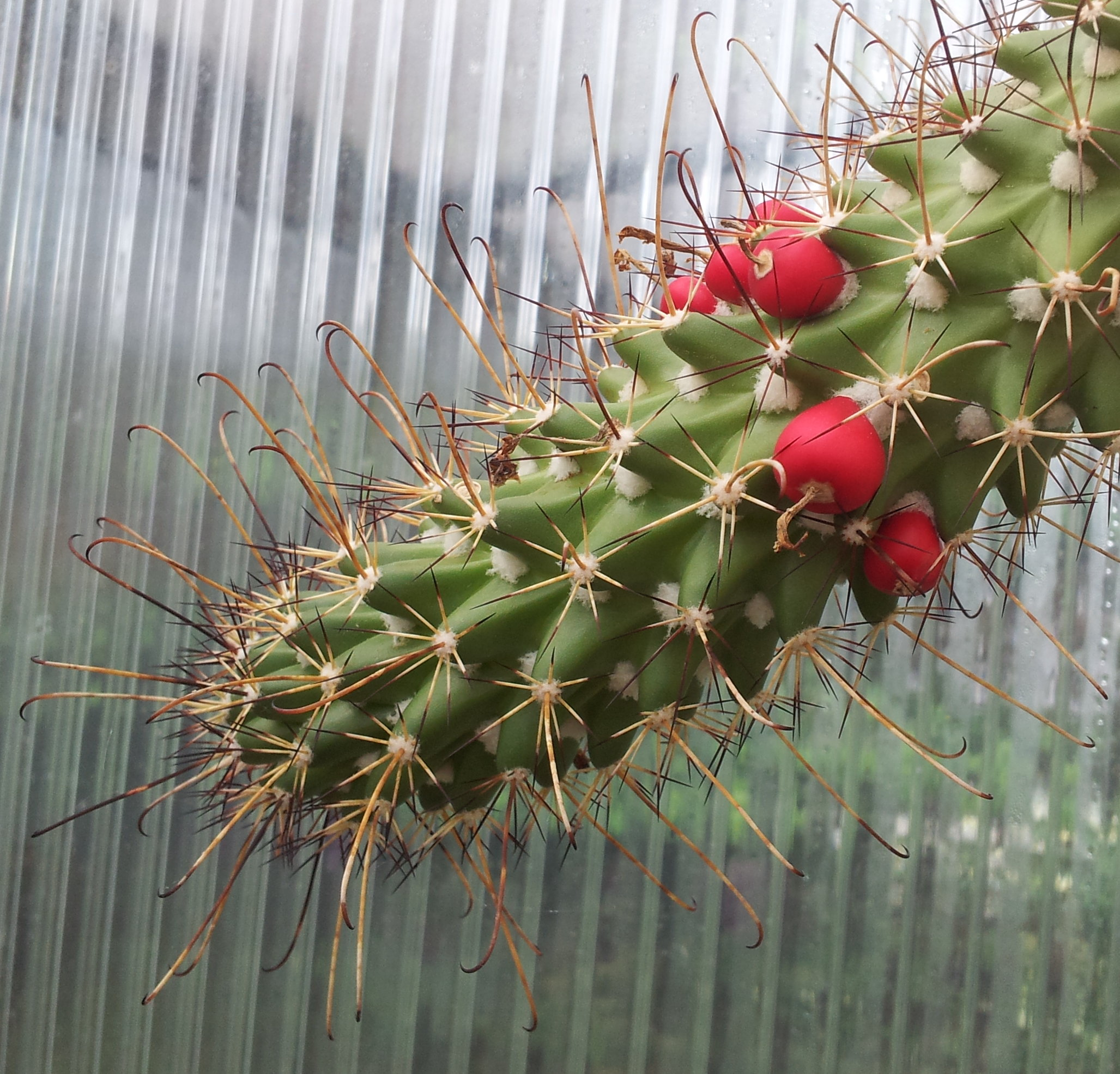
Fruit

== Distribution and habitat ==
Cochemiea poselgeri is endemic to Baja California Sur, Mexico. It is a rather common species, occurring from San Ignacio south to the Cape region. It is also found on a number of adjacent islands in the Gulf of California. This species occurs in the Vizcaino Desert, the Gulf Coast Desert, the Magdalena Plains, and the Cape lowland ecoregions.

It is found growing on flat sandy areas, on rocks and hanging off cliffs and ridges, usually between elevations of 0 to 120 meters. Associated species include Cochemiea fraileana, Cochemiea schumannii, Cochemiea dioica, Lophocereus schottii, Stenocereus gummosus, Echinocereus brandegeei, Echinocereus barthelowianus, Pachycereus pringlei, Pachycereus pecten-aboriginum, Stenocereus thurberi, Ferocactus townsendianus, Peniocereus johnstonii, Opuntia tapona, Cylindropuntia molesta, Opuntia invicta, Cylindropuntia cholla and Jatropha cinerea.

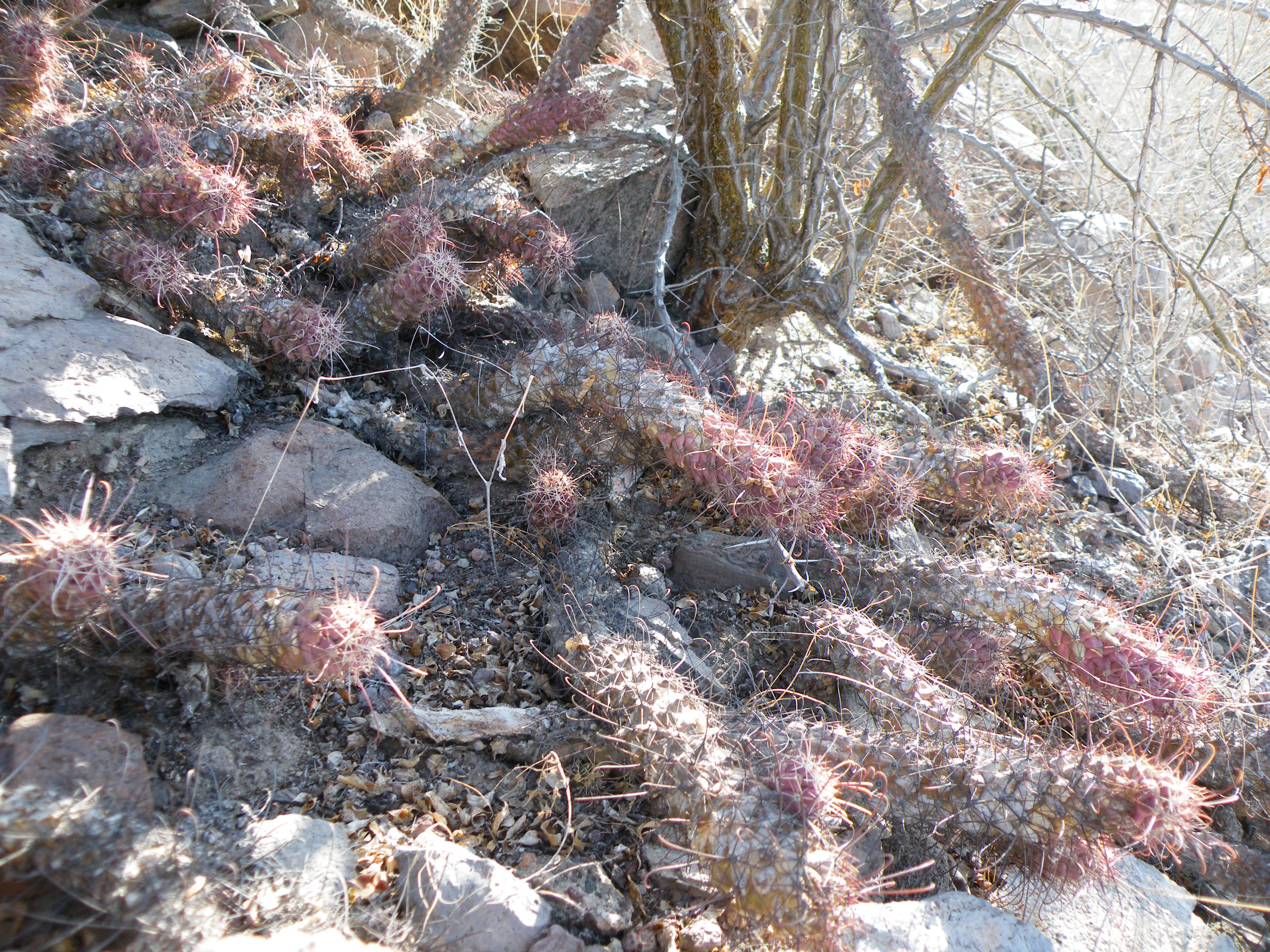
Plant growing in habitat in La Paz, Baja California Sur

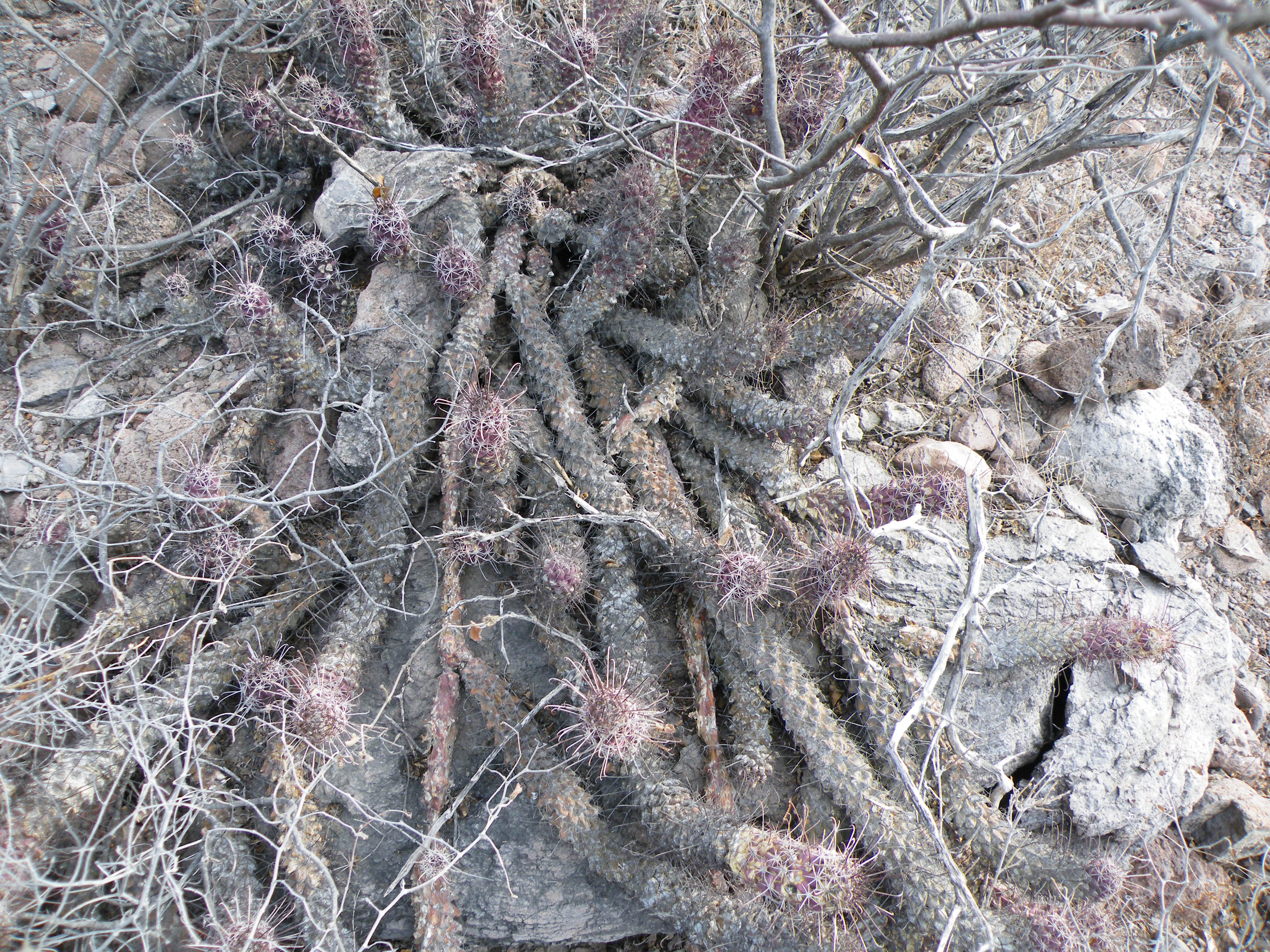

== Taxonomy ==
Originally described as Mammillaria poselgeri by Heinrich Hildmann in 1885, the species name honors German botanist Heinrich Poselger. Nathaniel Lord Britton and Joseph Nelson Rose reclassified it into the genus Cochemiea in 1923.
