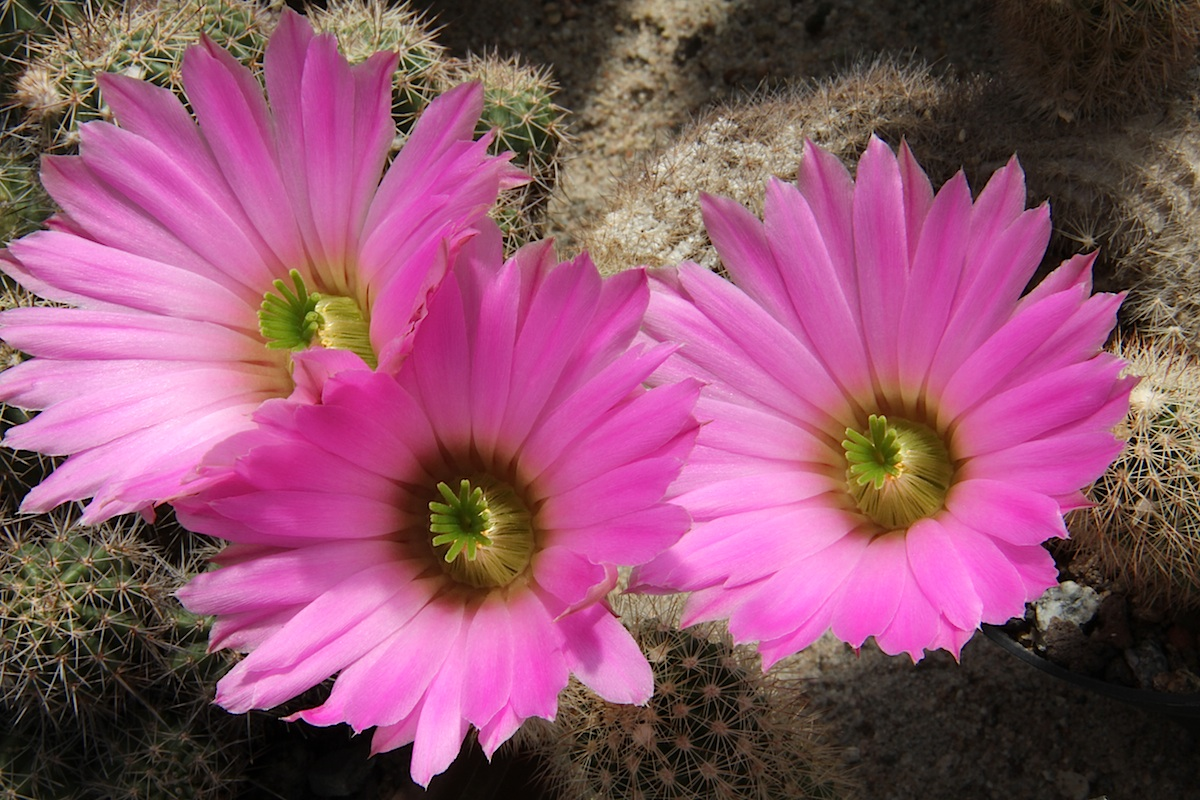

Conservation status
- Endangered (IUCN 3.1)

Scientific classification
- Kingdom: Plantae
- Clade: Tracheophytes
- Clade: Angiosperms
- Clade: Eudicots
- Order: Caryophyllales
- Family: Cactaceae
- Subfamily: Cactoideae
- Genus: Echinocereus
- Species: E. sciurus

Binomial name
- Echinocereus sciurus (K.Brandegee) Dams 1904

Synonyms
- Cereus sciurus Brandegee 1904

= Echinocereus sciurus =

Species of cactus

Echinocereus sciurus is a species of cactus native to Mexico.

== Description ==
Echinocereus sciurus grows like a groundcover, forming clusters up to 60 cm (24 in) wide. The slender shoots, often up to 20 cm (7.9 in) long, are almost hidden by numerous thorns. It has 12 to 17 low ribs, divided into tubercles spaced 5 to 6 mm (0.20 to 0.24 in) apart. The 15 to 18 slender radial spines, pale with brownish tips, are arranged in a circle with small areoles. Several central spines are shorter and have a brown sloping spine. The funnel-shaped flowers are light to deep purple-pink, up to 7 cm (2.8 in) long, and 9 cm (3.5 in) in diameter, with numerous stamens having greenish filaments and a green stigma.

== Subspecies ==
There are two recognized subspecies:

Image	Scientific name	Distribution
	Echinocereus sciurus subsp. floresii (Backeb.) N.P.Taylor	Mexico (NW. Sonora)
	Echinocereus sciurus subsp. sciurus	Mexico (S. Baja California Sur)

== Distribution ==
Echinocereus sciurus is found in the Sonoran Desert in Baja California Sur and Sinaloa, Mexico, at elevations between 10 and 200 meters. Plants are found growing along with Pachycereus pringlei, Stenocereus thurberi, Lophocereus schottii, Ferocactus townsendianus, Echinocereus barthelowianus, Peniocereus johnstonii, Stenocereus gummosus, Cochemiea schumannii, Cochemiea armillata, and Mammillaria peninsularis.

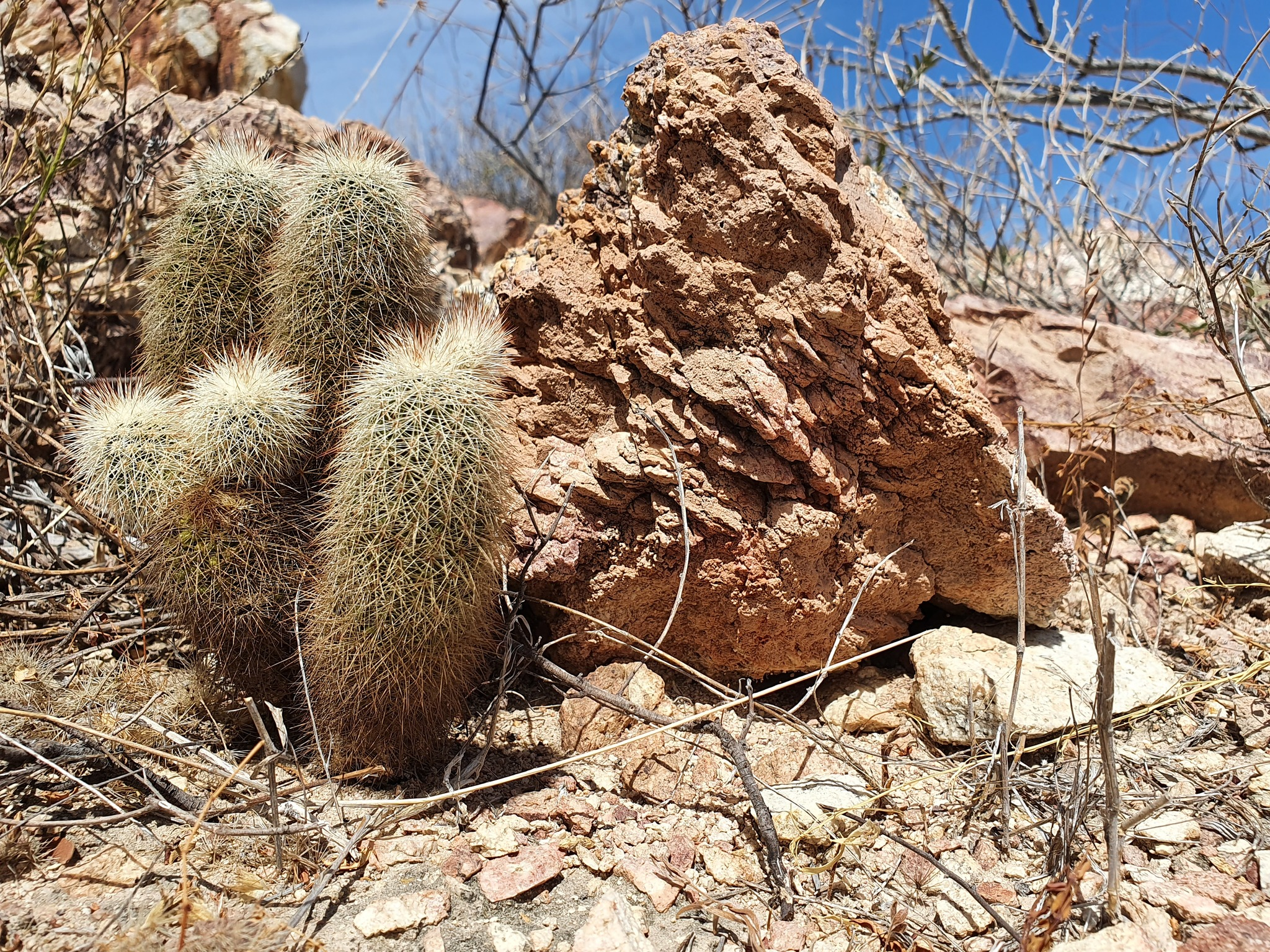
Plant growing in Cabo San Lucas, Baja California Sur, Mexico

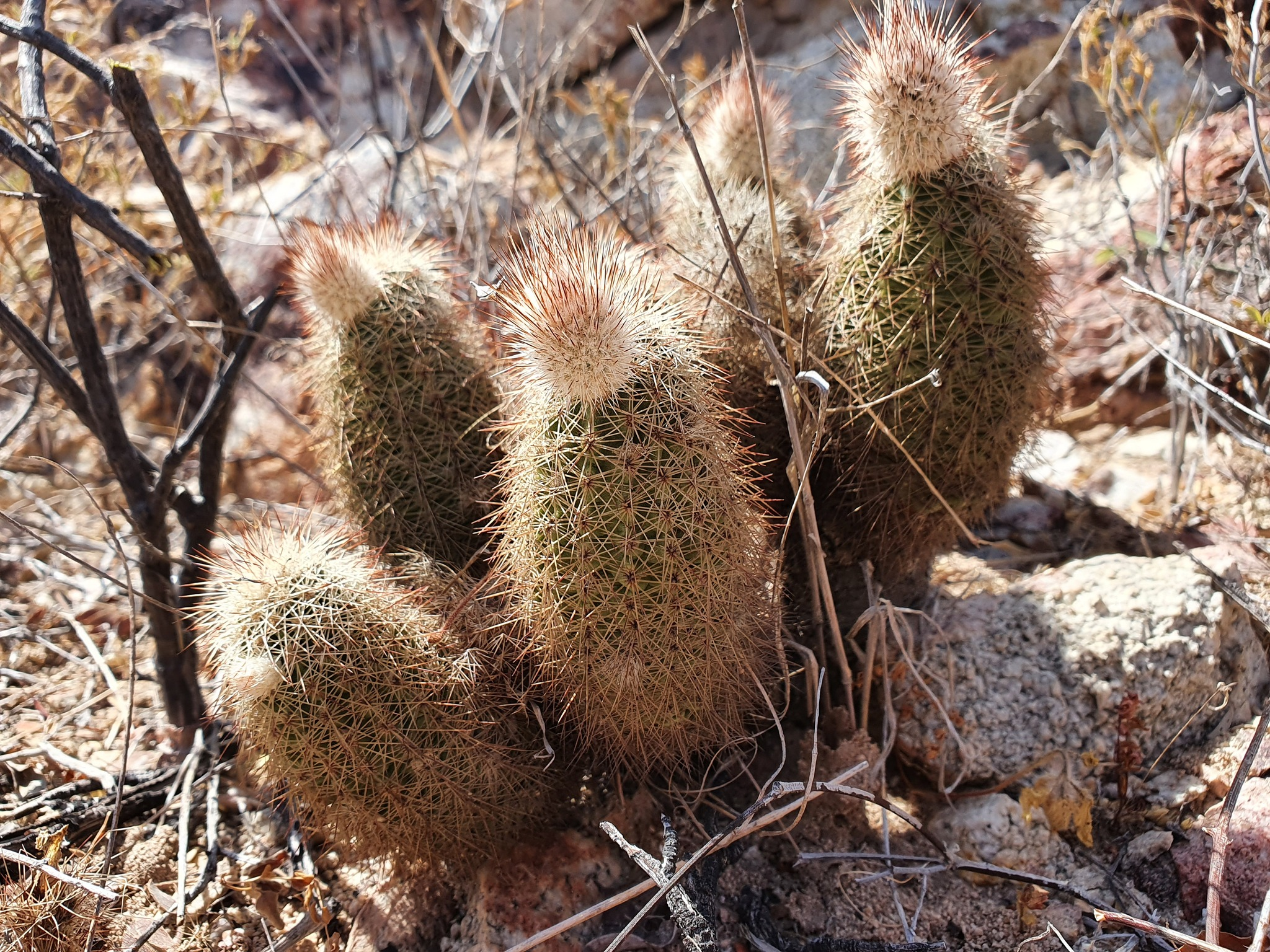
Habitat in San José del Cabo, Baja California Sur, Mexico

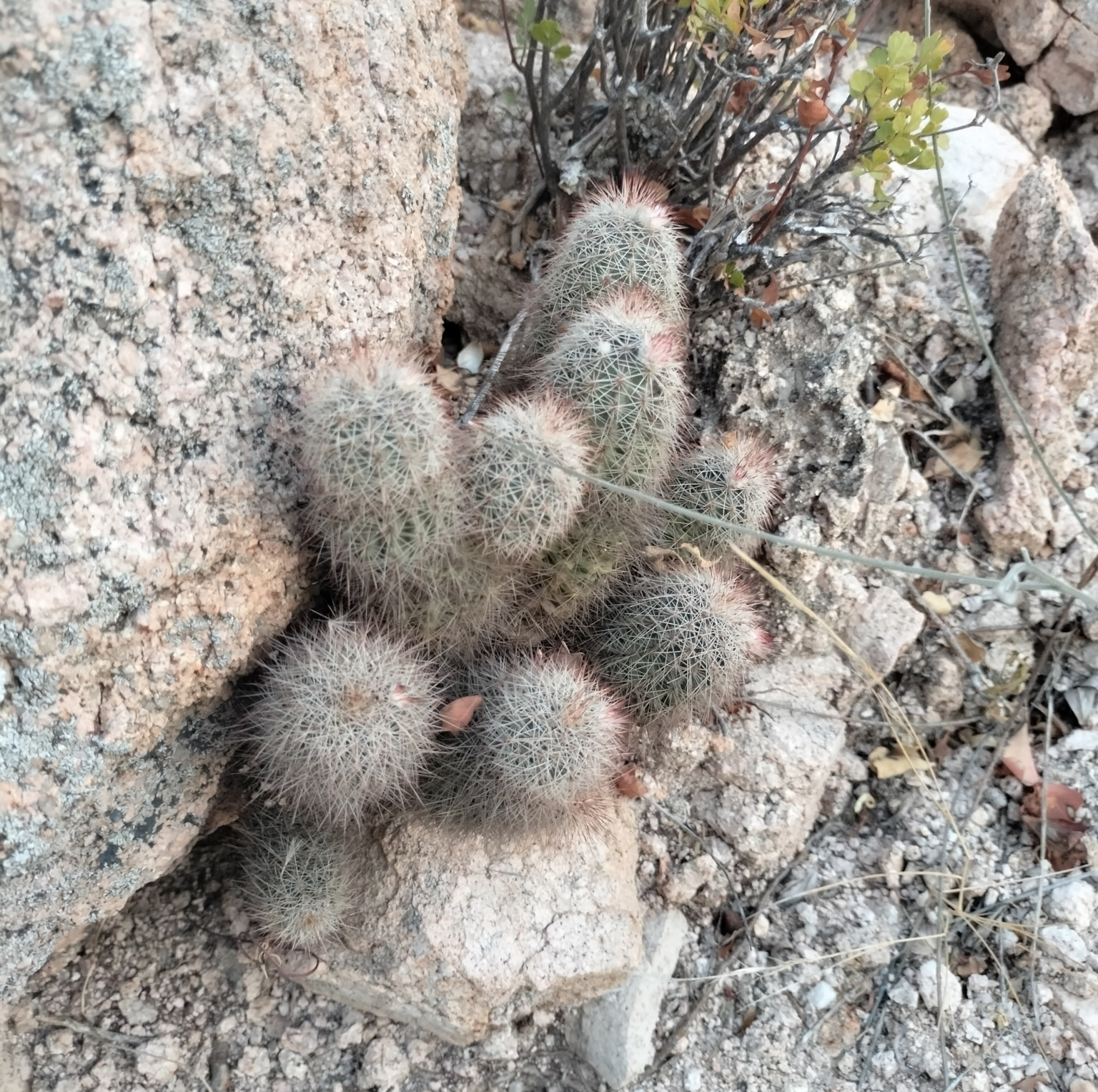
Plant growing in Cabo Pulmo, Baja California Sur, Mexico

== Taxonomy ==
Originally described as Cereus sciurus by Mary Katharine Brandegee in 1904, the species name 'sciurus' means 'squirrel,' referring to the color and texture of the spines. Erich Dams reclassified it under the genus Echinocereus in the same year.
