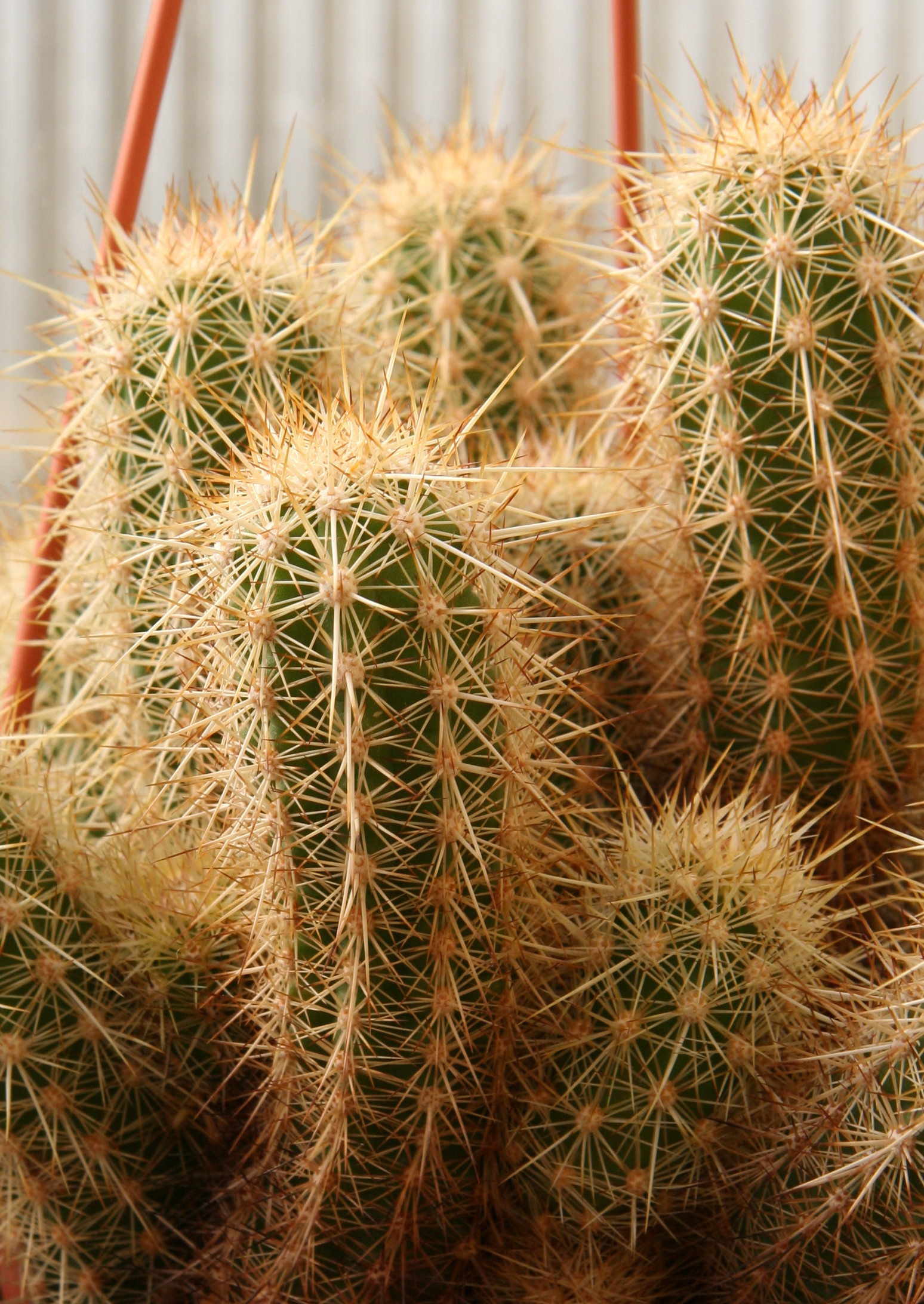

Conservation status
- Endangered (IUCN 3.1)

Scientific classification
- Kingdom: Plantae
- Clade: Tracheophytes
- Clade: Angiosperms
- Clade: Eudicots
- Order: Caryophyllales
- Family: Cactaceae
- Subfamily: Cactoideae
- Genus: Echinocereus
- Species: E. barthelowianus

Binomial name
- Echinocereus barthelowianus Britton & Rose, 1922

= Echinocereus barthelowianus =

Species of cactus

Echinocereus barthelowianus is a species of cactus native to Mexico.

== Description ==
Echinocereus barthelowianus often forms clusters up to 80 cm (31 in) in diameter. Its cylindrical, upright shoots grow up to 30 cm (12 in) long and 3.5 to 5 cm (1.4 to 2.0 in) in diameter, mostly covered by dense thorns. It has eight to ten slightly tuberous ribs with large areoles. The thorns, pink to red when young, darken to black with age. The five to nine strong, straight central spines can reach up to 7 cm (2.8 in) long, and the 18 marginal spines are 1 to 2 cm (0.39 to 0.79 in) long.

The broad, funnel-shaped flowers are lavender and appear from the shoot tips to the base. They grow up to 5 cm (2.0 in) long and 4 to 6 cm (1.6 to 2.4 in) in diameter.

== Distribution ==
Echinocereus barthelowianus is widespread in Baja California Sur, particularly around Isla Magdalena and neighboring islands growing on rocky hillsides at elevations of 10 to 300 m (33 to 984 ft). Plants grow among Cochemiea halei, Cochemiea poselgeri, Cochemiea dioica, Cochemiea schumannii, Stenocereus eruca, Stenocereus gummosus, Cylindropuntia molesta, Cylindropuntia cholla, Cylindropuntia tesajo, Opuntia pycnantha, Opuntia invicta, Pachycereus pringlei, Stenocereus thurberi, and Lophocereus schottii.

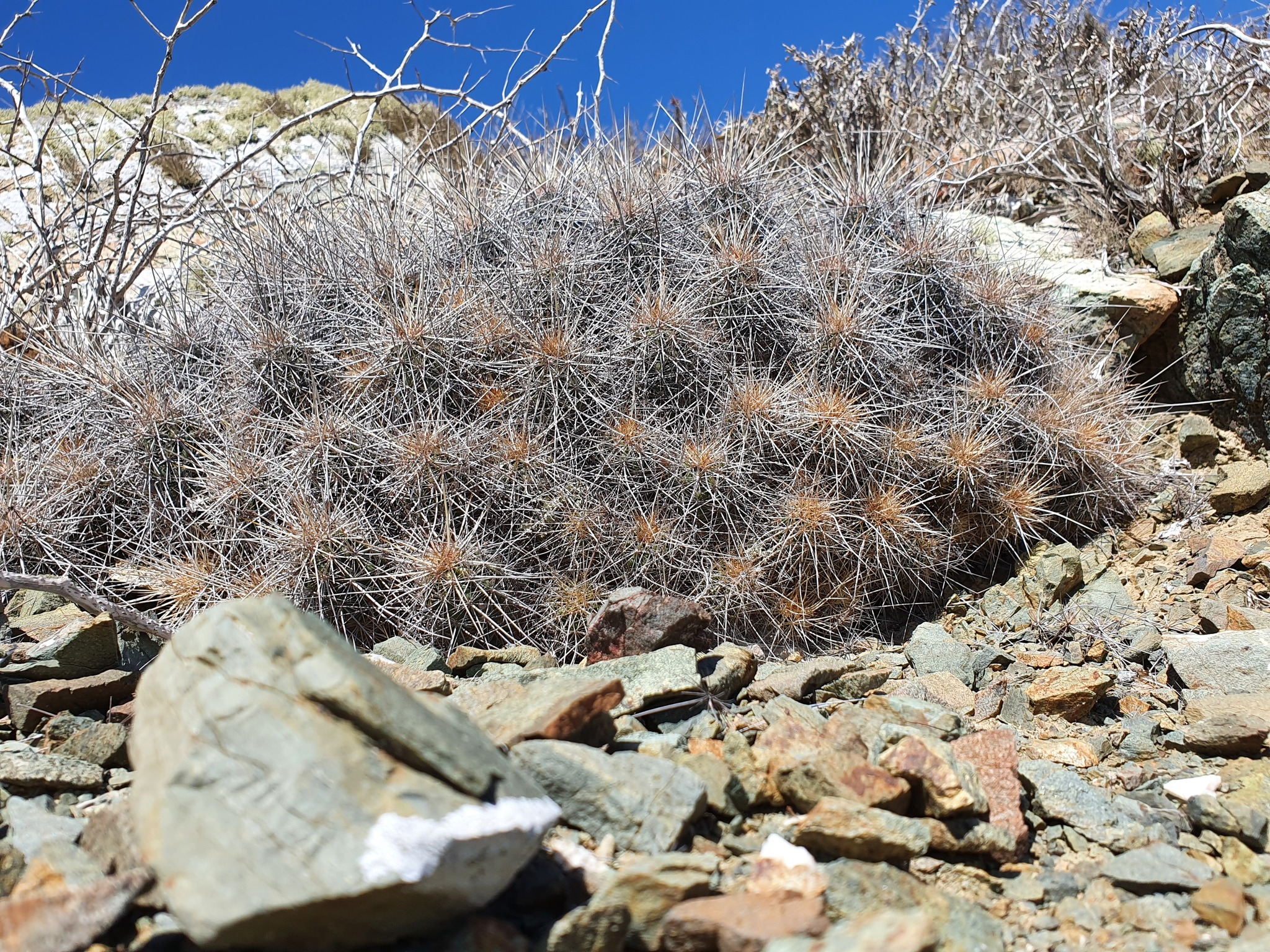
Habitat in Magdalena, Baja California Sur, Mexico

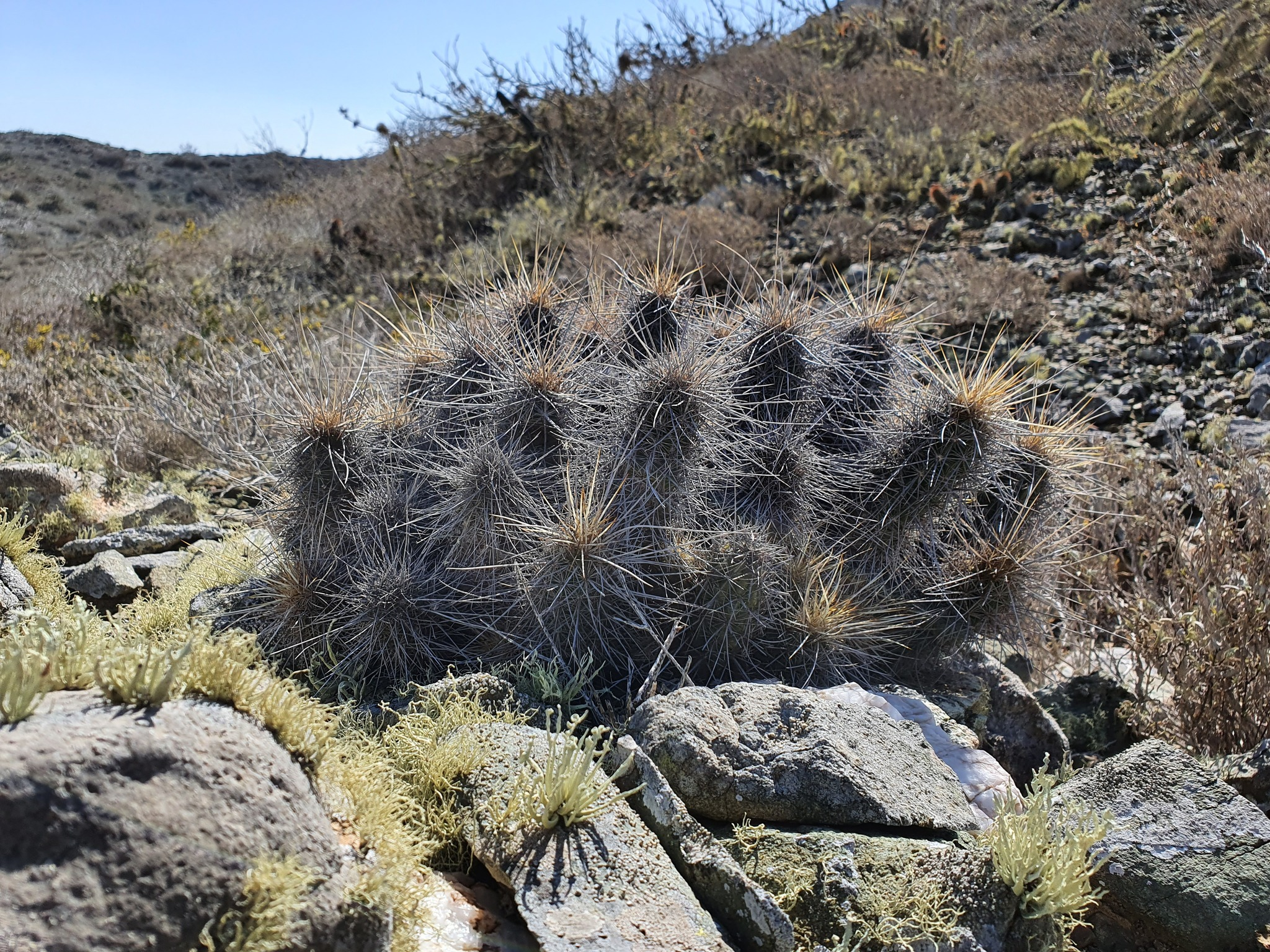
Habitat in San Carlos, Baja California Sur, Mexico

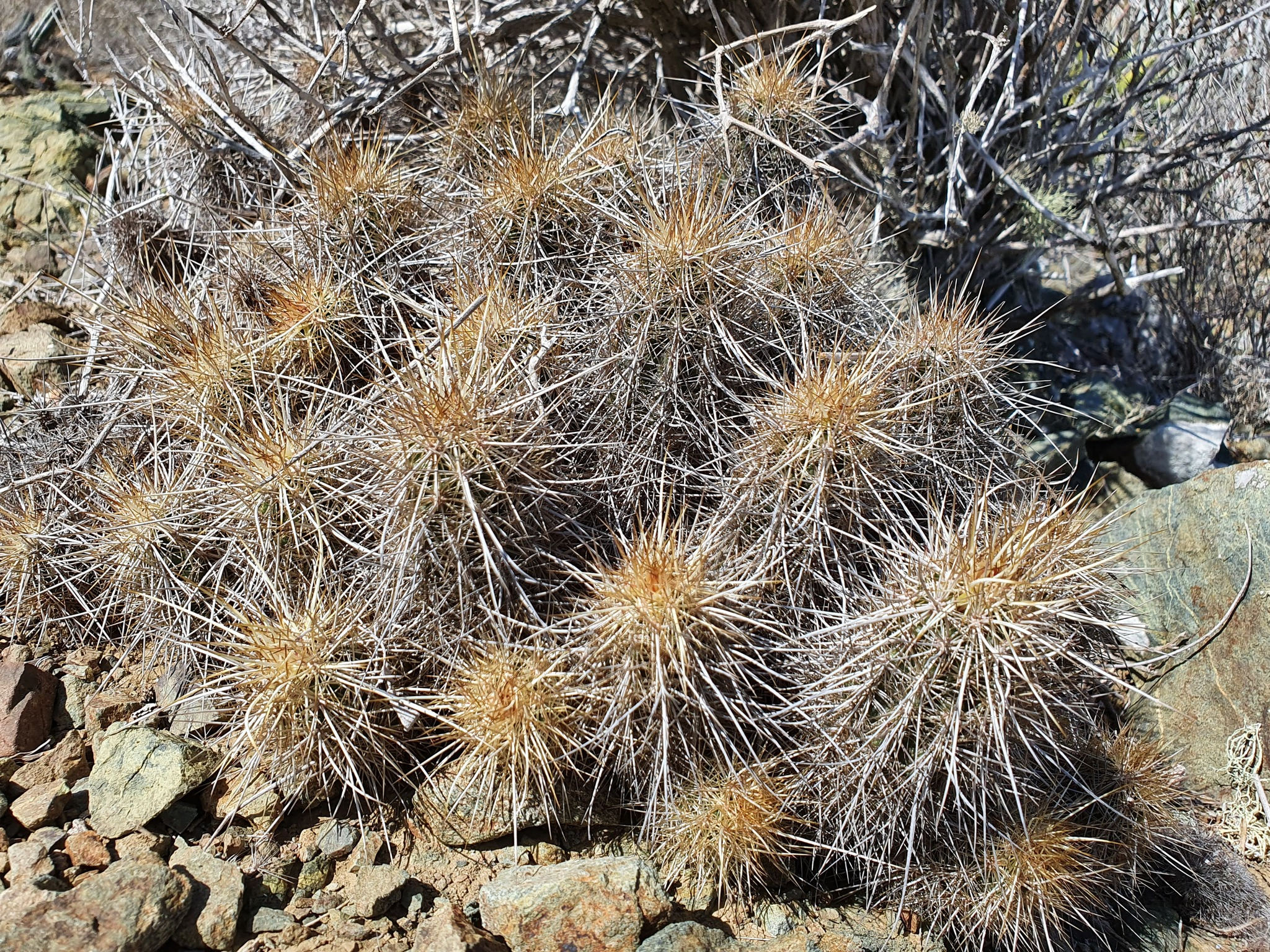
Habitat in San Buto, Baja California

== Taxonomy ==
Nathaniel Lord Britton and Joseph Nelson Rose first described this species in 1922 in the third volume of The Cactaceae. The specific epithet "barthelowanus" honors Captain Benjamin Barthelow, who accompanied Rose in exploring the Lower California coast on the US steamship Albatross.
