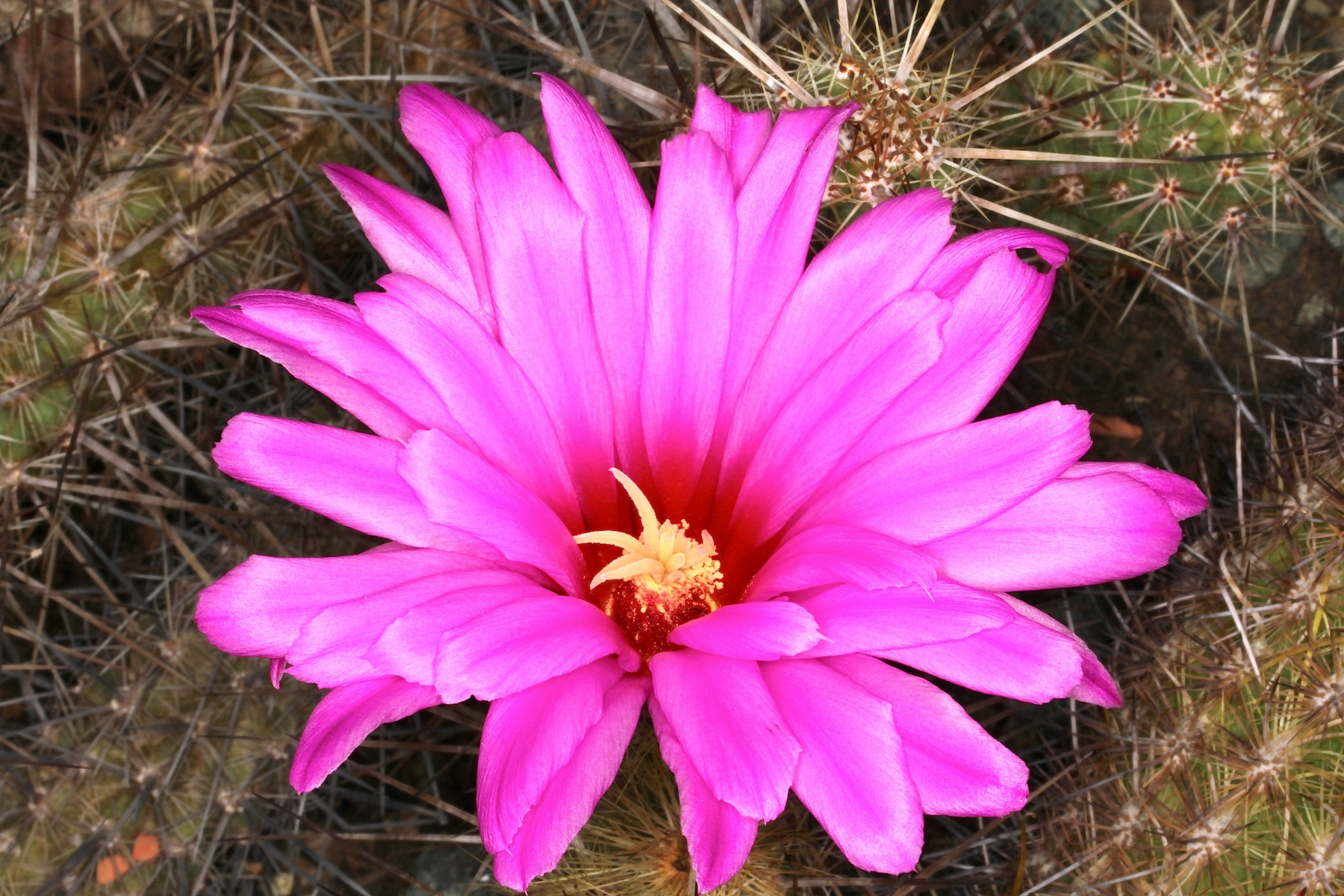

Conservation status
- Least Concern (IUCN 3.1)

Scientific classification
- Kingdom: Plantae
- Clade: Tracheophytes
- Clade: Angiosperms
- Clade: Eudicots
- Order: Caryophyllales
- Family: Cactaceae
- Subfamily: Cactoideae
- Genus: Echinocereus
- Species: E. brandegeei

Binomial name
- Echinocereus brandegeei (J.M.Coult.) K. Schum., 1898
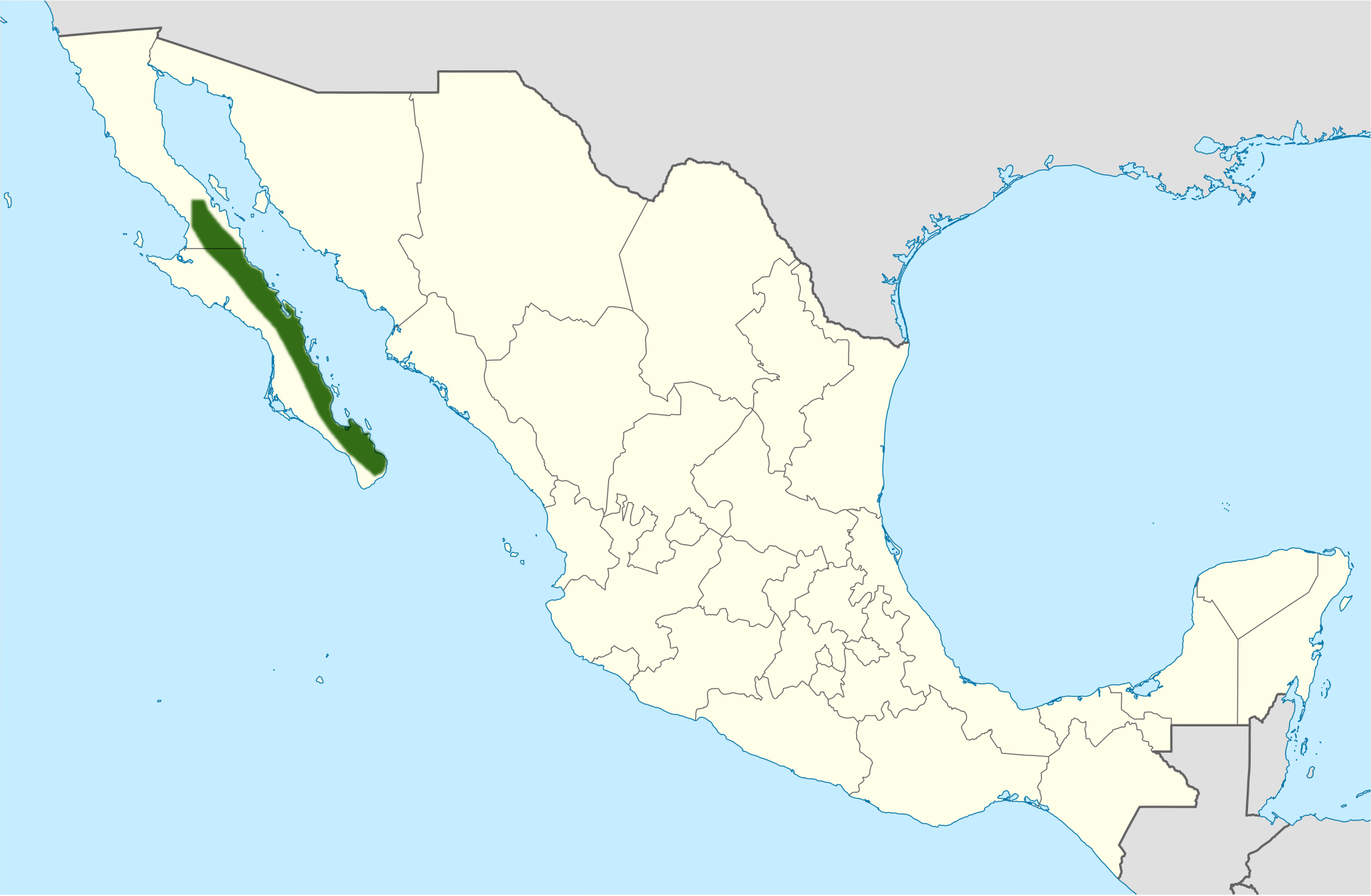

Synonyms
- Cereus brandegeei J.M.Coult. 1896; Cereus mamillatus Engelm. ex J.M.Coult. 1896; Cereus sanborgianus J.M.Coult. 1896; Echinocereus mamillatus (Engelm. ex J.M.Coult.) Britton & Rose 1922

= Echinocereus brandegeei =

Species of cactus

Echinocereus brandegeei is a species of cactus native to Mexico.

== Description ==
Echinocereus brandegeei grows with multiple shoots, forming large, loose clumps up to 2 meters in diameter. The light green, cylindrical shoots vary in size, creeping at their base with upright tips. They can reach up to 100 cm (39 in) in length and 6 cm (2.4 in) in diameter. Each shoot has eight to ten sharply angular ribs and is densely covered with thorns ranging in color from white to black. The four central spines, arranged crosswise, are flattened, stiff, and sword-like, measuring 3 to 13 cm (1.2 to 5.1 in) long. The ten to 18 radial spines are rounded, stiff, and up to 2 cm (0.79 in) long.

The broadly funnel-shaped flowers are light purple-lavender to light pink with a bright red throat. They appear along the entire shoot, measuring 5.5 to 9.5 cm (2.2 to 3.7 in) in length and 4 to 8.3 cm (1.6 to 3.3 in) in diameter. The spherical fruits are red.

== Distribution ==
Echinocereus brandegeei is found on the Baja California peninsula and some islands in the Gulf of Mexico all islands from San Marcos to Espíritu Santo. It thrives in very dry areas, xeric scrublands, stony areas, and sandy soils near the beach at elevations from 0 to 300 meters. Plants are found growing around Pachycereus pringlei, Stenocereus thurberi, Opuntia tapona, Stenocereus eruca, Cylindropuntia cholla, Ferocactus peninsulae, Ferocactus emoryi subsp. rectispinus, Stenocereus gummosus, Stenocereus thurberi, Jatropha cuneata, Euphorbia lomelii, Bursera microphylla and Fouquieria diguetii. In some part of its range it grows among Echinocereus maritimus and Opuntia invicta.

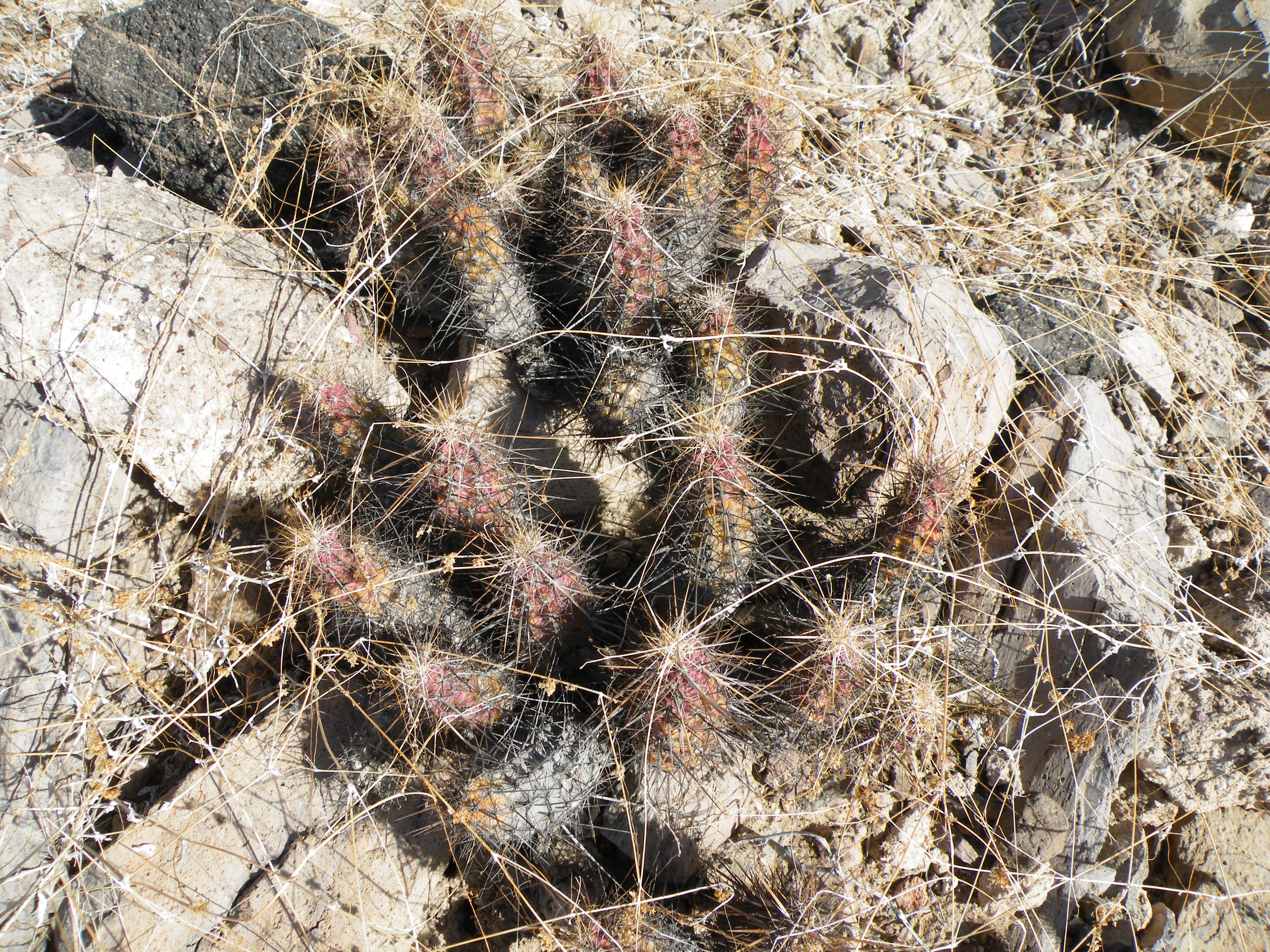
Plant growing in La Paz, Baja California Sur

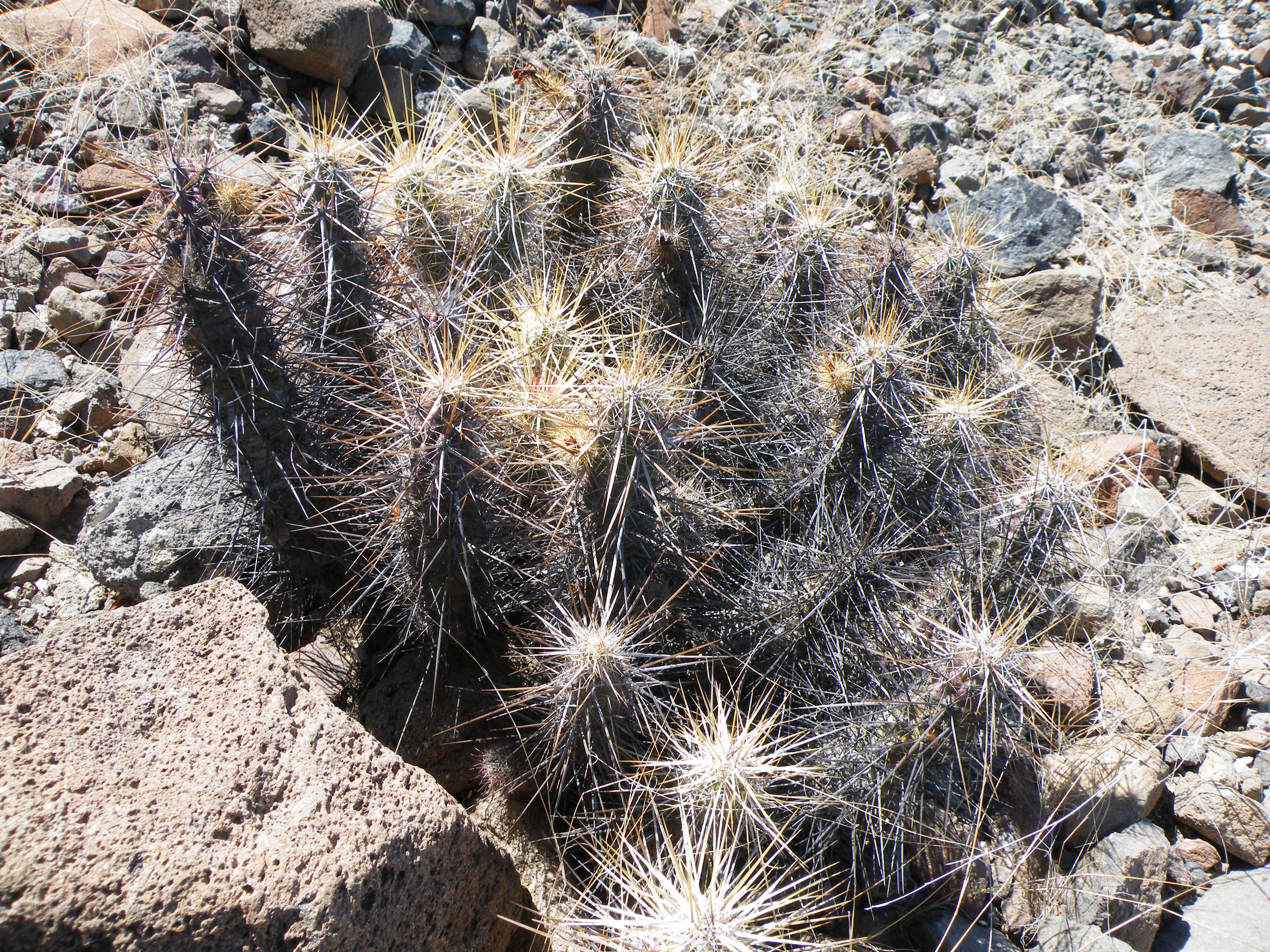
Plant growing in Pichilingue, Baja California Sur

== Taxonomy ==
Originally described as Cereus brandegeei by John Merle Coulter in 1896, the species was later placed in the genus Echinocereus by Karl Moritz Schumann in 1898. The specific epithet honors American botanist and plant collector Townshend Stith Brandegee.
