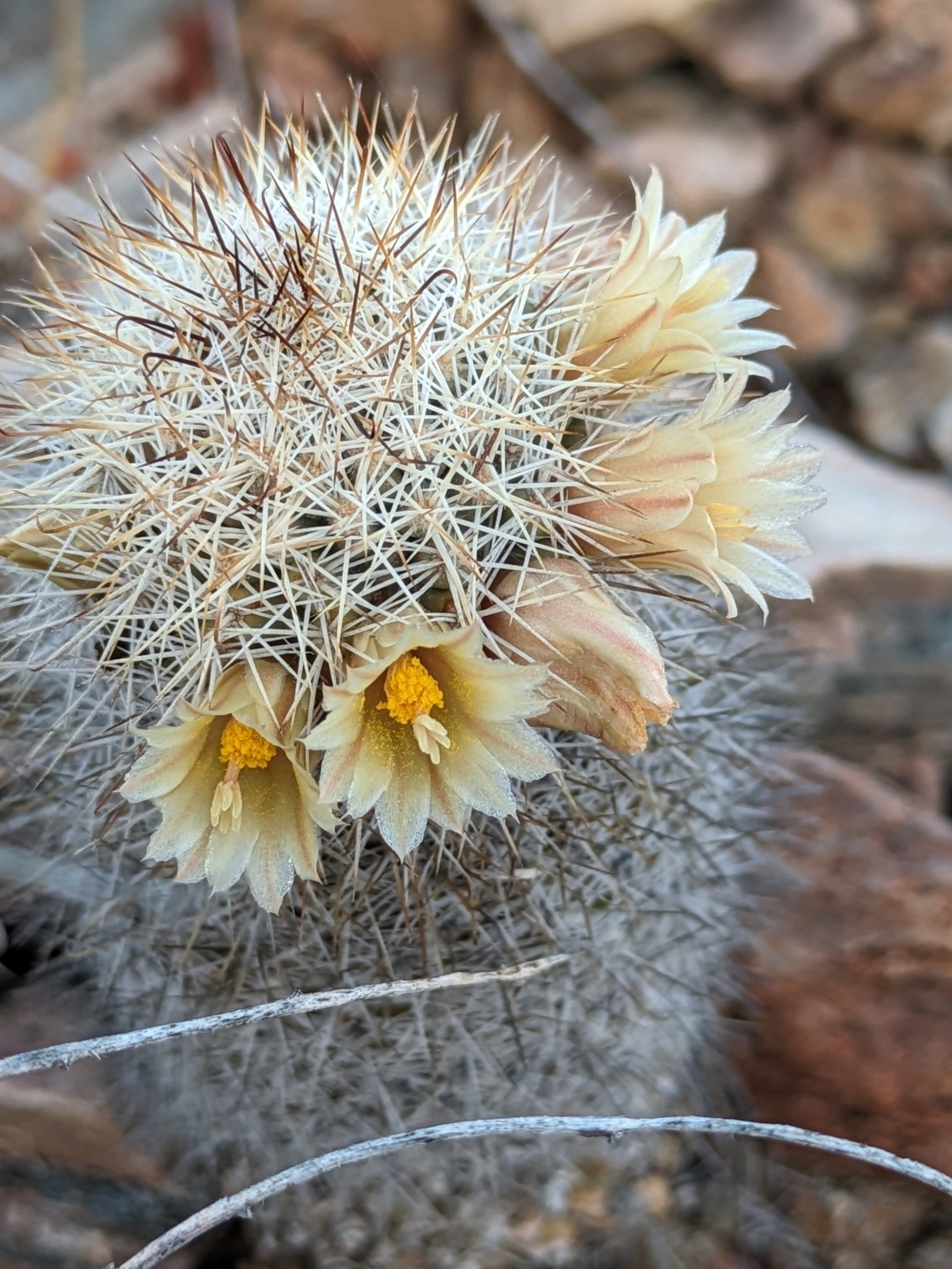
- In flower near Todos Santos

Conservation status
- Vulnerable (IUCN 3.1)

Scientific classification
- Kingdom: Plantae
- Clade: Tracheophytes
- Clade: Angiosperms
- Clade: Eudicots
- Order: Caryophyllales
- Family: Cactaceae
- Subfamily: Cactoideae
- Genus: Cochemiea
- Species: C. armillata

Binomial name
- Cochemiea armillata (K.Brandegee) P.B.Breslin & Majure

Synonyms
- List: Bartschella armillata (K.Brandegee) Doweld 2000; Chilita armillata (K.Brandegee) Orcutt 1926; Ebnerella armillata (K.Brandegee) Buxb. 1951; Mammillaria armillata K.Brandegee 1900; Mammillaria dioica var. armillata (K.Brandegee) Neutel. 1986; Neomammillaria armillata (K.Brandegee) Britton & Rose 1923; Neomammillaria lapacena H.E.Gates 1932

= Cochemiea armillata =

Species of cactus

Cochemiea armillata is an uncommon species of cactus in the genus Cochemiea commonly known as the Los Cabos nipple cactus. This species is endemic to the Cape region of Baja California Sur in Mexico. It is somewhat similar in appearance to the rare Cochemiea capensis and the more common Cochemiea dioica.

== Description ==
Cochemiea armillata initially grows solitary but later forms groups. The plants are slender, cylindrical, and can reach up to 30 cm (12 in) in height and 4 to 5 cm (1.6 to 2.0 in) in diameter, which usually grows with 3 to 12 stems that emerge at the height of the base or sometimes higher. They have firm, blue-green, conical to cylindrical warts without milky sap. The axillae are covered with wool and bristles. Each plant has 1 to 4 strong, yellowish-gray central spines, which darken with age and are partly hooked, measuring 1 to 2 cm (0.39 to 0.79 in) long. The 9 to 15 grayish white radial spines are thin, bristly, straight, and 0.7 to 1.2 cm (0.28 to 0.47 in) long.

The bell-shaped or funnel-shaped flowers are pink-creamy yellow, 1 to 3 cm (0.39 to 1.18 in) long, bell-shaped or funnel-shaped up to 2 cm (0.79 in) in diameter. The filaments are pink with yellow anthers. The stigma is also pink, with 5 to 7 lobes up to 5 mm (0.20 in) long, pinkish red. The red, club-shaped fruits are 1.5 to 3 cm (0.59 to 1.18 in) long and 7 to 10 mm (0.28 to 0.39 in) in diameter, containing black seeds, up to 1 mm (0.039 in) long by 0.5 mm (0.020 in) wide.

== Taxonomy ==
It was first described as Mammillaria armillata in 1900 by Mary Katharine Brandegee. The specific epithet armillata is Latin for 'decorated with clasps,' referring to the species' thorns. In 2021, Peter B. Breslin and Lucas C. Majure reclassified it into the genus Cochemiea.

== Distribution and habitat ==
Cochemiea armillata is endemic to the state of Baja California Sur in Mexico, where it is uncommonly encountered throughout most of the Cape region from La Paz south. It grows in the Gulf Coast desert, the Magdalena Plains, and the Cape lowland ecoregions.

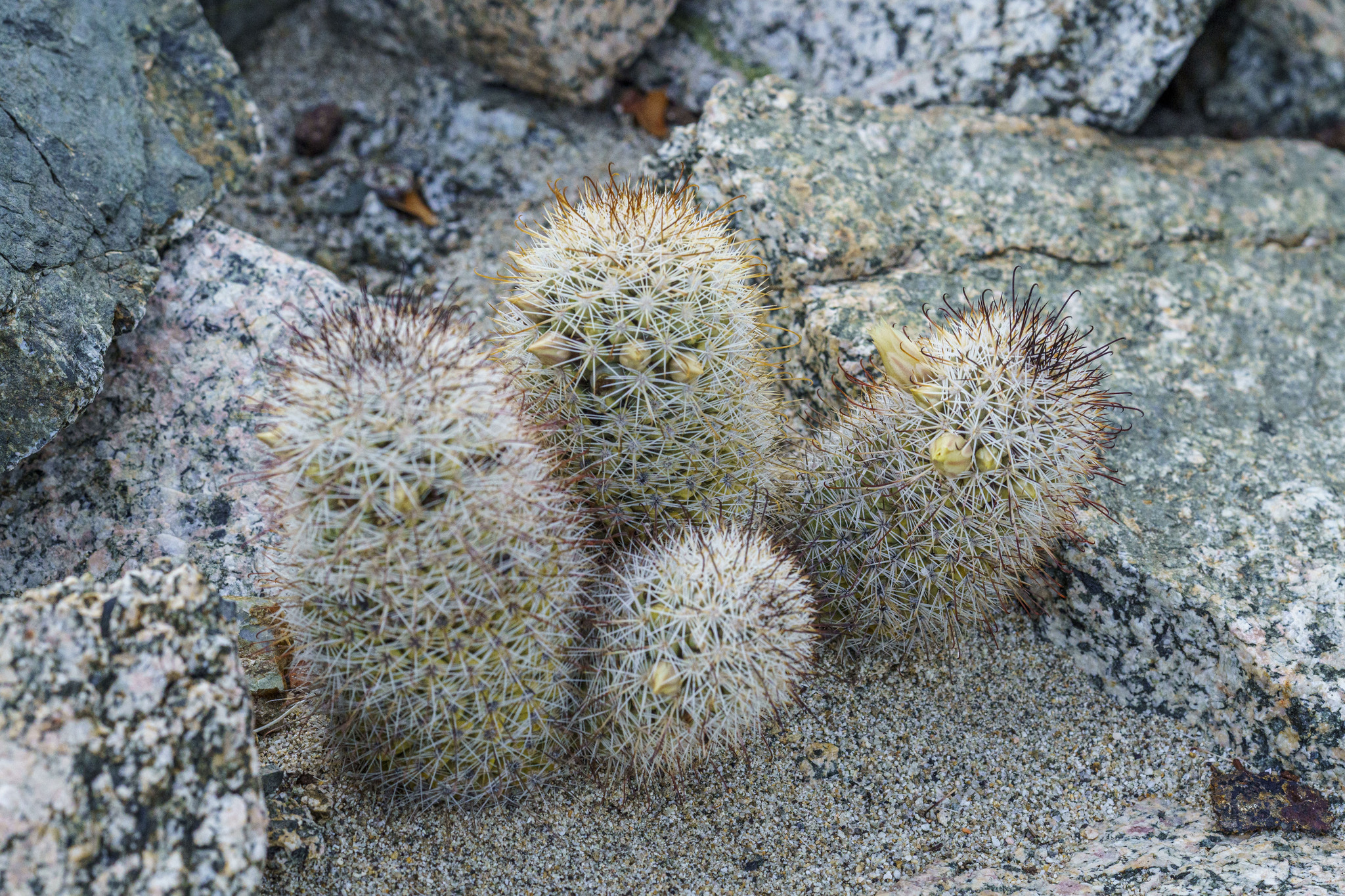
Cochemiea armillata on Isla Cerralvo

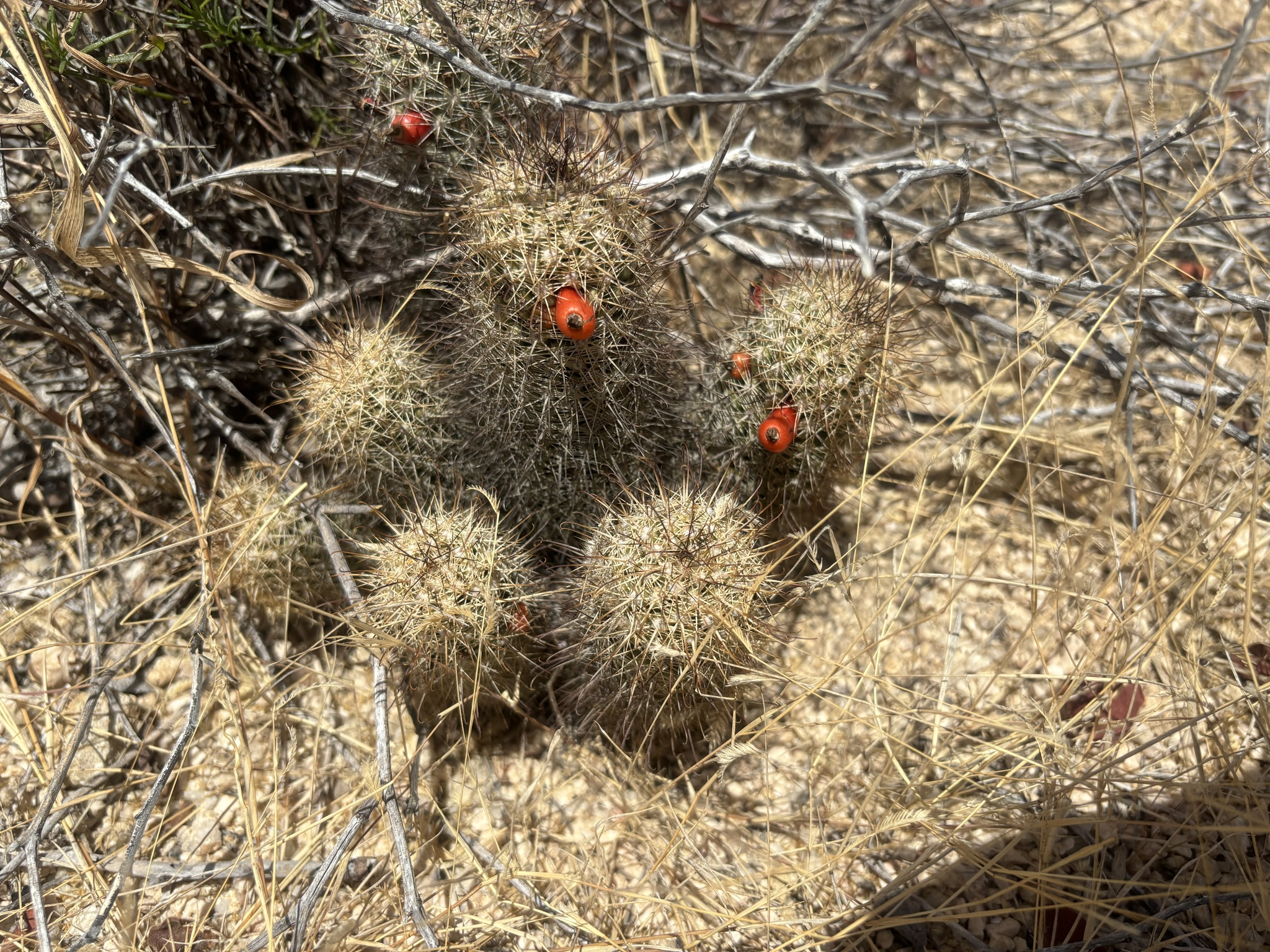
Habitat near San José del Cabo, Baja California Sur, Mexico
