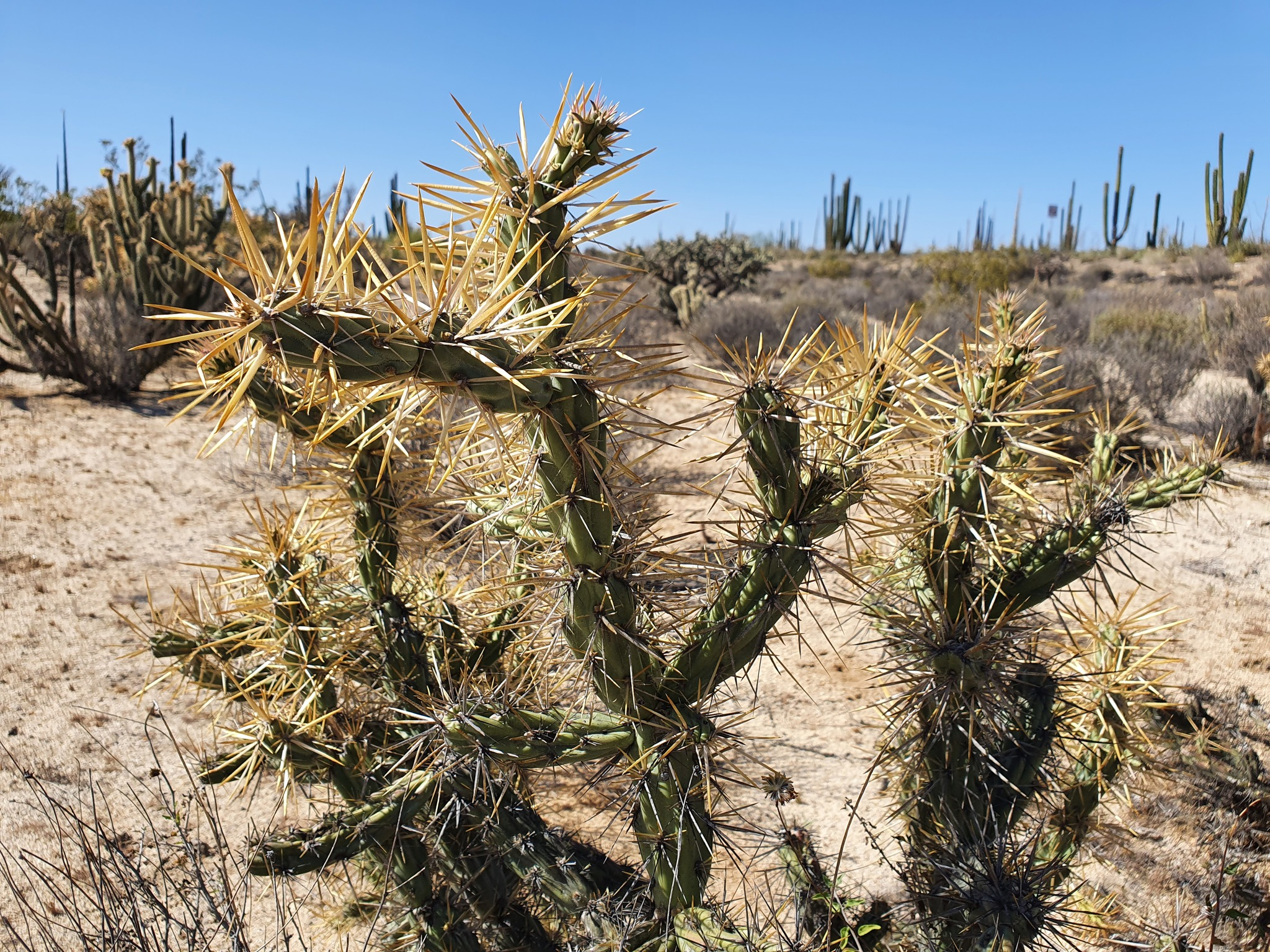

Scientific classification
- Kingdom: Plantae
- Clade: Tracheophytes
- Clade: Angiosperms
- Clade: Eudicots
- Order: Caryophyllales
- Family: Cactaceae
- Genus: Cylindropuntia
- Species: C. molesta

Binomial name
- Cylindropuntia molesta (Brandegee) F.M.Knuth

= Cylindropuntia molesta =

Species of cactus

Cylindropuntia molesta is a cactus species that is endemic to Baja California state in Mexico.

It grows to a size of 2–8 feet in height and 2–5 feet in width.

== Synonyms ==
- Cylindropuntia calmalliana (J.M.Coult.) F.M.Knuth
- Cylindropuntia molesta var. clavellina (Engelm. ex J.M.Coult.) Rebman
- Cylindropuntia molesta subsp. molesta
- Grusonia molesta (Brandegee) G.D.Rowley
- Opuntia calmalliana J.M. Coult.
- Opuntia molesta Brandegee
