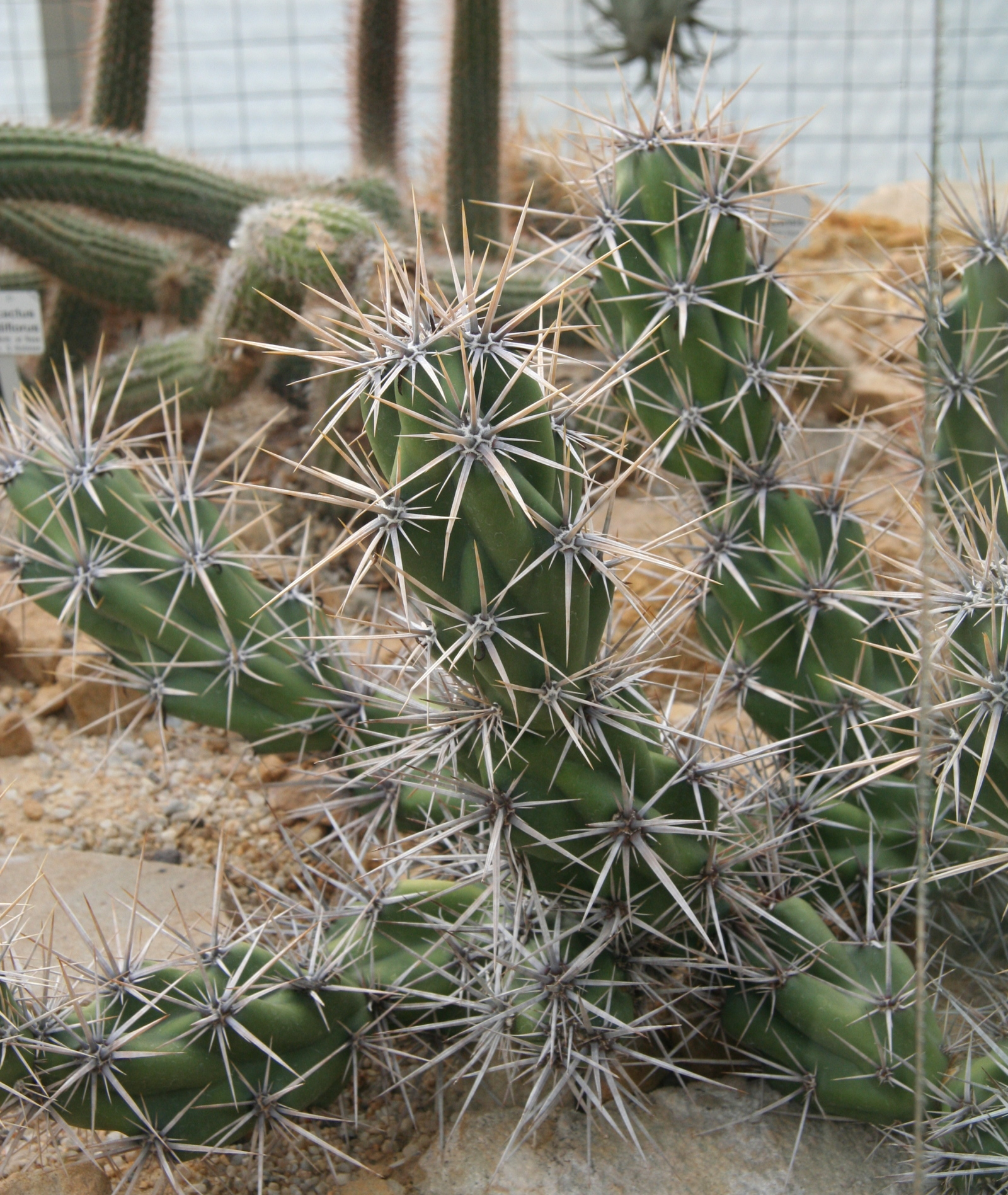

Scientific classification
- Kingdom: Plantae
- Clade: Tracheophytes
- Clade: Angiosperms
- Clade: Eudicots
- Order: Caryophyllales
- Family: Cactaceae
- Genus: Opuntia
- Species: O. invicta

Binomial name
- Opuntia invicta Brandegee

= Opuntia invicta =

Species of cactus

Opuntia invicta is a native cactus endemic to lower elevations in Baja California, Mexico.
