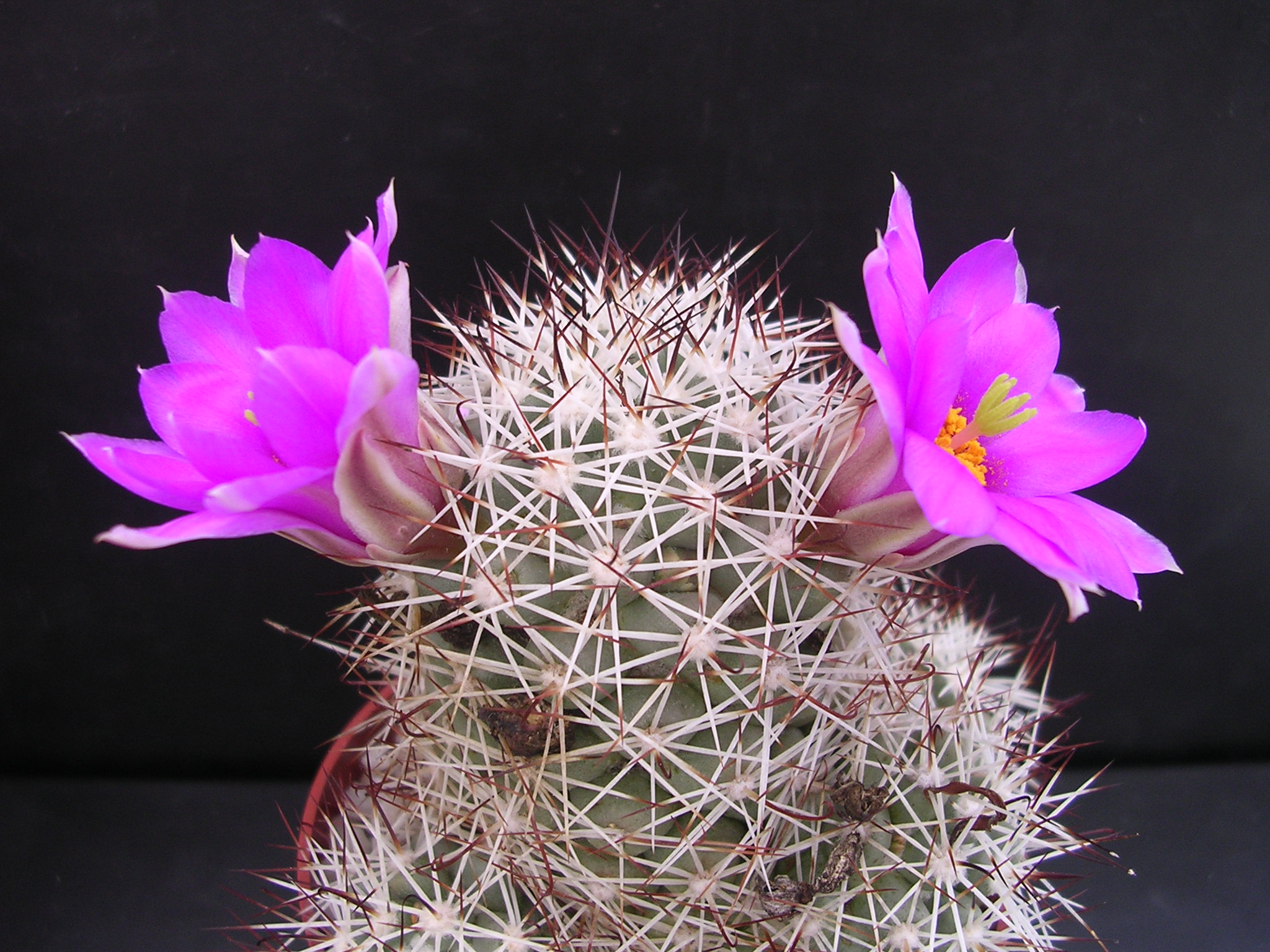

Conservation status
- Endangered (IUCN 3.1)

Scientific classification
- Kingdom: Plantae
- Clade: Tracheophytes
- Clade: Angiosperms
- Clade: Eudicots
- Order: Caryophyllales
- Family: Cactaceae
- Subfamily: Cactoideae
- Genus: Cochemiea
- Species: C. schumannii

Binomial name
- Cochemiea schumannii (Hildm.) P.B.Breslin & Majure 2021

Synonyms
- Bartschella schumannii (Hildm.) Britton & Rose 1923; Mammillaria schumannii Hildm. 1892; Mammillaria schumannii var. globosa R.Wolf 1987; Mammillaria schumannii subsp. globosa (R.Wolf) Lodé 2022; Mammillaria venusta K.Brandegee 1900

= Cochemiea schumannii =

Species of cactus

Cochemiea schumannii is a species of Cochemiea found in Mexico.

== Description ==
Cochemiea schumannii forms cushion-like structures, with spherical shoots that are gray-green, sometimes with a purple hue, and reach heights and diameters of 2 to 4 cm (0.79 to 1.57 in). The warts on the shoots are short, thick, and square at the base, lacking milky sap. Initially slightly woolly, the axillae later become glabrous. The central spine is typically one, occasionally 2 to 4, strong, pure white to dark brown, and 10 to 15 mm (0.39 to 0.59 in) long, usually with a hooked tip. The 9 to 15 marginal spines are needle-like, thin, white, with a dark tip, and 6 to 12 mm (0.24 to 0.47 in) long.

The bell-shaped, funnel-shaped, pink-red flowers are 30 to 40 mm (1.2 to 1.6 in) in diameter, with very short flower tubes. The lanceolate sepals are pointed, and the broadly lanceolate petals have a tapering tip and a spreading edge. The style is slender, and the green to brown-pink stigma has six parts. The almost dry, scarlet fruits are 15 to 20 mm (0.59 to 0.79 in) long and contain black seeds.

== Distribution ==
Cochemiea schumannii is found in the Cape region of Baja California Sur, Mexico.

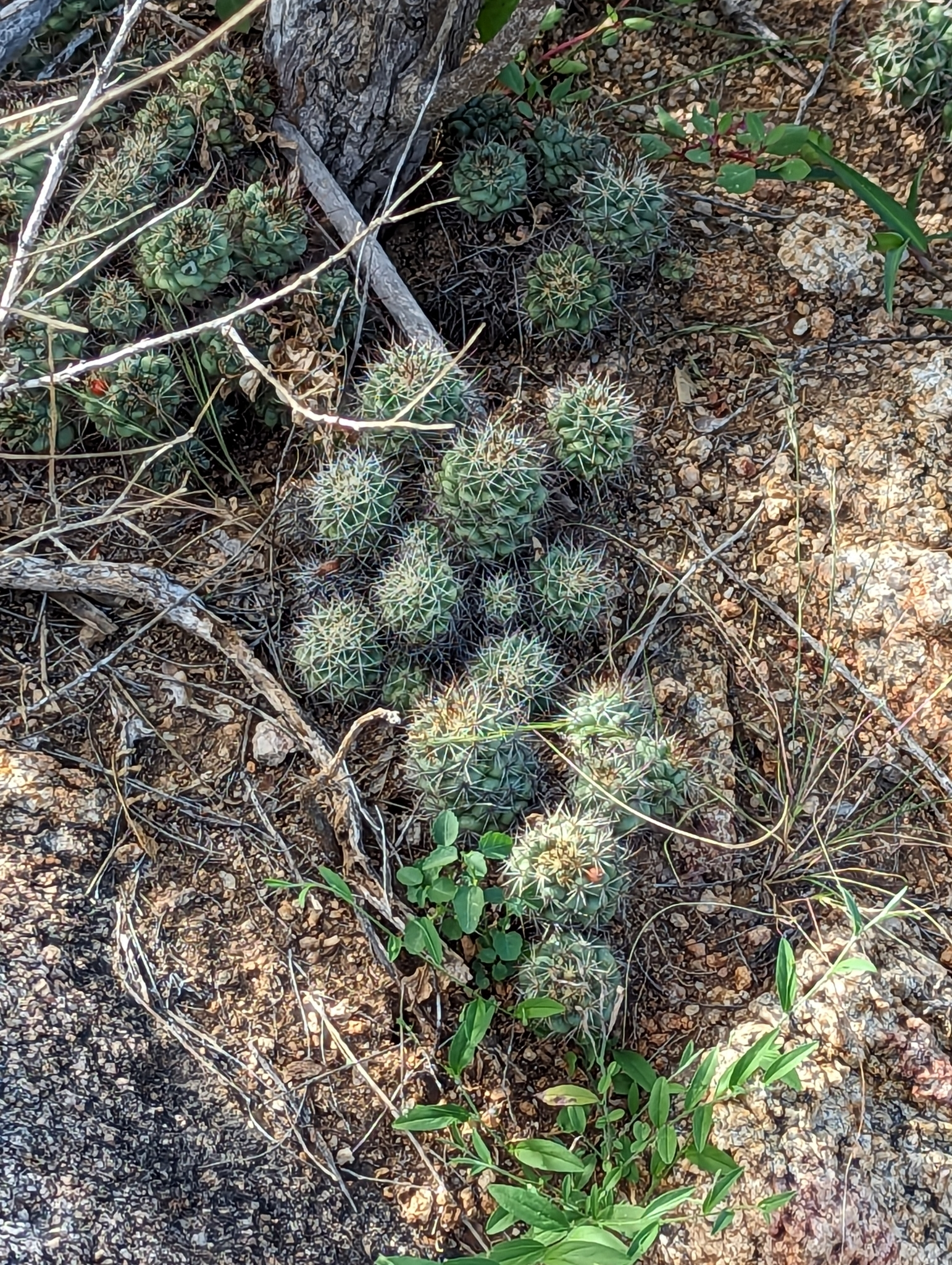
Plants growing in Cabo San Lucas, Baja California Sur

== Taxonomy ==
First described as Mammillaria schumannii in 1891 by Heinrich Hildmann, the specific epithet honors the German botanist and cactus specialist Karl Schumann. In 2021, Peter B. Breslin and Lucas C. Majure placed the species in the genus Cochemiea.
