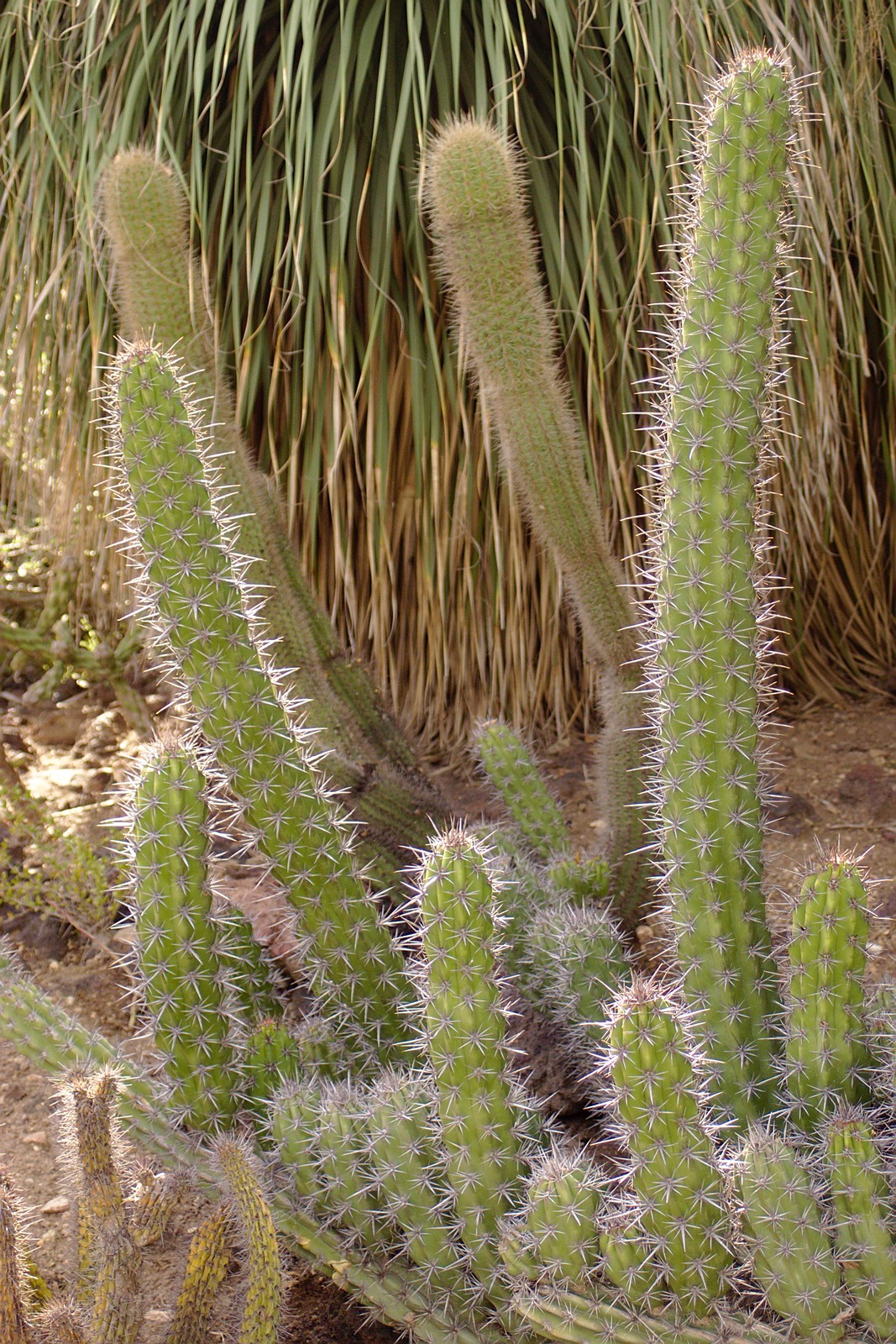

Conservation status
- Least Concern (IUCN 2.3)

Scientific classification
- Kingdom: Plantae
- Clade: Embryophytes
- Clade: Tracheophytes
- Clade: Spermatophytes
- Clade: Angiosperms
- Clade: Eudicots
- Order: Caryophyllales
- Family: Cactaceae
- Subfamily: Cactoideae
- Genus: Stenocereus
- Species: S. gummosus

Binomial name
- Stenocereus gummosus (Engelm.) A.C. Gibson & K.E. Horak 1978

Synonyms
- Cereus pfersdorffii Hildm. ex K.Schum. 1897; Lemaireocereus cumengei Britton & Rose 1909; Lemaireocereus gummosus Britton & Rose 1909; Rathbunia gummosa f. cristata P.V.Heath 1992; Rathbunia gummosa f. tortuosa P.V.Heath 1992; Stenocereus gummosus f. cristatus (P.V.Heath) P.V.Heath 1996; Stenocereus gummosus f. tortuosus (P.V.Heath) P.V.Heath 1996

= Stenocereus gummosus =

Species of cactus

Stenocereus gummosus is a flowering plant in the family Cactaceae that is found in Baja California, Mexico at elevations of 9 to 134 meters

== Description ==
Stenocereus gummosus is a shrub-like plant with sparsely branched trunks reaching a height of up to 3 meters, longer trunks bend due to their weight. Stems are green-gray with 8-9 ribs. Areoles are large with 3-6 central spines and 8-12 radial spines.

The flowers of Stenocereus gummosus are white to pink or purple, up to 20 cm long with a diameter of up to 8 cm, its fruits are in the form of small oranges of light red color. The main flowering period is summer, but flowering can also occur at other times of the year after rainfall. Fruits are subglobose and red or purple pericarp, with red flesh. The brown seeds reach a length of 2.5 mm.

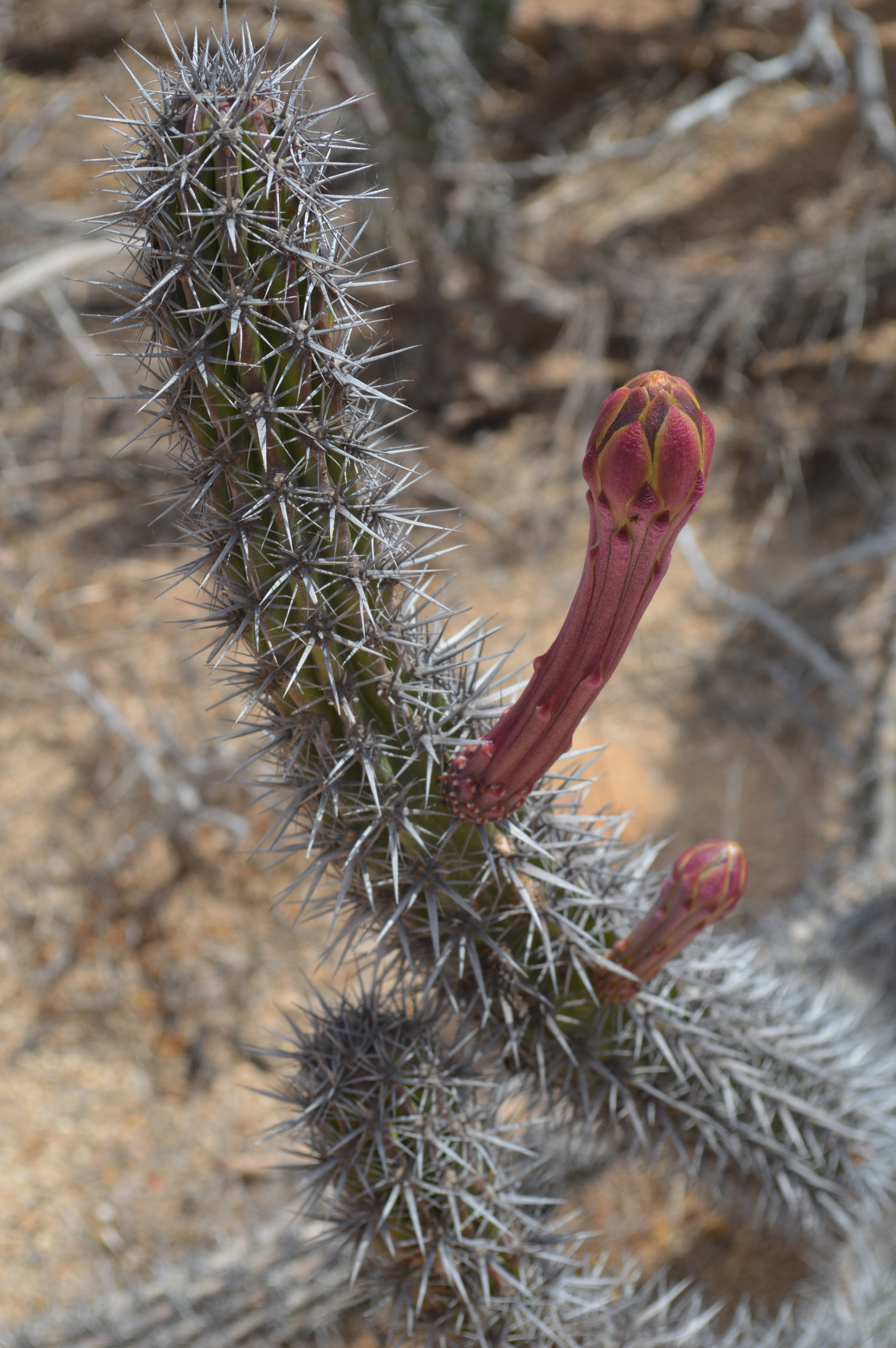
Flower buds

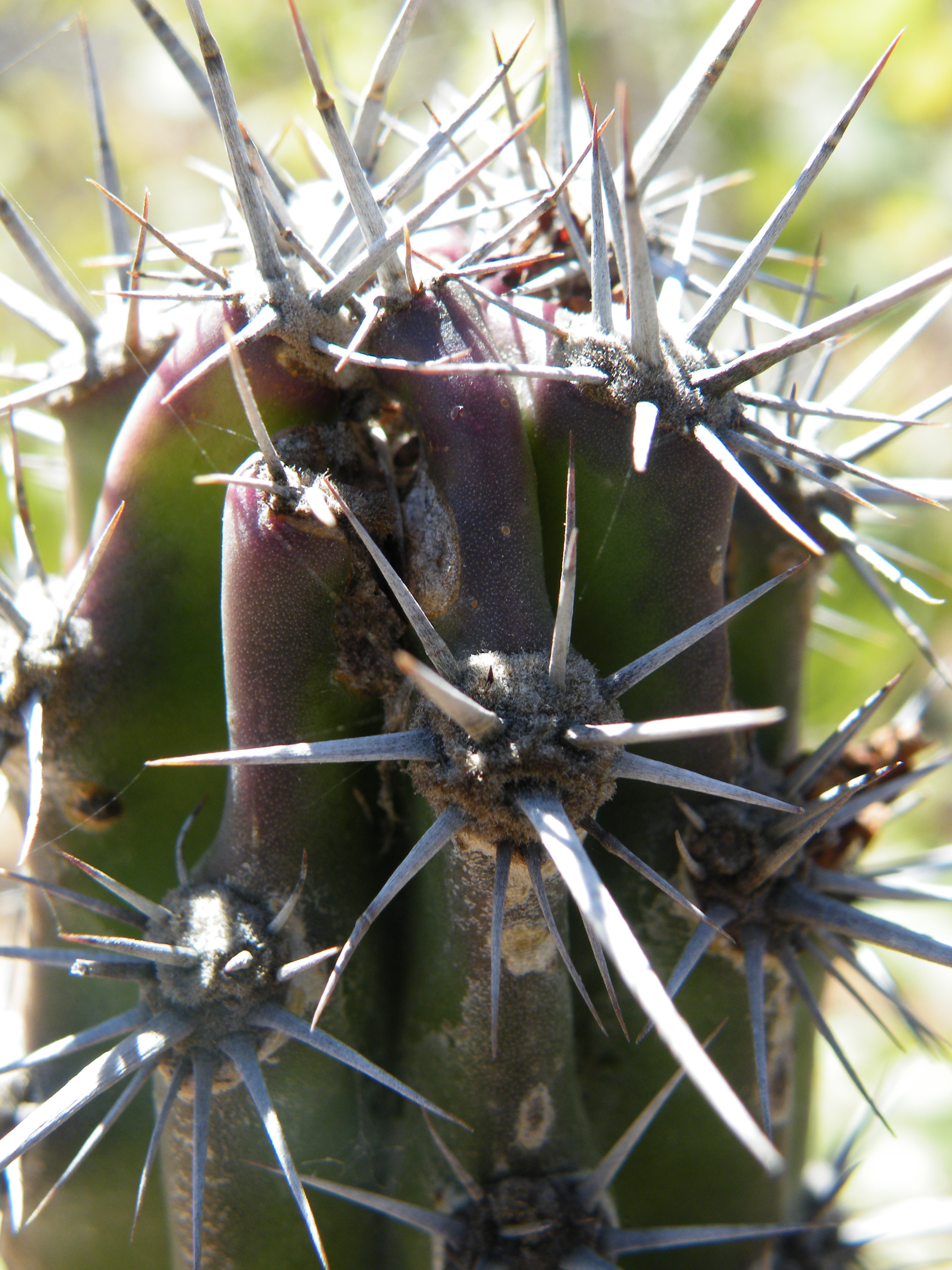
Areoles and spines

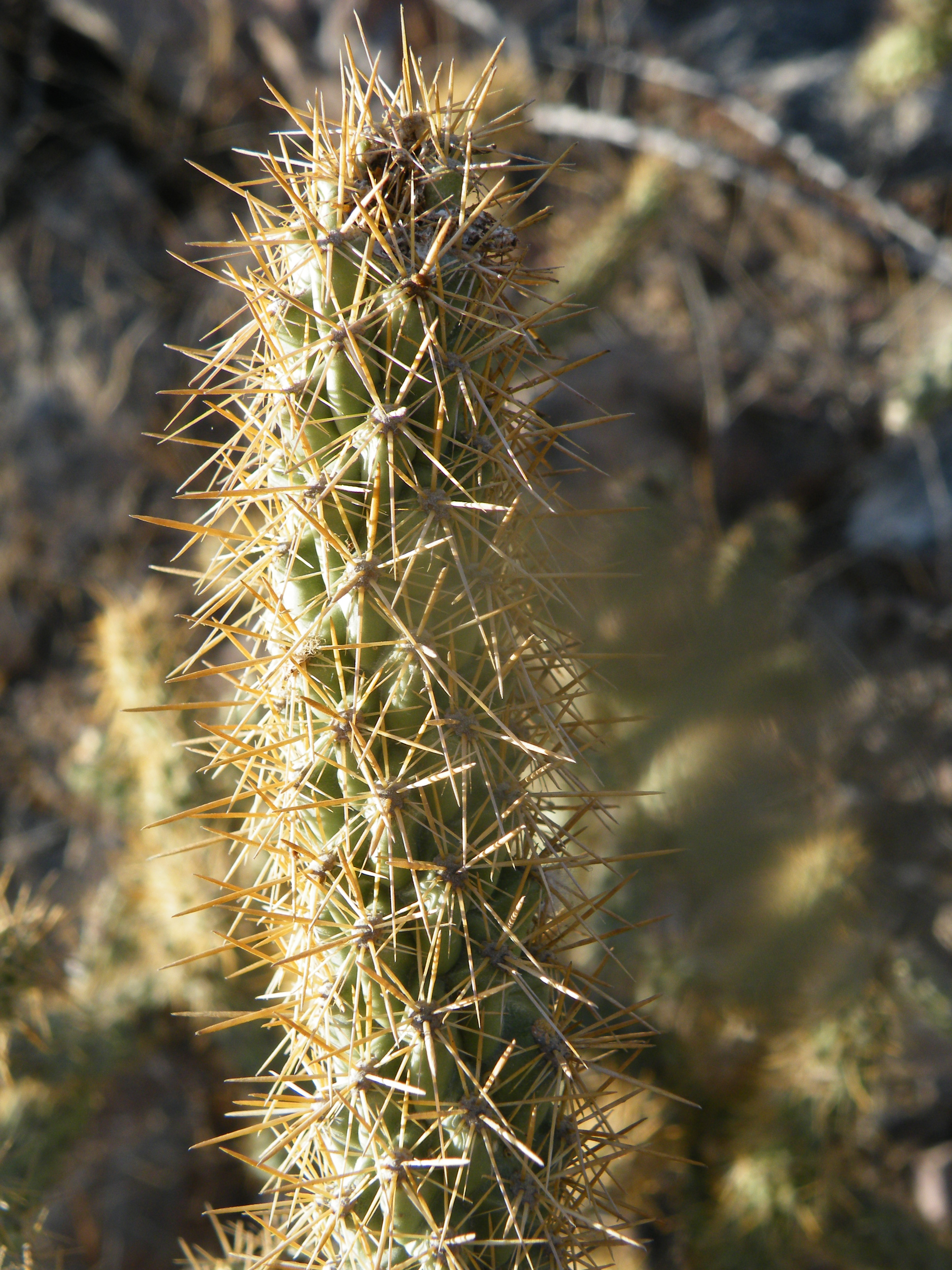
tip of stem

== Distribution ==
Stenocereus gummosus is widespread in the Baja California peninsula but absent at higher elevations and in the arid Northeast in coastal and scrublands in valleys and slopes. Other deposits can be found on offshore islands and in the coastal area of the Sonoran Desert in 0 and 850 meters. Plants are found growing along with Bursera microphylla, Neltuma articulata, Larrea divaricata, Fouquieria diguetii, Lophocereus schottii, Myrtillocactus cochal, Olneya tesota,Stenocereus thurberi, and Pachycereus pringlei. Seeds are dispersed by birds and lizards such as Melanerpes uropygialis, Dipsosaurus dorsalis and Ctenosaura hemilopha.

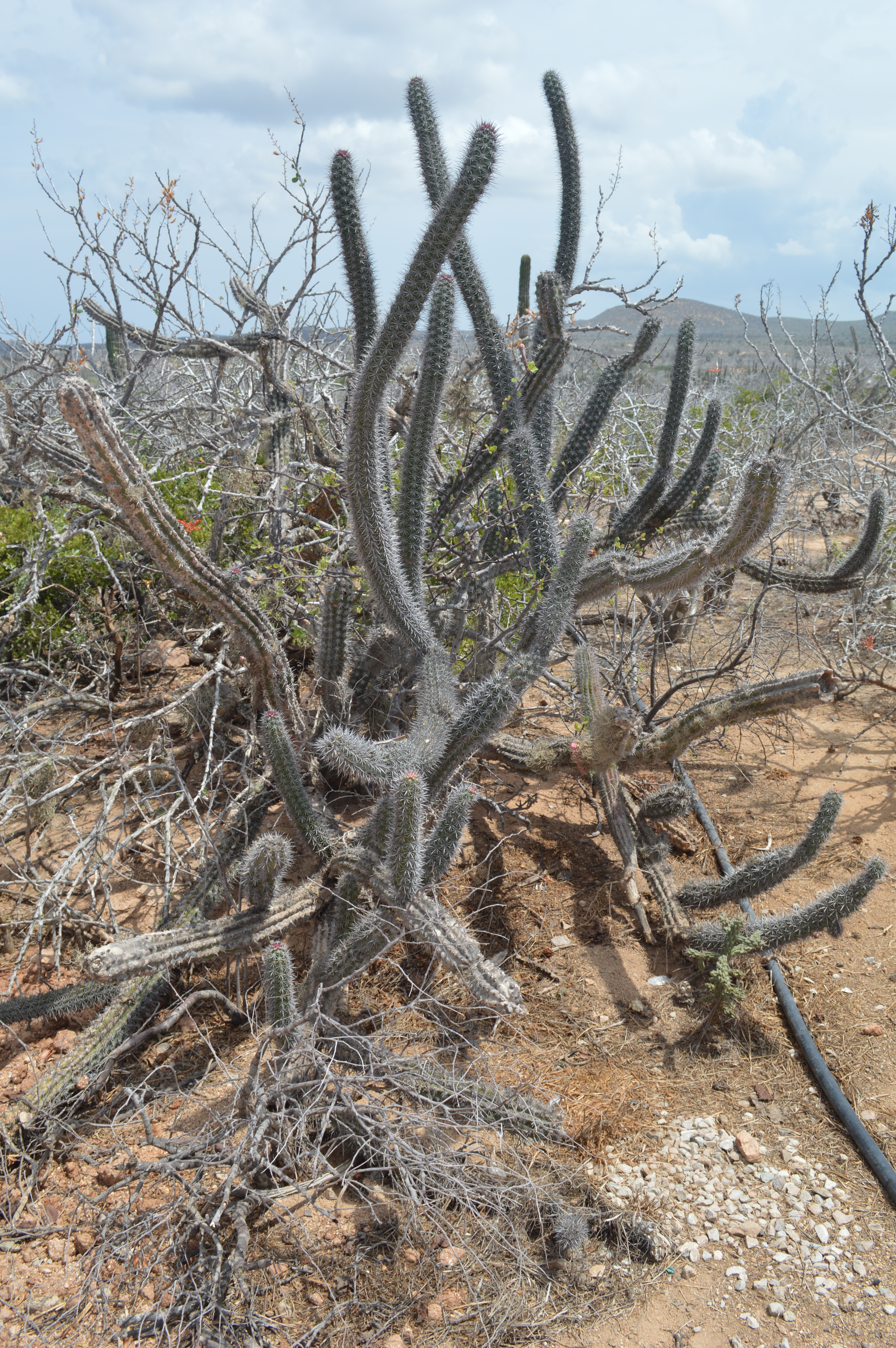
Plant growing in habitat in Rancho Punta San Cristobal, Los Cabos, Baja California Sur

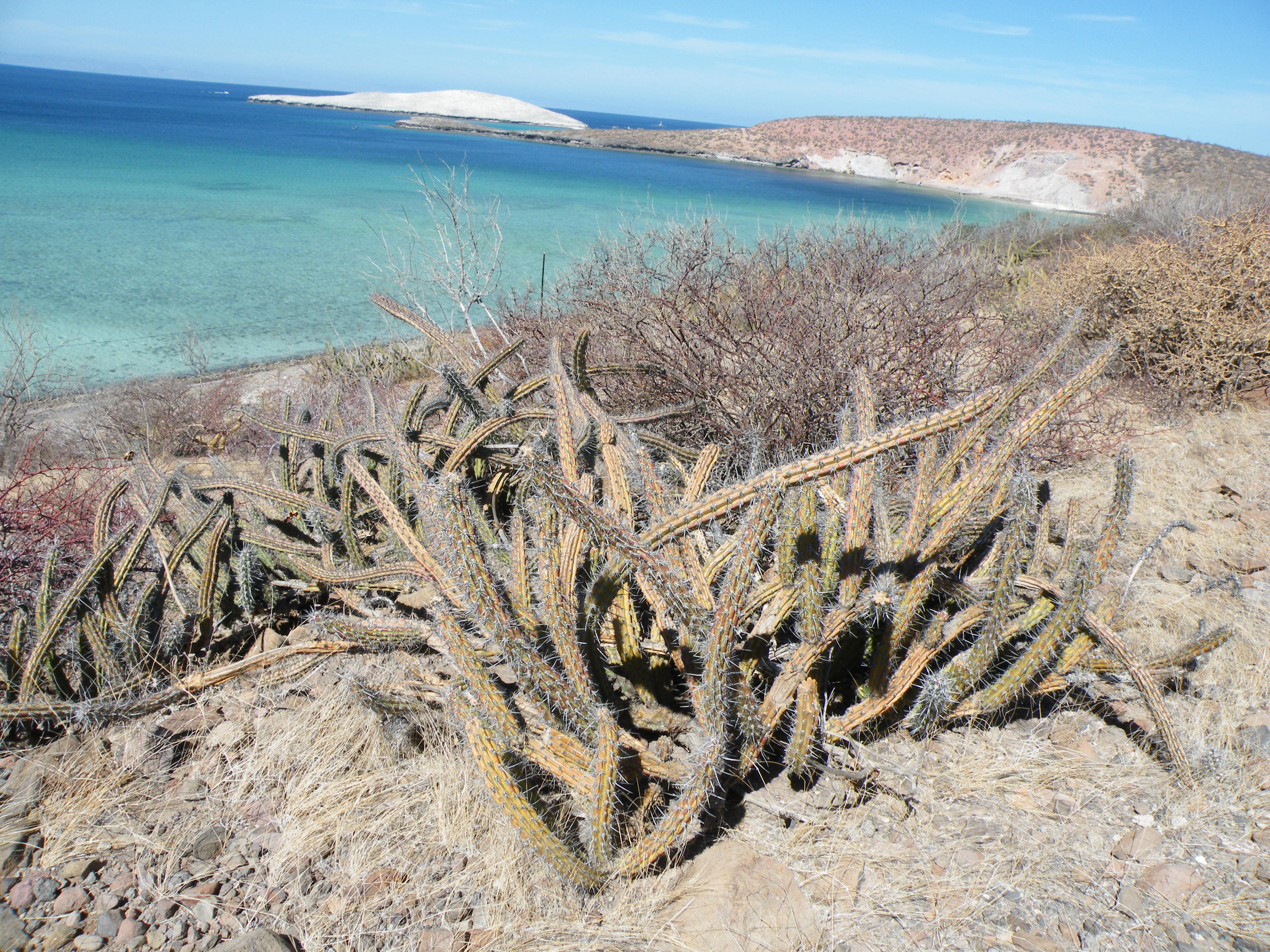
Plant growing in Pichilingue, Baja California Sur

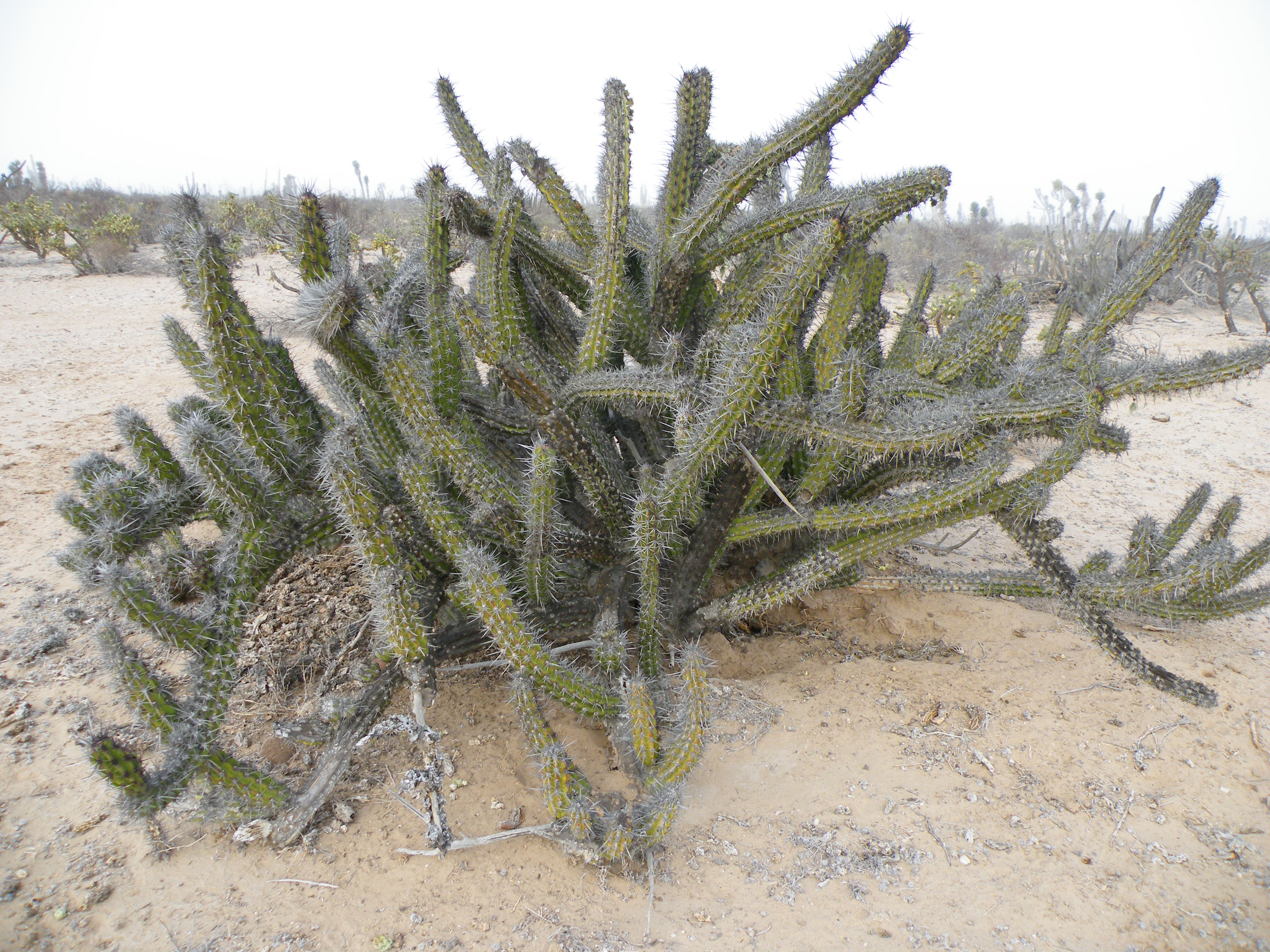
Plant growing in Viscaino, Baja California Sur

== Taxonomy ==
The first description as Cereus gummosus was in 1889 by Townshend Stith Brandegee. Arthur Charles Gibson and Karl E. Horak placed the species in the genus Stenocereus in 1979. Other nomenclature synonyms include Lemaireocereus gummosus (Engelm. ex Brandegee) Britton & Rose (1909), Machaerocereus gummosus (Engelm. ex Brandegee) Britton & Rose (1920), and Rathbunia gummosa (Engelm. ex Brandegee) P.V.Heath (1992).
