= Fishhook cactus =

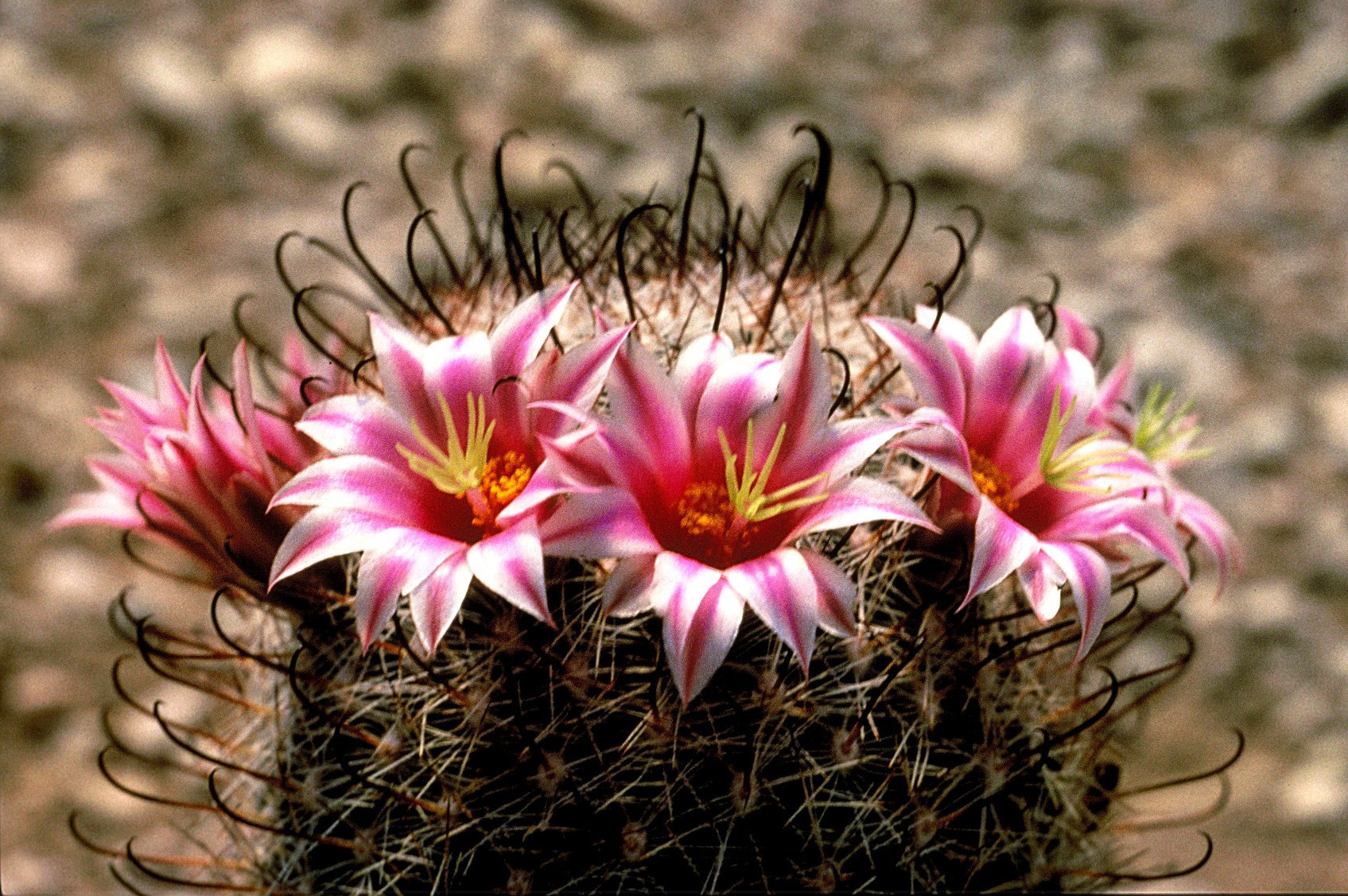
A fishhook Mammillaria

Fishhook cactus is a common name for any hook-spined species of the genera Mammillaria, Echinomastus, Sclerocactus, or Cochemiea. They are small cacti, usually growing up to 6-7 inches (20 cm) high, and are shaped similar to a barrel cactus. They are not to be confused with the fishhook barrel cactus (Ferocactus wislizenii) of the Sonoran and Chihuahuan Deserts. The Fishhook cactus is a large category of around 150 species.

Good places to see "fishhook" Mammillaria are the Sonoran Desert on the U.S. - Mexico border, and the Mesa Verde National Park. Often found growing in desert and rocky locations.

== Notable species ==
The genus Mammillaria also contains "pincushion" and other cacti. Some Mammillaria species have been reclassified into the genus Cochemiea.

- Cochemiea barbata – green fishhook cactus
- Cochemiea dioica – California fishhook cactus, strawberry cactus
- Cochemiea grahamii – Arizona fishhook cactus
  - Mammillaria grahamii var. oliviae – pitahayita
- Cochemiea tetrancistra – common fishhook cactus
- Cochemiea thornberi – Thornber's fishhook cactus
