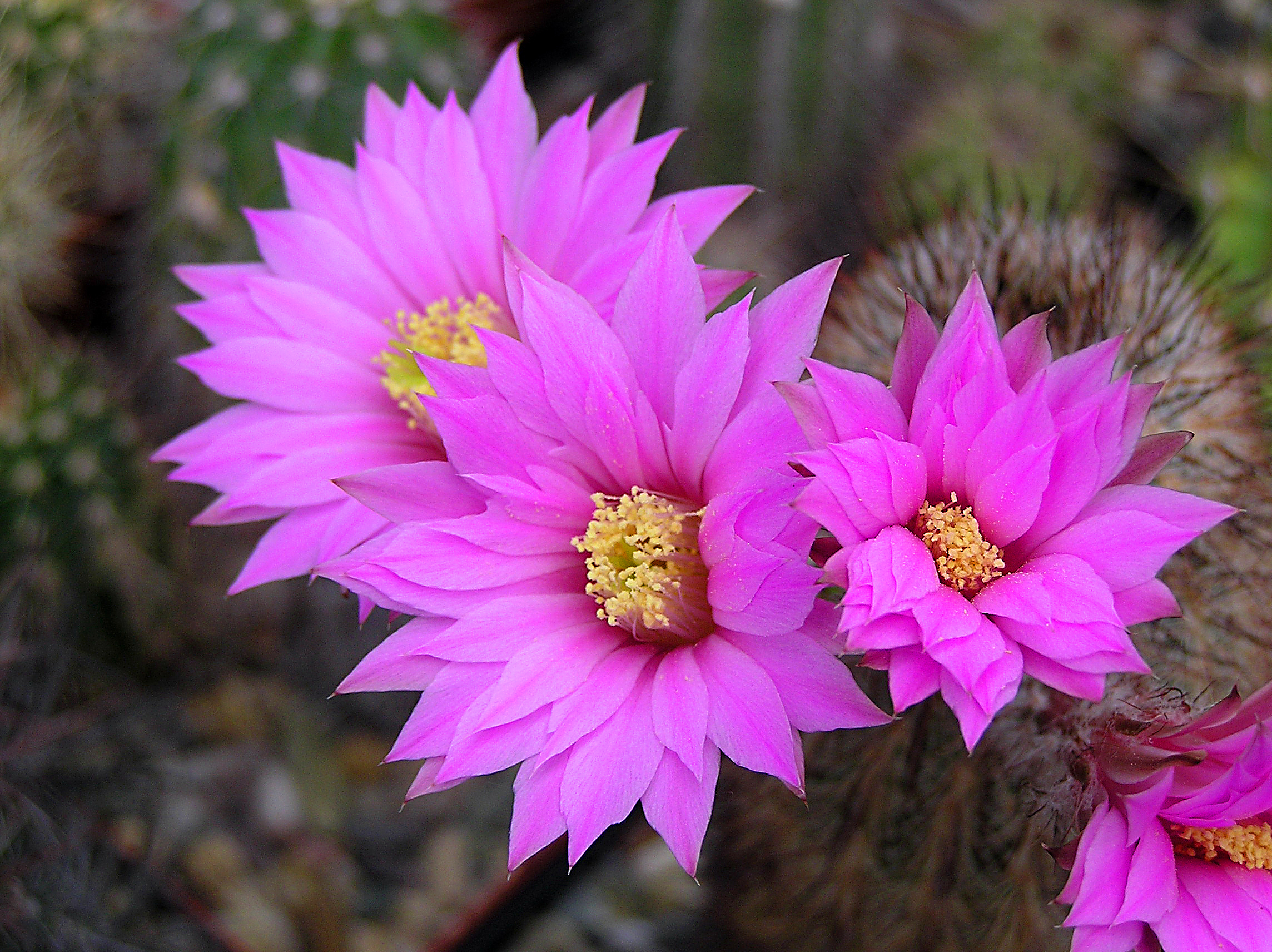

Conservation status
- Least Concern (IUCN 3.1)

Scientific classification
- Kingdom: Plantae
- Clade: Embryophytes
- Clade: Tracheophytes
- Clade: Angiosperms
- Clade: Eudicots
- Order: Caryophyllales
- Family: Cactaceae
- Subfamily: Cactoideae
- Genus: Echinocereus
- Species: E. laui

Binomial name
- Echinocereus laui G.Frank 1978

= Echinocereus laui =

Species of cactus

Echinocereus laui is a species of cactus native to Mexico.

== Description ==
Echinocereus laui forms clusters of up to 20 cylindrical shoots, each reaching up to 10 cm (3.9 in) in height and 4 cm (1.6 in) in diameter. These shoots have 14 to 16 low ribs with small cusps. The plant features four reddish-brown central spines, up to 3 cm (1.2 in) long, and 18 to 21 bristle-like white radial spines, 5 to 10 mm (0.20 to 0.39 in) long.

Its narrow, funnel-shaped pink flowers bloom near the tips of the shoots, measuring 3 to 6.2 cm (1.2 to 2.4 in) in length and 4 to 7.2 cm (1.6 to 2.8 in) in diameter. The spherical fruits are brownish-green, covered with wool and thin brown thorns.

== Distribution ==
Echinocereus laui is found in oak forests, rock outcrops, and grasslands in eastern Sonora and western Chihuahua in Mexico, within the Sierra Madre Occidental at elevations of 1,480 to 1,800 m (4,860 to 5,910 ft). It is found growing along with Cochemiea barbata.

== Taxonomy ==
Gerhard R. W. Frank first described the species in 1978, naming it after Alfred Bernhard Lau, its discoverer.
