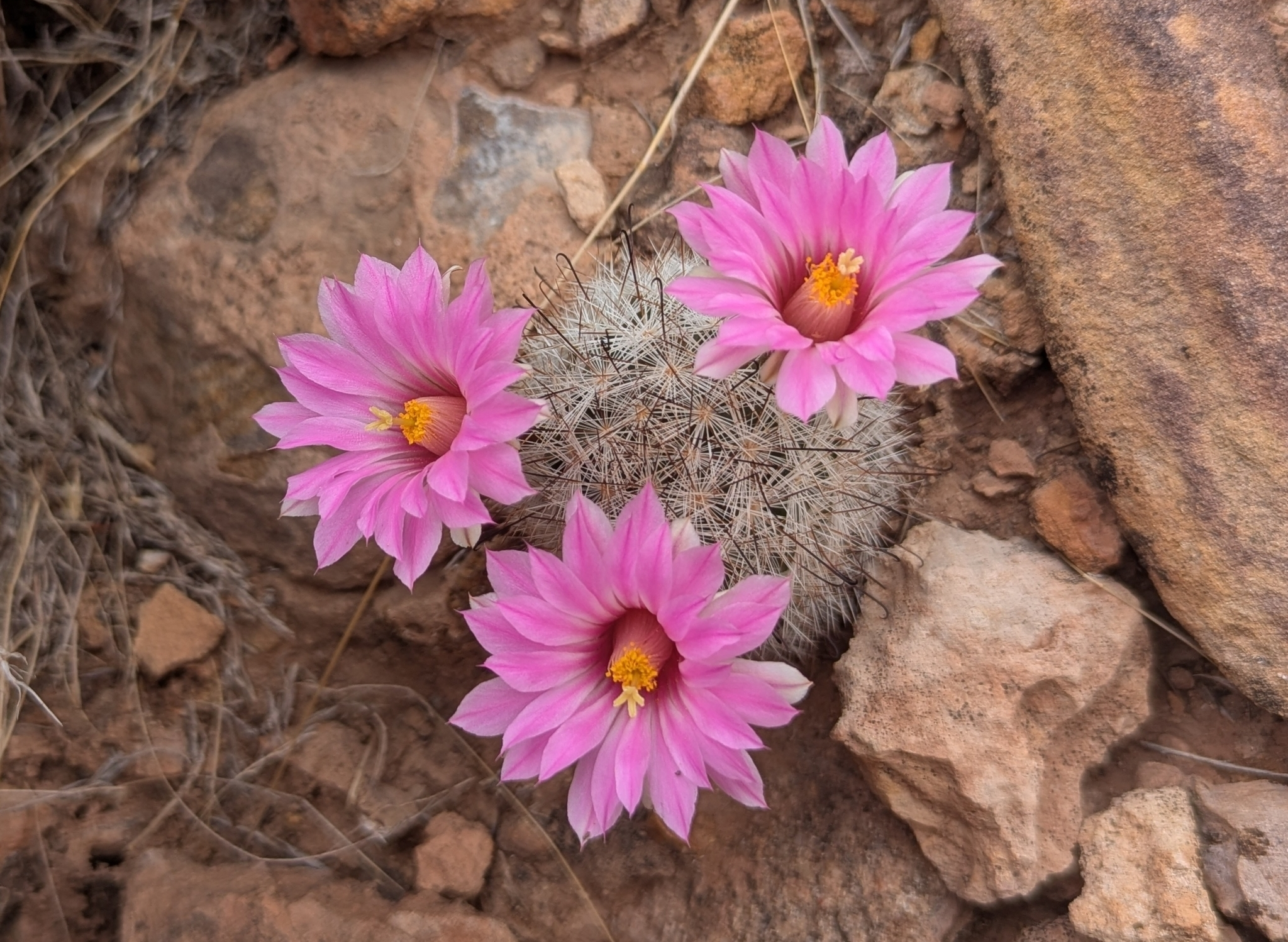

Conservation status
- Least Concern (IUCN 3.1)

Scientific classification
- Kingdom: Plantae
- Clade: Tracheophytes
- Clade: Angiosperms
- Clade: Eudicots
- Order: Caryophyllales
- Family: Cactaceae
- Subfamily: Cactoideae
- Genus: Cochemiea
- Species: C. tetrancistra

Binomial name
- Cochemiea tetrancistra (Engelm.) P.B.Breslin & Majure

Synonyms
- Mammillaria tetrancistra Engelm.

= Cochemiea tetrancistra =

Species of cactus

Cochemiea tetrancistra is a species of fishhook cactus known by the common name common fishhook cactus. It is native to the Mojave and Sonoran Deserts of northern Mexico and the southwestern United States, where it grows in a variety of desert habitat types.

== Description ==
This cactus generally has a single cylindrical stem a few cm wide and up to about 25 cm (9.8 in) tall and 3 to 8 cm (1.2 to 3.1 in) in diameter with tuberous roots. The cylindrical warts do not produce milky juice, and the axillae are covered with bristles. Each cluster of spines is made up of 3 or 4 dark, hooked central spines and many straight, white radial spines, the longest reaching 2.5 cm (0.98 in) in length. The 30 to 60 radial spines are hair-like, arranged in two rows, white with dark tips, and 6 to 10 mm (0.24 to 0.39 in) long. The flower is 2 to 4 cm (0.79 to 1.57 in) wide and pink to lavender in color. The fruit is red, shiny, 1.2 cm (0.47 in) long and fleshy and contains many black seeds coated in corky arils.

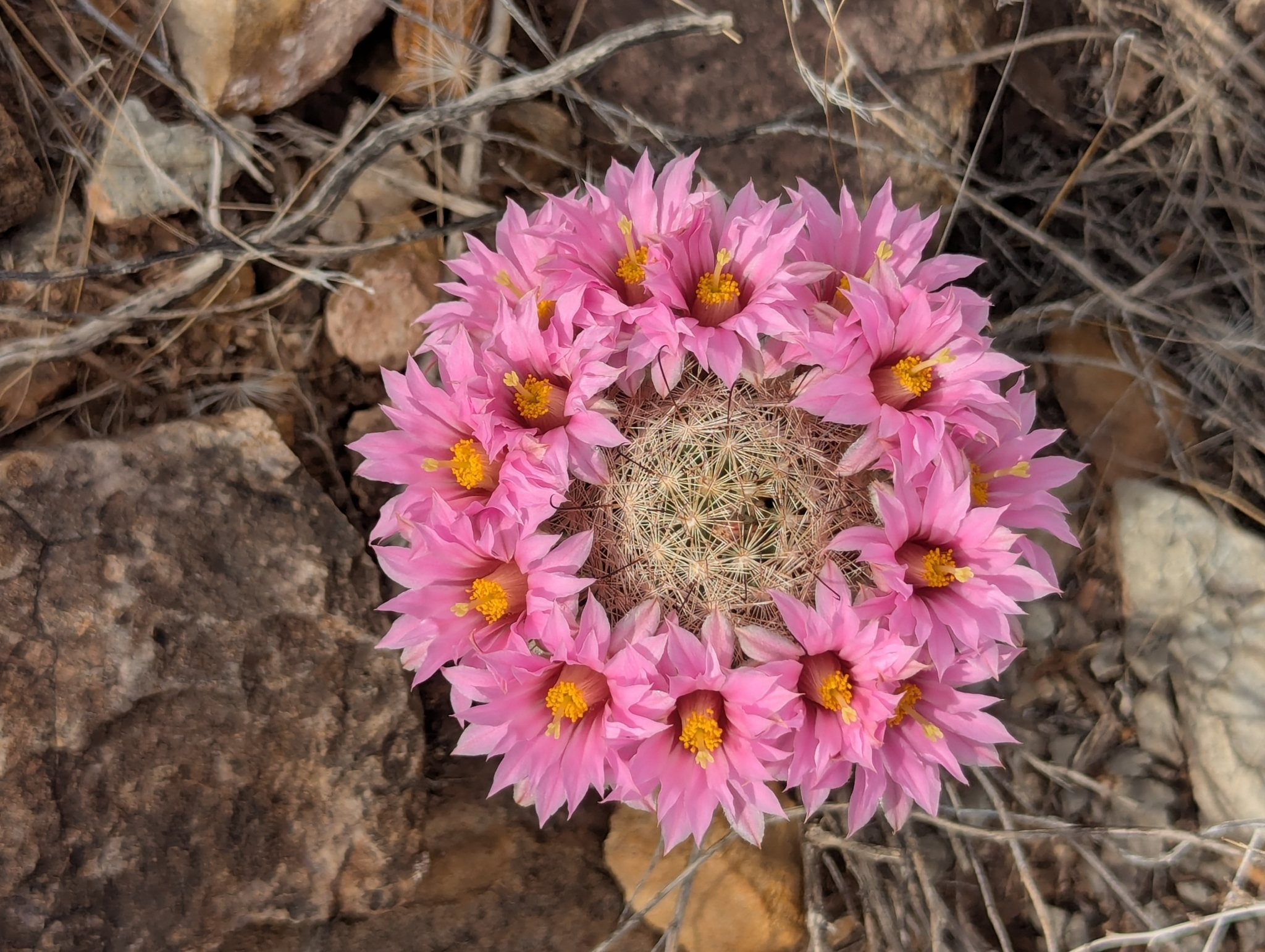
Flower of Cochemiea tetrancistra

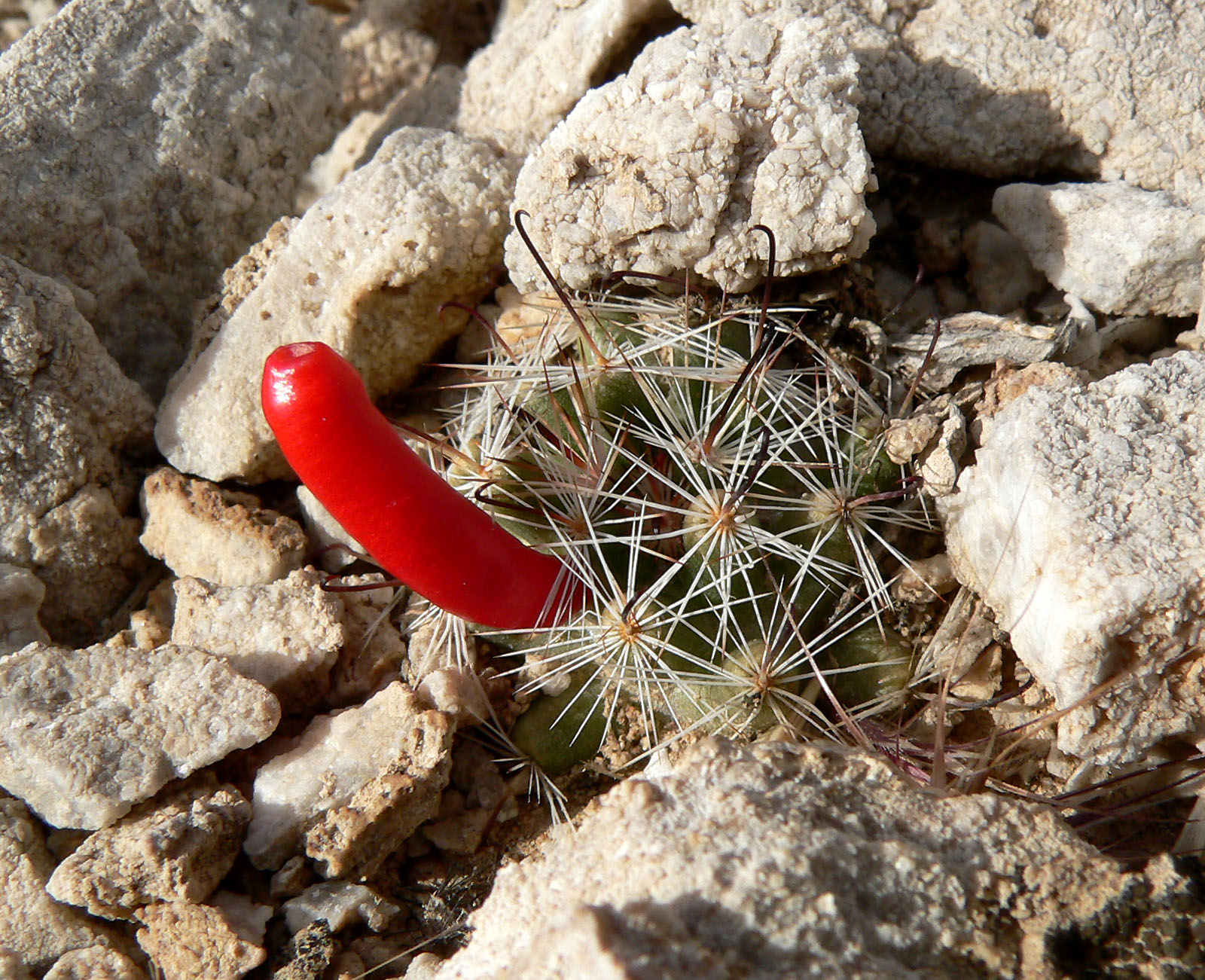
Fruit

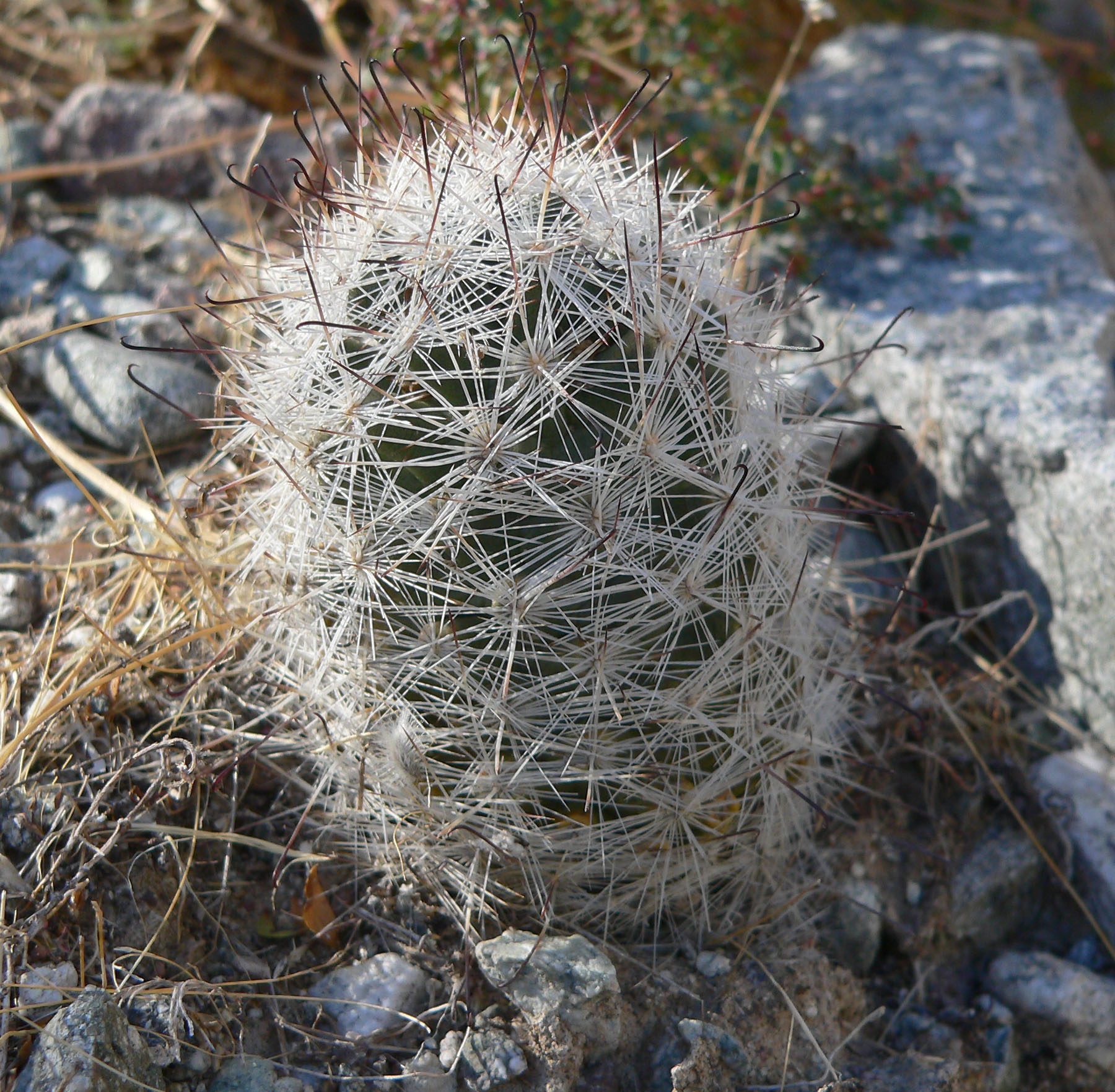
Plant

== Distribution ==
Cochemiea tetrancistra is found in California, Arizona, Nevada, Utah, and the Mexican states of Baja California and Sonora at elevations of 100 to 1500 meters.

== Taxonomy ==
Originally described as Mammillaria tetrancistra by George Engelmann in 1852, the name tetrancistra comes from Greek words for 'four' and 'hook,' referring to the hooked central spines. In 2021, Peter B. Breslin and Lucas C. Majure reclassified it into the genus Cochemiea.

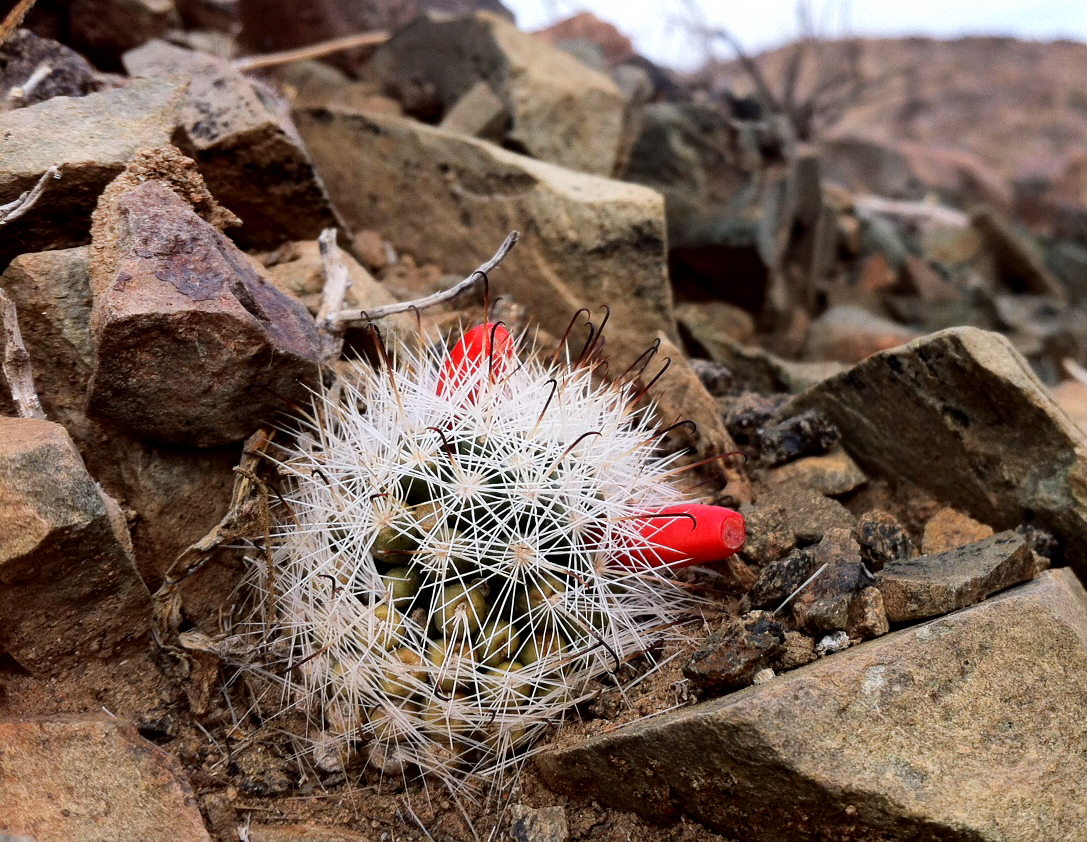
Plants growing in habitat southern section of the Mojave National Preserve

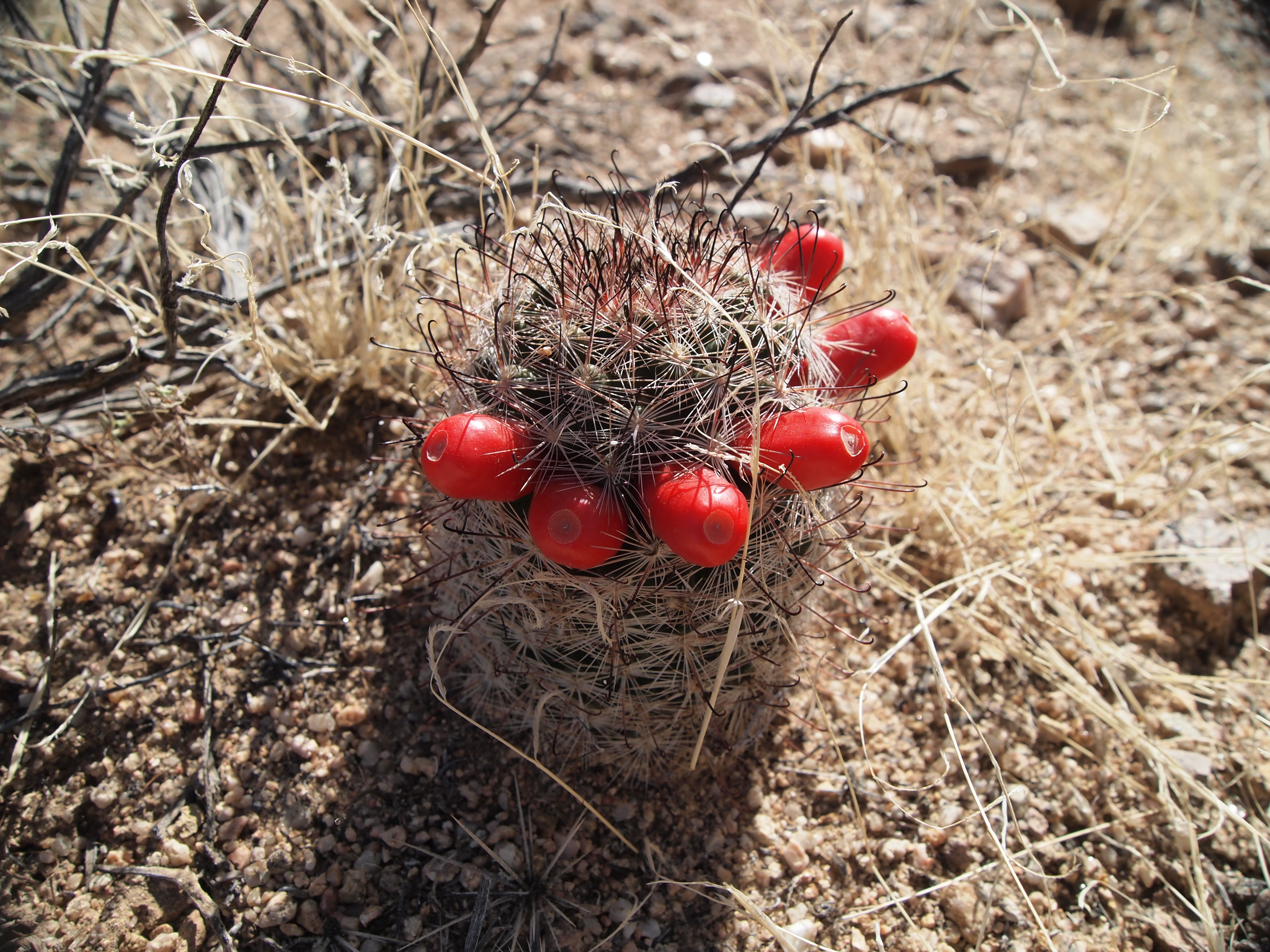
Plant growing in Joshua Tree National Park

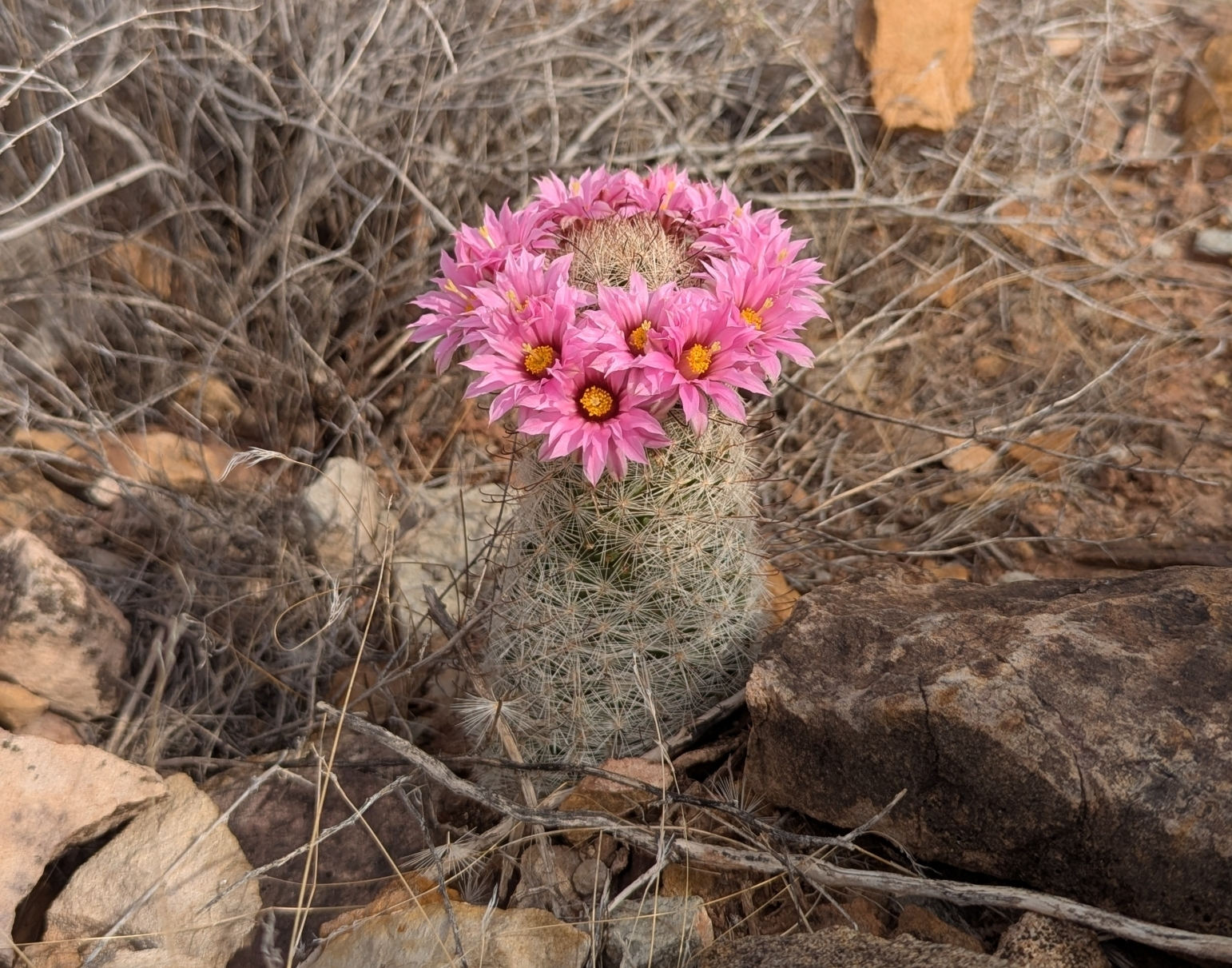
Plant blooming in habitat in Washington, Utah
