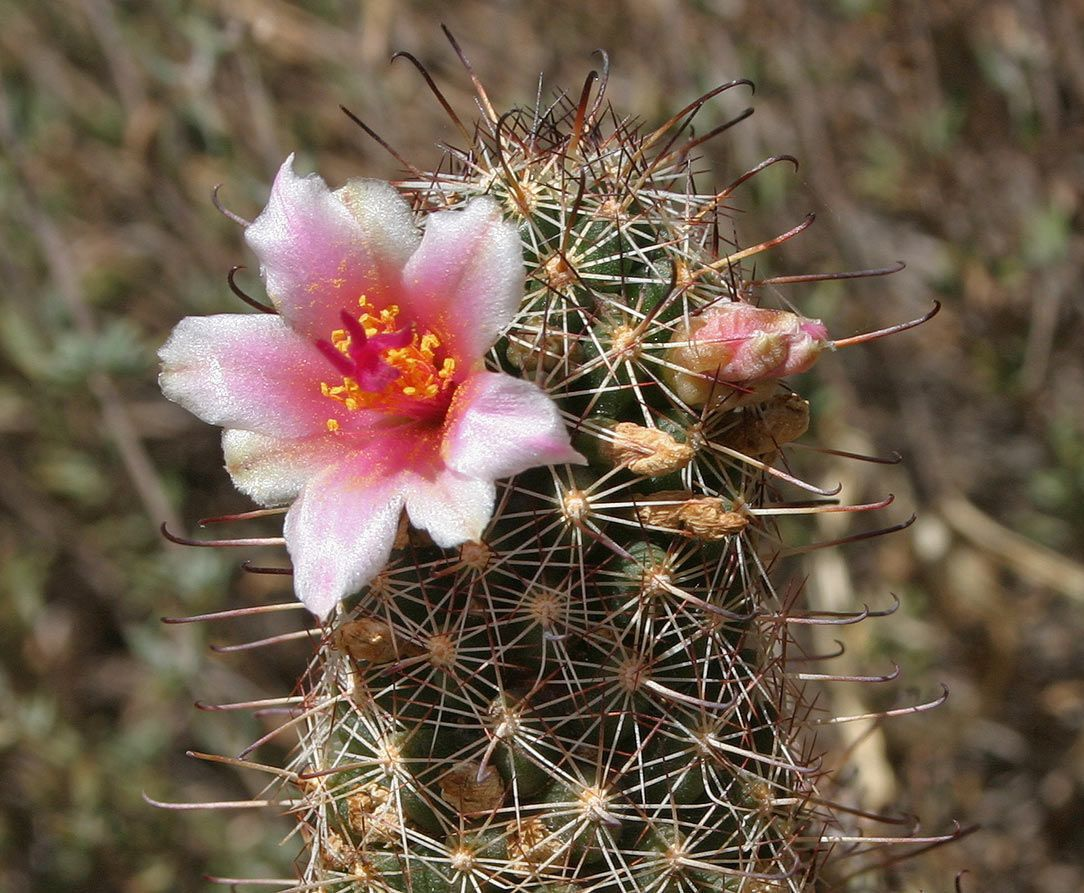

Conservation status
- Least Concern (IUCN 3.1)

- Apparently Secure (NatureServe)

Scientific classification
- Kingdom: Plantae
- Clade: Tracheophytes
- Clade: Angiosperms
- Clade: Eudicots
- Order: Caryophyllales
- Family: Cactaceae
- Subfamily: Cactoideae
- Genus: Cochemiea
- Species: C. thornberi

Binomial name
- Cochemiea thornberi (Orcutt) P.B.Breslin & Majure

Synonyms
- Mammillaria thornberi Orcutt; Chilita thornberi (Orcutt) Orcutt

= Cochemiea thornberi =

Species of cactus

Cochemiea thornberi is a species of cactus known by the common names Thornber's fishhook cactus and Thornber's nipple cactus. It is native to Arizona in the United States and Sonora in Mexico.

== Description ==
This plant has numerous branches that all root in the ground, forming a clump of rooted stems all belonging to one plant. The stems are cylindrical and usually measure up to 10 centimeters tall, but known to reach 30. They are up to 3.5 centimeters wide. There are up to 21 bristle-like radial spines on each areole and one to three hooked central spines. The flower is up to 3 centimeters wide and has white or pink inner tepals with pink midstripes. The flowers bloom most often after heavy rainfall. The fruit is bright red and up to 1.5 centimeters long. It is edible. It contains black seeds.

== Distribution ==
This plant is associated with nurse plants. It often grows beneath the branches of Ambrosia dumosa. The habitat is desert scrub. There are two main population areas in Arizona, one in the Avra Valley and Saguaro National Park and one on the Tohono O'odham Indian Reservation. This species was abundant in the Avra Valley up until the 1930s until a freeze which decimated the population. There are now a total of about 600 plants in all the populations together.

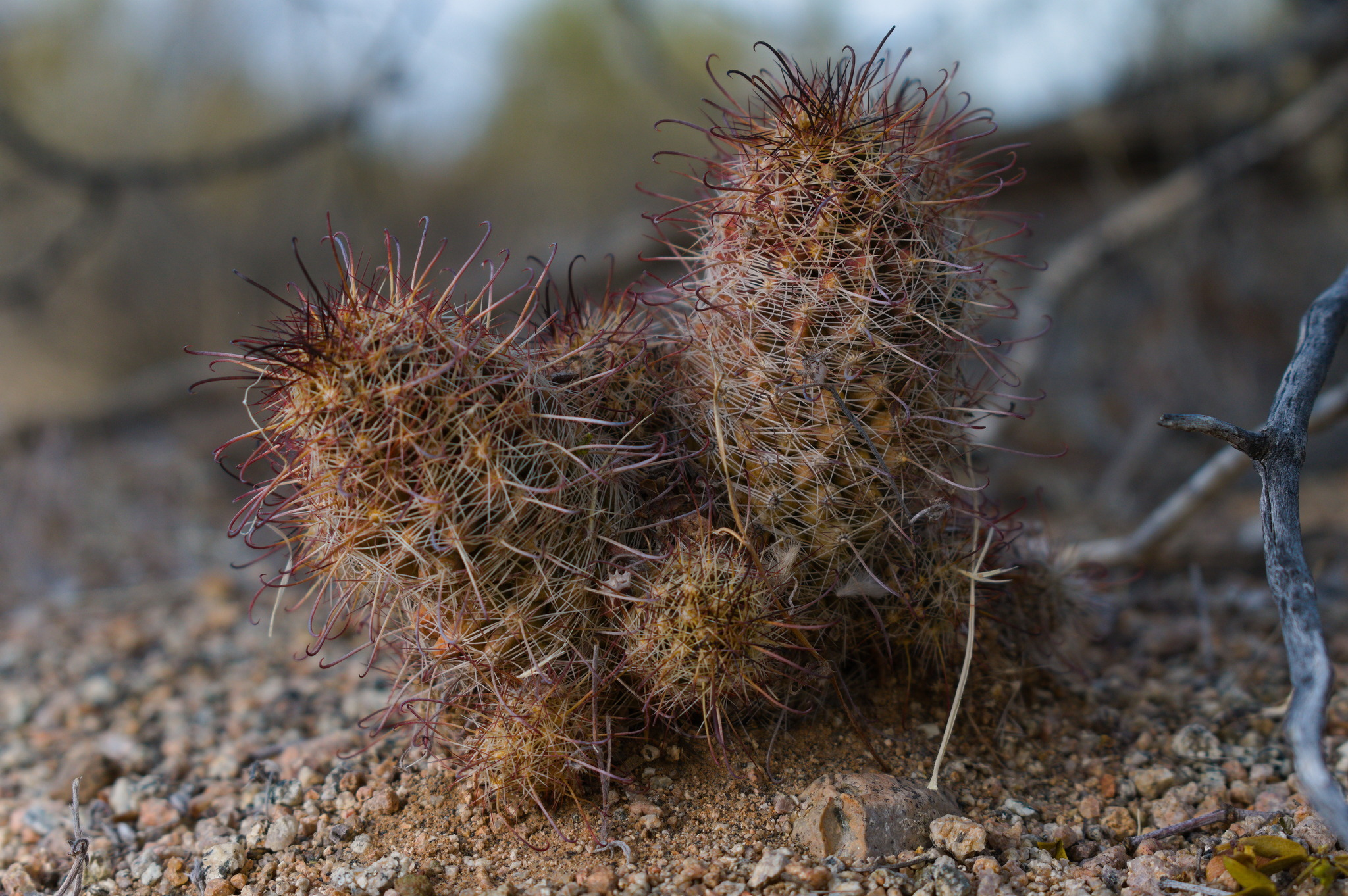
Plants growing in habitat in the United States

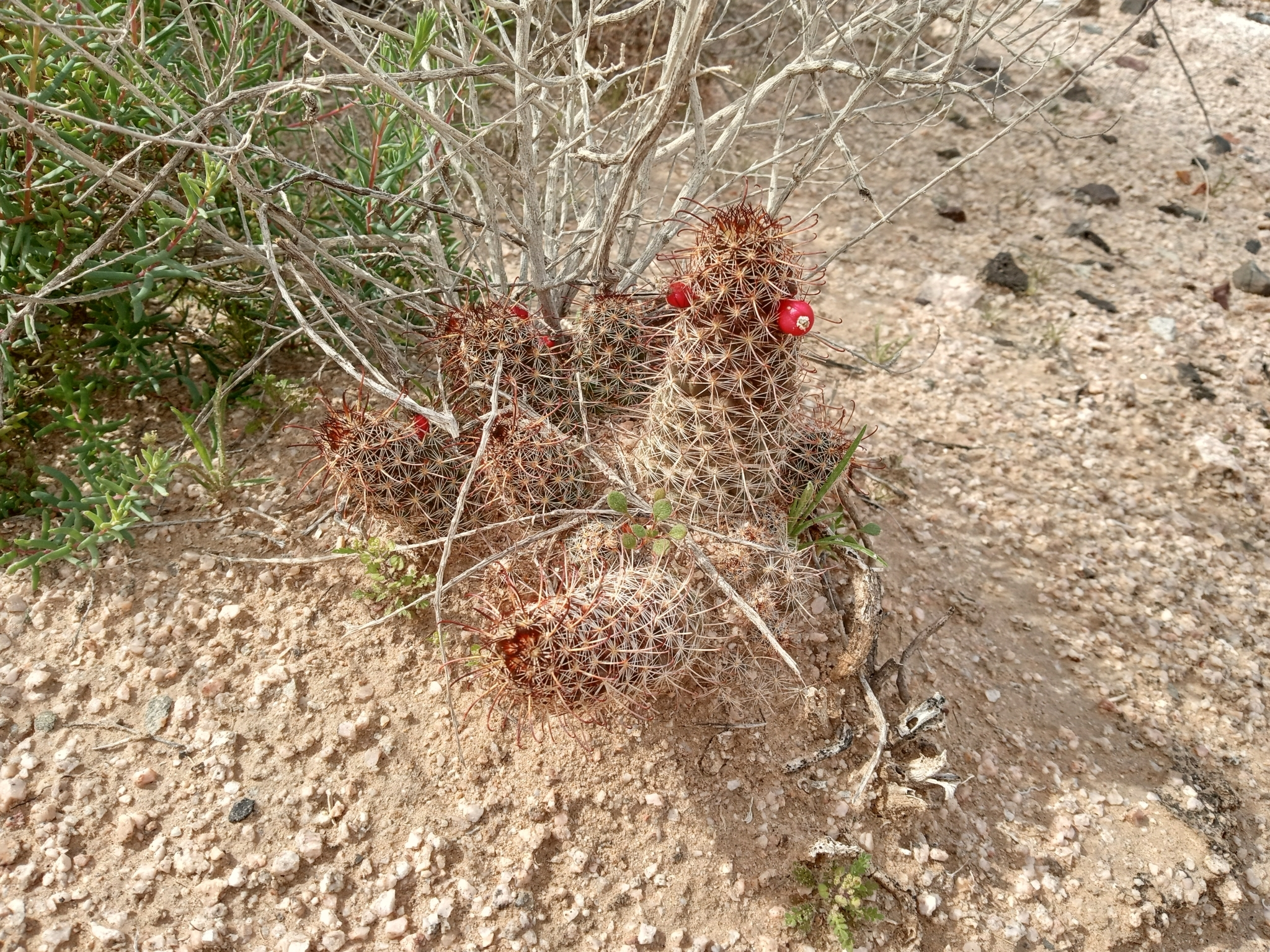
Plants fruiting in habitat in Arizona

== Taxonomy ==
This species was first described as Mammillaria thornberi in 1902 by Charles Russell Orcutt. Peter B. Breslin and Lucas C. Majure placed the species in the genus Cochemiea in 2021
