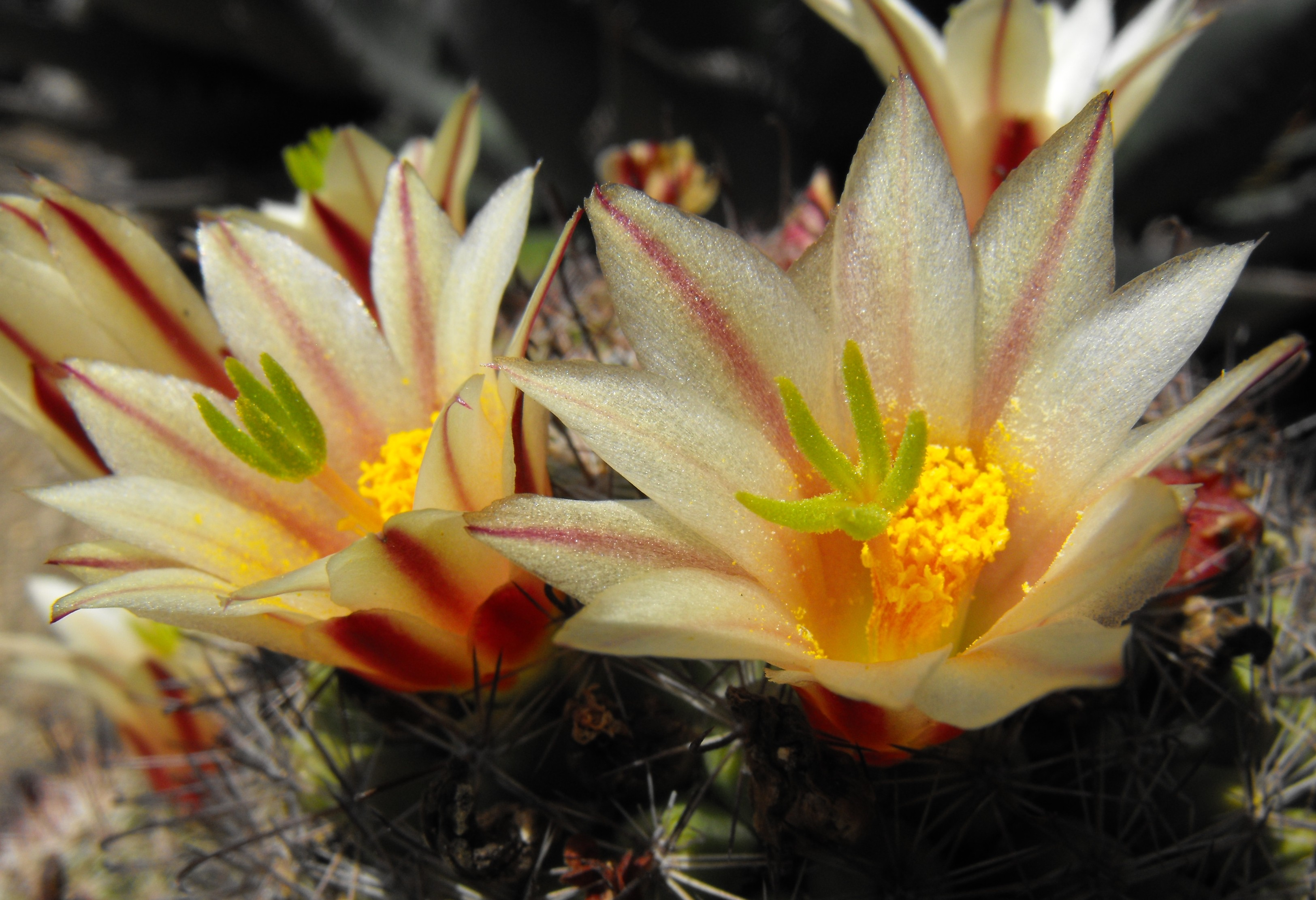

Conservation status
- Least Concern (IUCN 3.1)

Scientific classification
- Kingdom: Plantae
- Clade: Tracheophytes
- Clade: Angiosperms
- Clade: Eudicots
- Order: Caryophyllales
- Family: Cactaceae
- Subfamily: Cactoideae
- Genus: Cochemiea
- Species: C. dioica

Binomial name
- Cochemiea dioica (K.Brandegee) Doweld

Synonyms
- Chilita dioica (K.Brandegee) Buxb.; Ebnerella dioica (K.Brandegee) Buxb.; Mammillaria dioica K.Brandegee; Neomammillaria dioica (K.Brandegee) Britton & Rose

= Cochemiea dioica =

Species of cactus

Cochemiea dioica, also called the strawberry cactus, California fishhook cactus, strawberry pincushion or fishhook cactus, is a cactus species of the genus Cochemiea. Its common name in Spanish is biznaga llavina.

== Description ==
Cochemiea dioica possesses short, firm tubercles ending in the spines. Most of these spines are whitish and straight, but each tubercle has a longer central spine which is slightly curved and dark.

A single plant can bear both male and female flowers, from mid-spring to mid-summer. Some plants may produce bisexual flowers as well, thus totaling three types of flower on a single plant. The flowers are white to cream in color and range from 10 millimeters (0.4 inch) to 30 millimeters (1.2 inches) in length.

The fruits produced are bright red and ovoid, often with one end thicker than the other and are edible and tastes like a cross between a strawberry and a kiwi. The seeds are small (0.6 to 0.8 millimeters), black, and pitted.

== Distribution ==
The cactus is found in the western Colorado Desert scrub including in Anza-Borrego Desert State Park, and in Coastal sage scrub habitats of Southern California; and in coastal chaparral and Sonoran Desert habitats of Baja California and Baja California Sur states on the Baja California peninsula of México. It grows from 10–1,500 feet (3.0–457.2 m) in elevation.

Polyploid wild plants of this species have been found in Mexico. Both tetraploid and hexaploid varieties have been recorded.

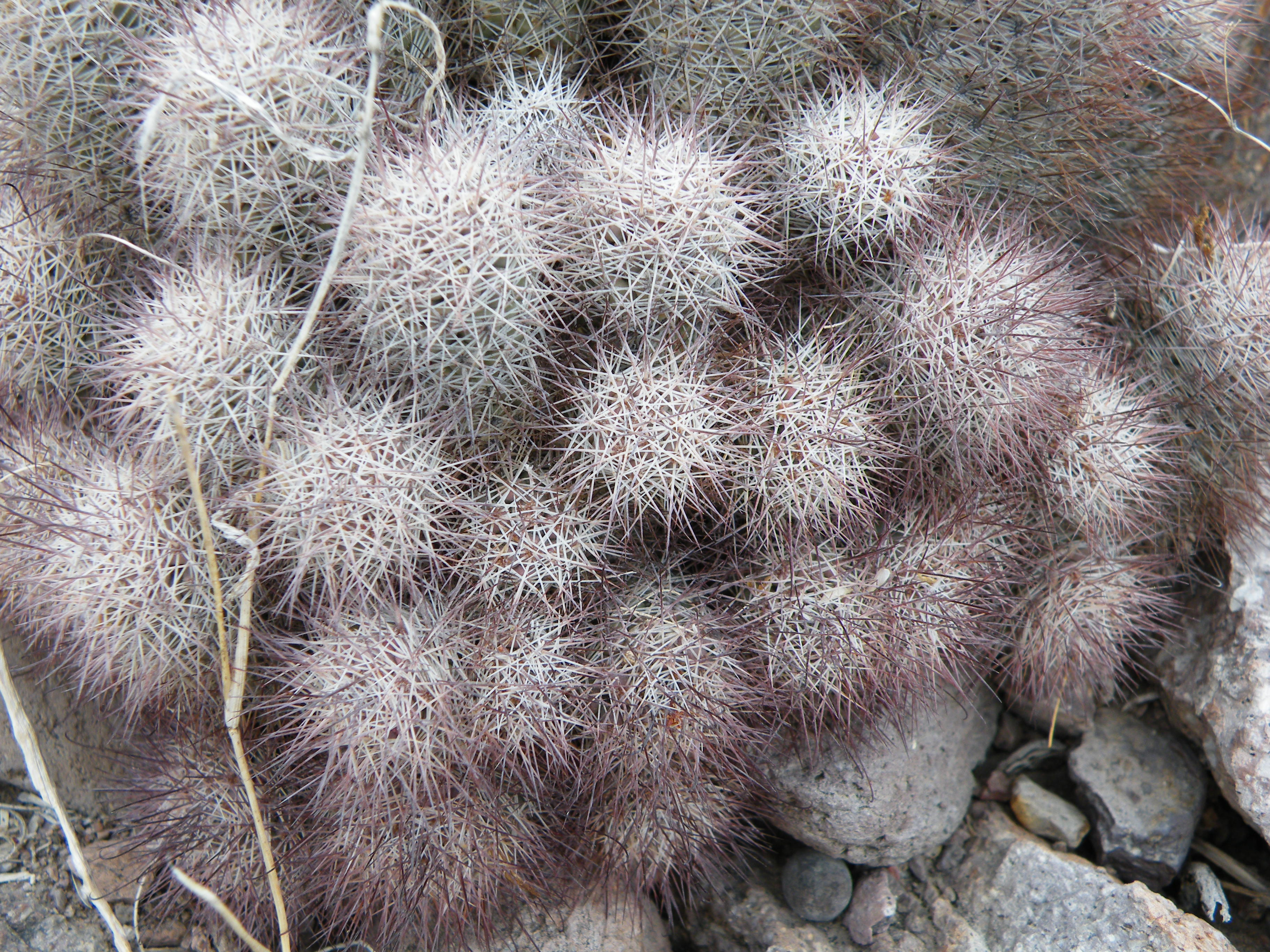
Habitat in La Paz, Baja California Sur

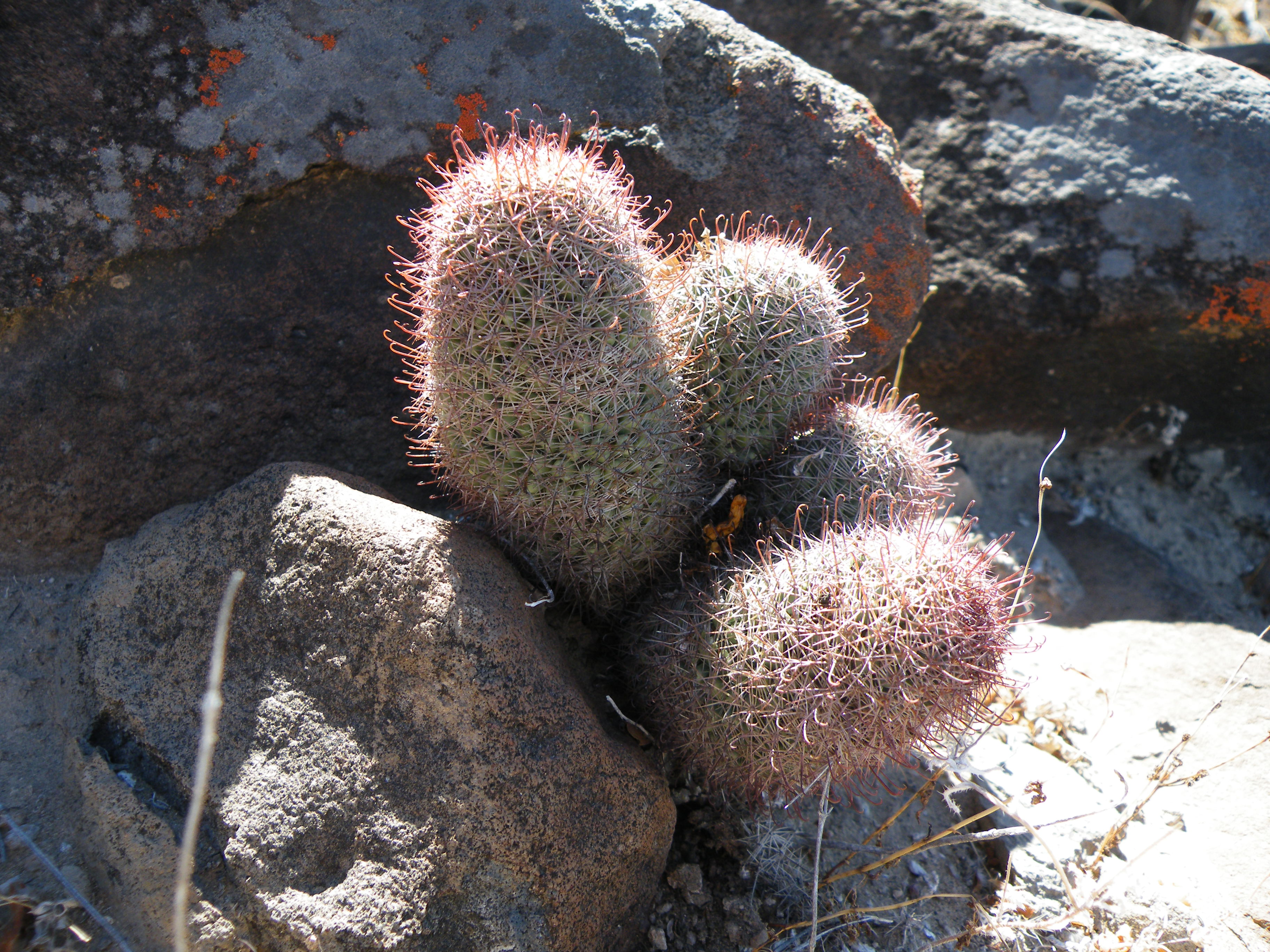
Habitat in Viscaino, Baja California Sur

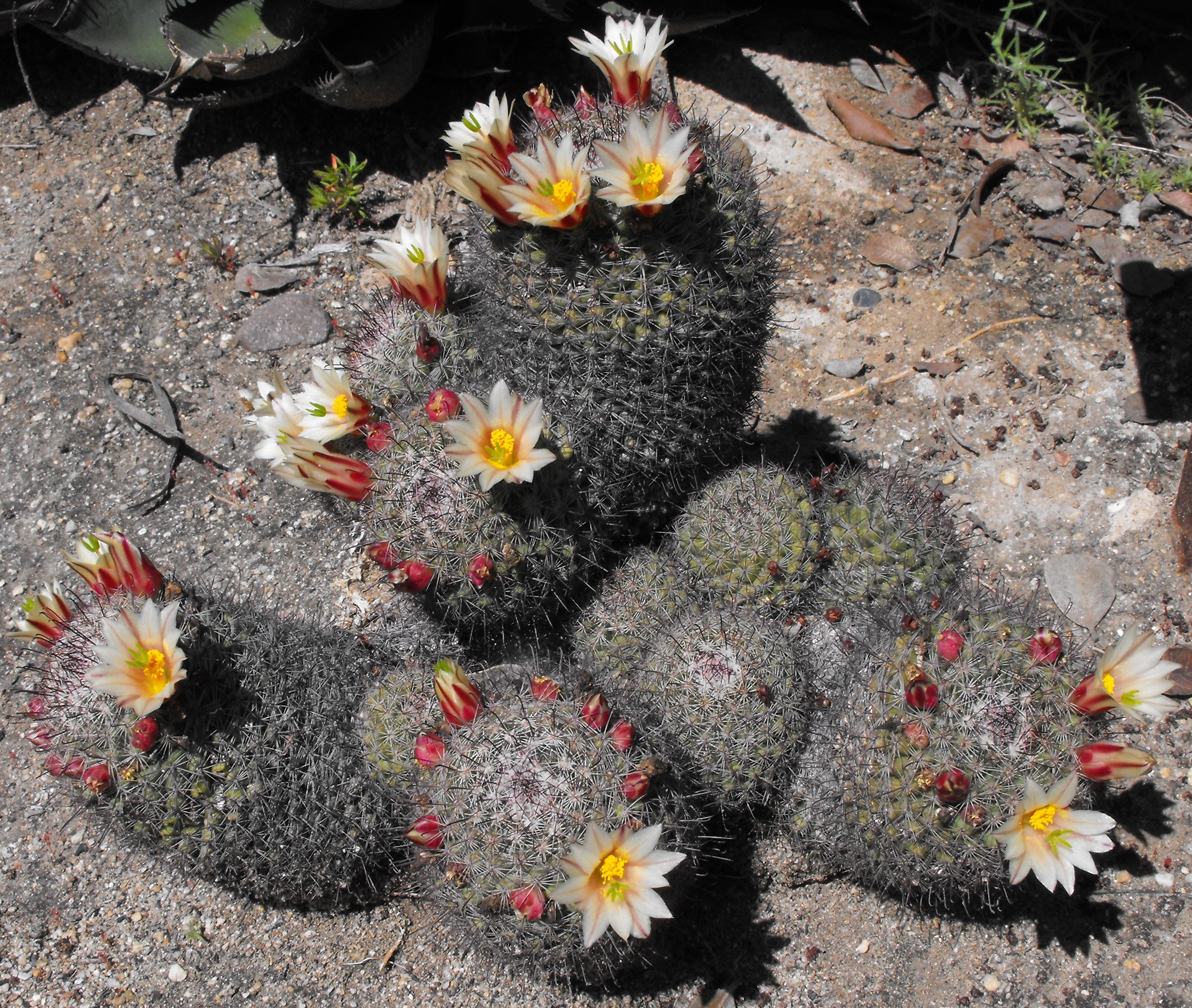
Plant growing in Torrey Pines State Reserve, San Diego, California, USA

== Uses ==
The Kumeyaay people (Diegueño), of Baja California and Southern California, eat the raw fruits as a food source.

=== Cultivation ===
Cochemiea dioica is cultivated by specialty cactus plant nurseries and by botanical gardens for plant sales. It requires very well-drained soil, and so is often grown in pots and in raised beds in drought tolerant gardens.
