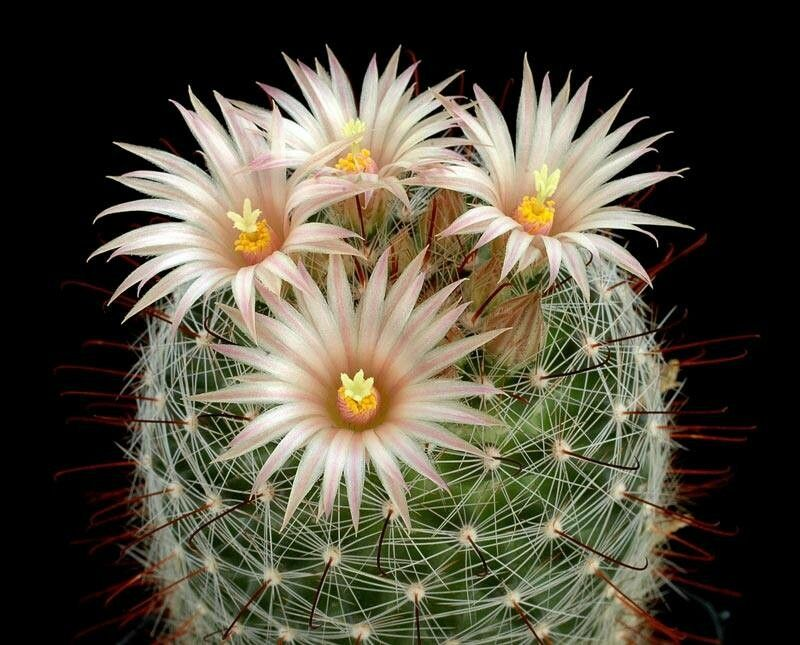

Conservation status
- Least Concern (IUCN 3.1)

Scientific classification
- Kingdom: Plantae
- Clade: Tracheophytes
- Clade: Angiosperms
- Clade: Eudicots
- Order: Caryophyllales
- Family: Cactaceae
- Subfamily: Cactoideae
- Genus: Cochemiea
- Species: C. barbata

Binomial name
- Cochemiea barbata (Engelm.) Doweld

Synonyms
- Mammillaria barbata Engelm. 1848.; Cactus barbatus (Engelm. in Wisliz.) Kuntze, 1891.; Chilita barbata (Engelm. in Wisliz.) Orcutt 1926.; Ebnerella barbata (Engelm. in Wisliz.) Buxb. 1951.; Neomammillaria barbata (Engelm. in Wisliz.) Britton & Rose, 1923.; Mammillaria barbata var. garessii (Cowper) Lodé, 1992.; Mammillaria garessii Cowper 1970.; Mammillaria barbata var. morricalii (Cowper) Lodé, 1992.; Mammillaria morricalii Cowper, 1969.; Mammillaria barbata var. santaclarensis (Cowper) Lodé, 1992.; Mammillaria santaclarensis Cowper, 1969.; Mammillaria chavezei Cowper, 1963 [invalid name]; Mammillaria melilotiae Laferr., 1998.; Mammillaria luthieniae Laferr., 1998.; Mammillaria orestera L.D.Benson, 1969.; Mammillaria viridiflora (Britton & Rose) Boed. 1933.; Chilita viridiflora (Britton & Rose) Orcutt 1926.; Mammillaria wilcoxii var. viridiflora (Britton & Rose) W.T.Marshall, 1950; Mammillaria wrightii var. viridiflora (Britton & Rose) W.T.Marshall 1950; Neomammillaria viridiflora Britton & Rose, 1923

= Cochemiea barbata =

Species of cactus

Cochemiea barbata is a small cactus native to Chihuahua, Sonora, and Durango, with the common name greenflower nipple cactus.

== Description ==
Cochemiea barbata grows either solitary or with multiple heads, forming dense cushions. The plant bodies are depressed, spherical to briefly cylindrical, and about 3 to 4 cm (1.2 to 1.6 in) in diameter. The soft, spherical to cylindrical warts lack milky juice. The axillae are naked. The 1 to 4 central spines are stiff, brown to reddish-brown or orange-brown, and up to 2 cm (0.79 in) long, with 1 or 2 being heavily hooked. The 16 to 60 marginal spines are in several rows, mostly hairy, whitish to yellowish with darker tips, and 0.6 to 0.8 cm (0.24 to 0.31 in) long.

The flowers are 1.5 to 3 cm (0.59 to 1.18 in) long and wide, varying in color from white, light pink to yellowish, pink to orange, or brownish to greenish. The outer perianth segments are ciliated. The elongated fruits are green to purple or dark red, up to 1 cm (0.39 in) in diameter, and contain dark reddish-brown seeds.

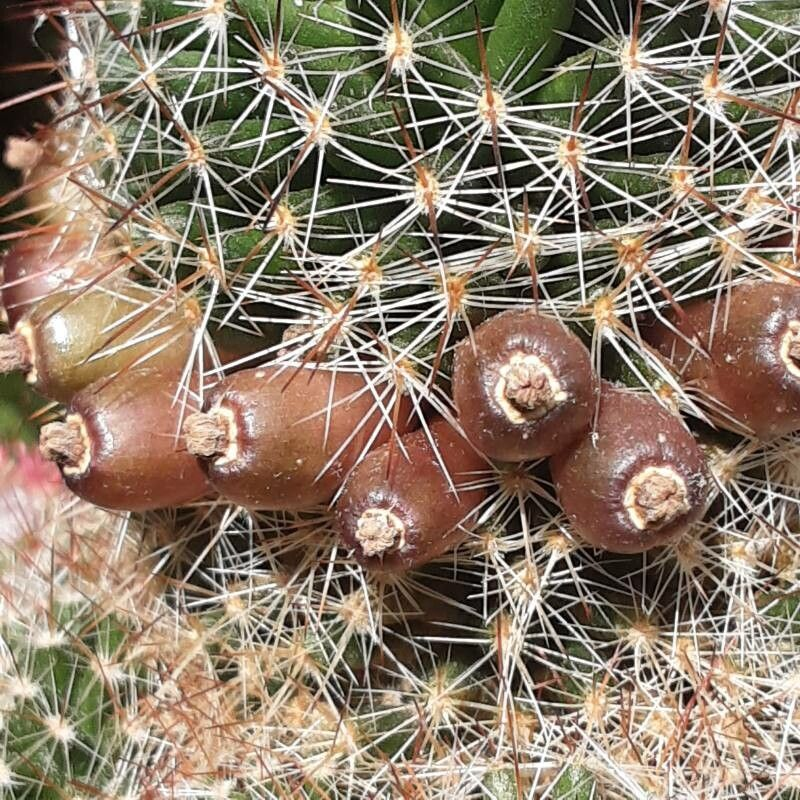
Fruits

== Distribution ==
Cochemiea barbata is found in Arizona, and New Mexico, USA, and Chihuahua, Sonora, and Durango, Mexico in mountainous locations in the Sierra Madre Occidental.

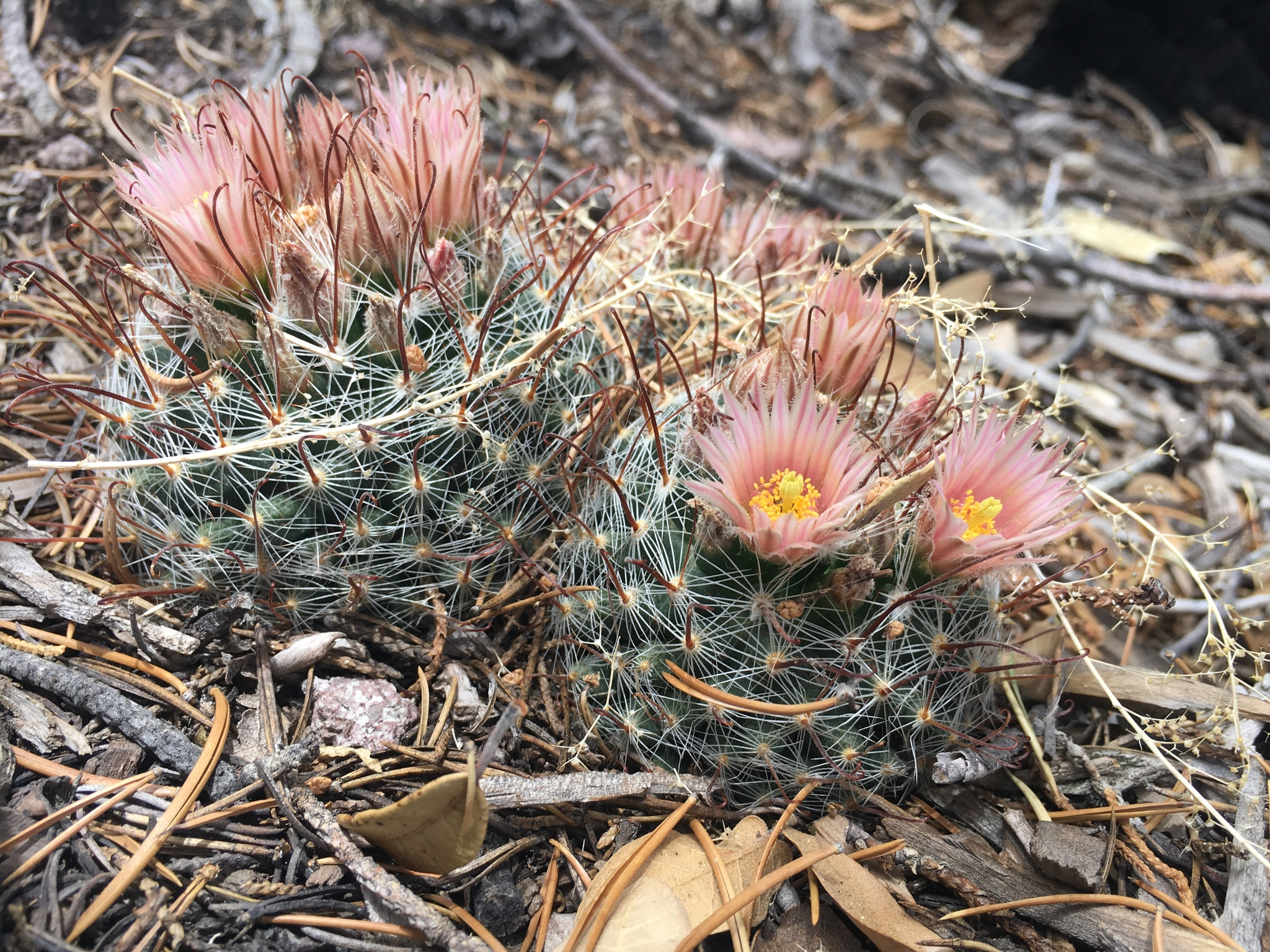
Habitat near Little Walnut Village, New Mexico

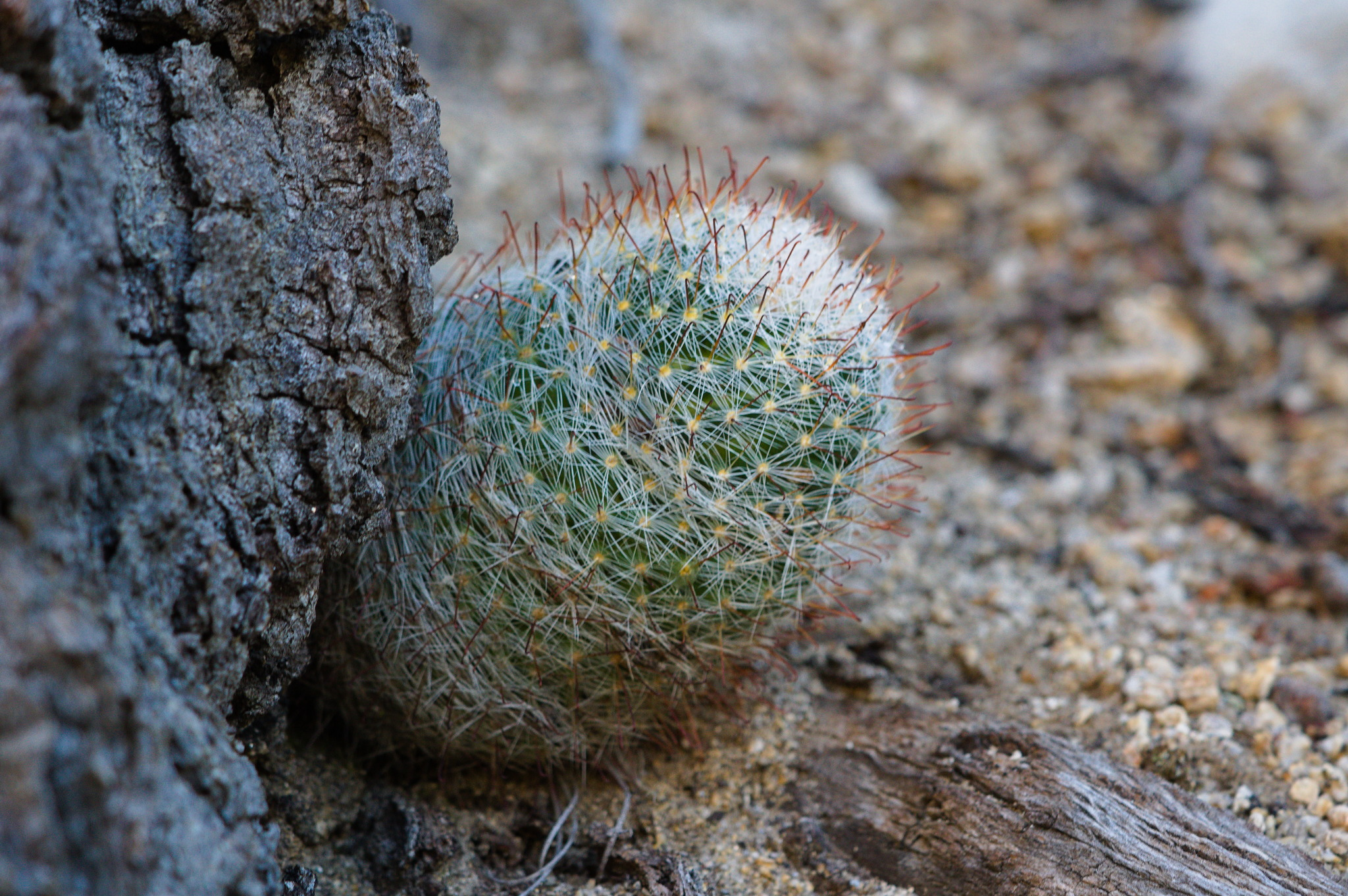
Habitat in Pima County, Arizona

== Taxonomy ==
First described as Mammillaria barbata by George Engelmann in 1848, the specific epithet "barbata" is Latin for "bearded", referring to the ciliated perianth segments. Alexander Borissovitch Doweld reclassified it to the genus Cochemiea in 2000.
