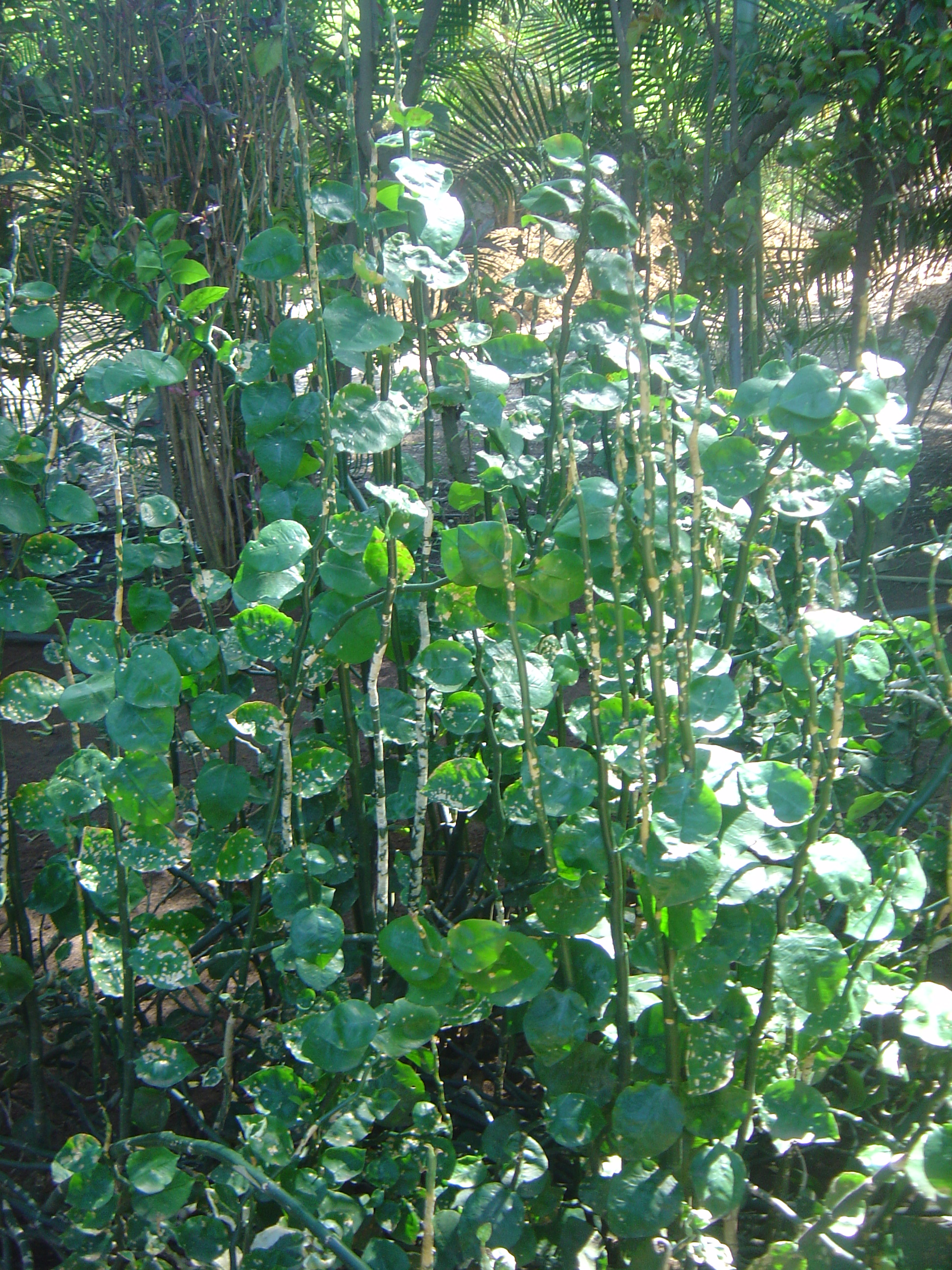
- Euphorbia tithymaloides

Scientific classification
- Kingdom: Plantae
- Clade: Tracheophytes
- Clade: Angiosperms
- Clade: Eudicots
- Clade: Rosids
- Order: Malpighiales
- Family: Euphorbiaceae
- Genus: Euphorbia
- Subgenus: Euphorbia
- Section: Euphorbia sect. Crepidaria (Haw.) Baill.

Species
- Euphorbia bracteata; Euphorbia calcarata; Euphorbia coalcomanensis; Euphorbia colligata; Euphorbia conzattii; Euphorbia cymbifera; Euphorbia cyri; Euphorbia diazlunana; Euphorbia dressleri; Euphorbia finkii; Euphorbia lomelii; Euphorbia peritropoides; Euphorbia personata; Euphorbia tehuacana; Euphorbia tithymaloides

= Pedilanthus =

Euphorbia sect. Crepidaria

Pedilanthus, the slipper spurges, was a plant genus of the family Euphorbiaceae, now subsumed into the genus Euphorbia on the basis of phylogenic analysis in the early 2000s. The former genus is now referred to as the Pedilanthus clade or as Euphorbia sect. Crepidaria. It includes 15 species, 14 of which are restricted to Mexico, Central America and the Caribbean. Only one species (E. tithymaloides) has a wide distribution, from the Florida to the West Indies and South America, and cultivated in all tropical regions with several cultivars.

== Description and habitats ==
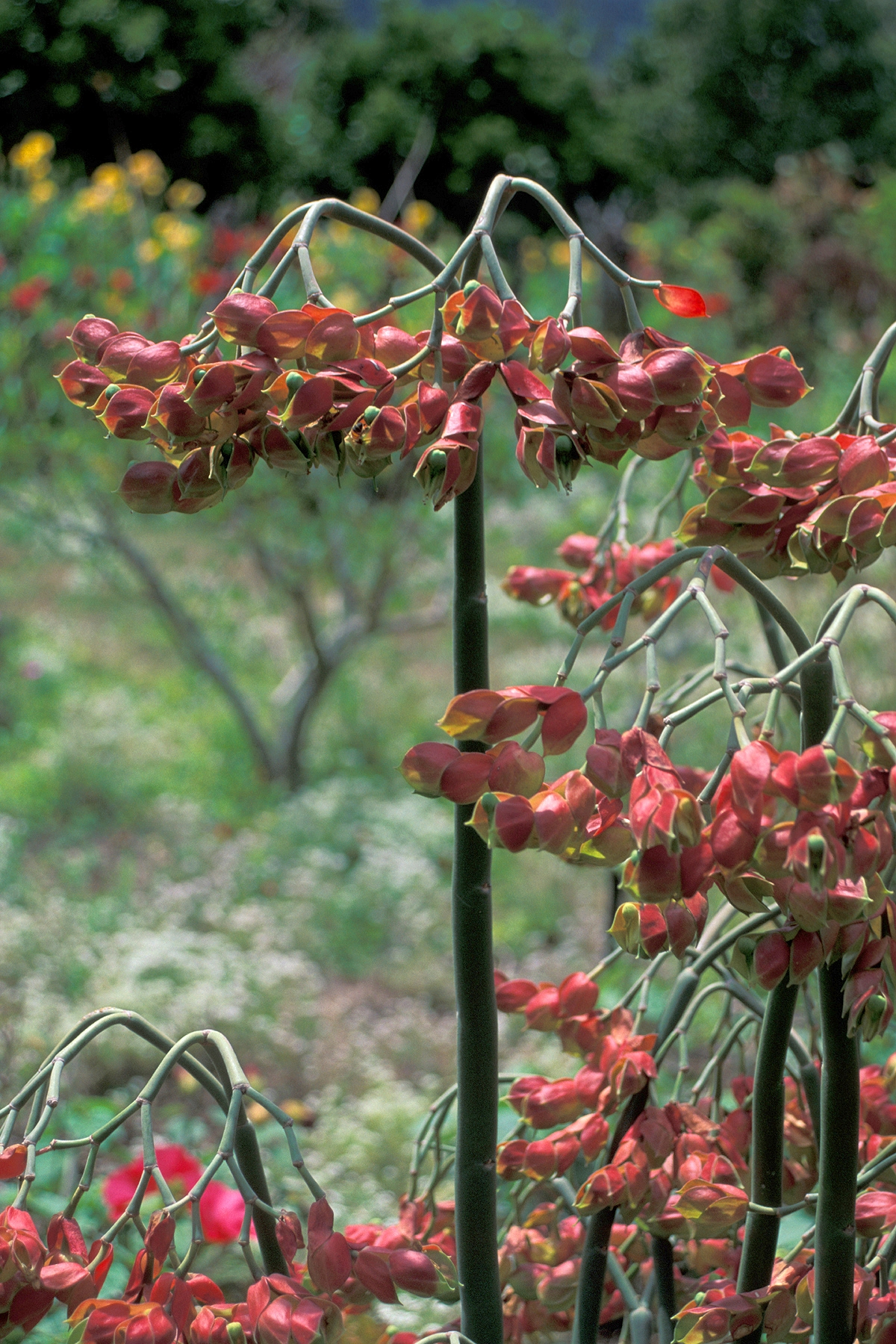
Euphorbia bracteata flowers

Pedilanthus is distinguished from other Euphorbia by its inflorescence, a spurred cyathia with fused styles and with it glands hidden within a nectar spur inspiring the common names of slipper spurge, slipper flower or slipper plant. Unlike other Euphorbia, members of this clade are mostly hummingbird pollinated.

Species of this clade occupy a remarkably wide range of habitats and life forms. Most of them, like E. tithymaloides, are small leafy shrubs found in the tropical dry forests of Mexico and the Caribbean. E. calcarata is a small woody tree of the tropical dry forests, E. cymbifera and E. lomelii are on the contrary almost leafless stem succulents. E. finkii is found in Mexico's moist forests.

Cacho et al. divide the clade into four subclades: a xeric subclade, with succulent shrubs of tropical deciduous forest, scrub or desert; A mesic subclade which includes all five species that inhabit mesic forests except E. finkii which forms its own subclade; and E. personata and E. tithymaloides with its subspecies which together make up the fourth subclade.

Pedianthus are widely cultivated as a ornamental plants as hedges and in gardens in the tropics and subtropics.

== Synonyms ==
- Crepidaria Haw.
- Diadenaria Klotzsch & Garcke
- Hexadenia Klotzsch & Garcke
- Tithymaloides Ortega
- Ventenatia Tratt.

== Species and subspecies ==
The former genus Pedilanthus consists of:

- Euphorbia bracteata (Pedilanthus bracteatus, Pedilanthus pavonis)
- Euphorbia calcarata (Pedilanthus calcaratus)
- Euphorbia coalcomanensis (Pedilanthus coalcomanensis)
- Euphorbia colligata (Pedilanthus connatus)
- Euphorbia conzattii (Pedilanthus pulchellus)
- Euphorbia cymbifera (Pedilanthus cymbiferus)
- Euphorbia cyri (Pedilanthus tomentellus)
- Euphorbia diazlunana (Pedilanthus diazlunanus)
- Euphorbia dressleri (Pedilanthus gracilis)
- Euphorbia finkii (Pedilanthus finkii)
- Euphorbia lomelii (Pedilanthus macrocarpus)
- Euphorbia peritropoides (Pedilanthus peritropoides, Pedilanthus palmeri)
- Euphorbia personata (Pedilanthus personatus, Pedilanthus nodiflorus)
- Euphorbia tehuacana (Pedilanthus tehuacanus)
- Euphorbia tithymaloides (Pedilanthus tithymaloides, Tithymalus tithymaloides) - devil's backbone, redbird cactus
  - Euphorbia tithymaloides subsp. angustifolia
  - Euphorbia tithymaloides subsp. bahamensis
  - Euphorbia tithymaloides subsp. jamaicensis
  - Euphorbia tithymaloides subsp. padifolia
  - Euphorbia tithymaloides subsp. parasitica
  - Euphorbia tithymaloides subsp. retusa
  - Euphorbia tithymaloides subsp. smallii
  - Euphorbia tithymaloides subsp. tithymaloides
