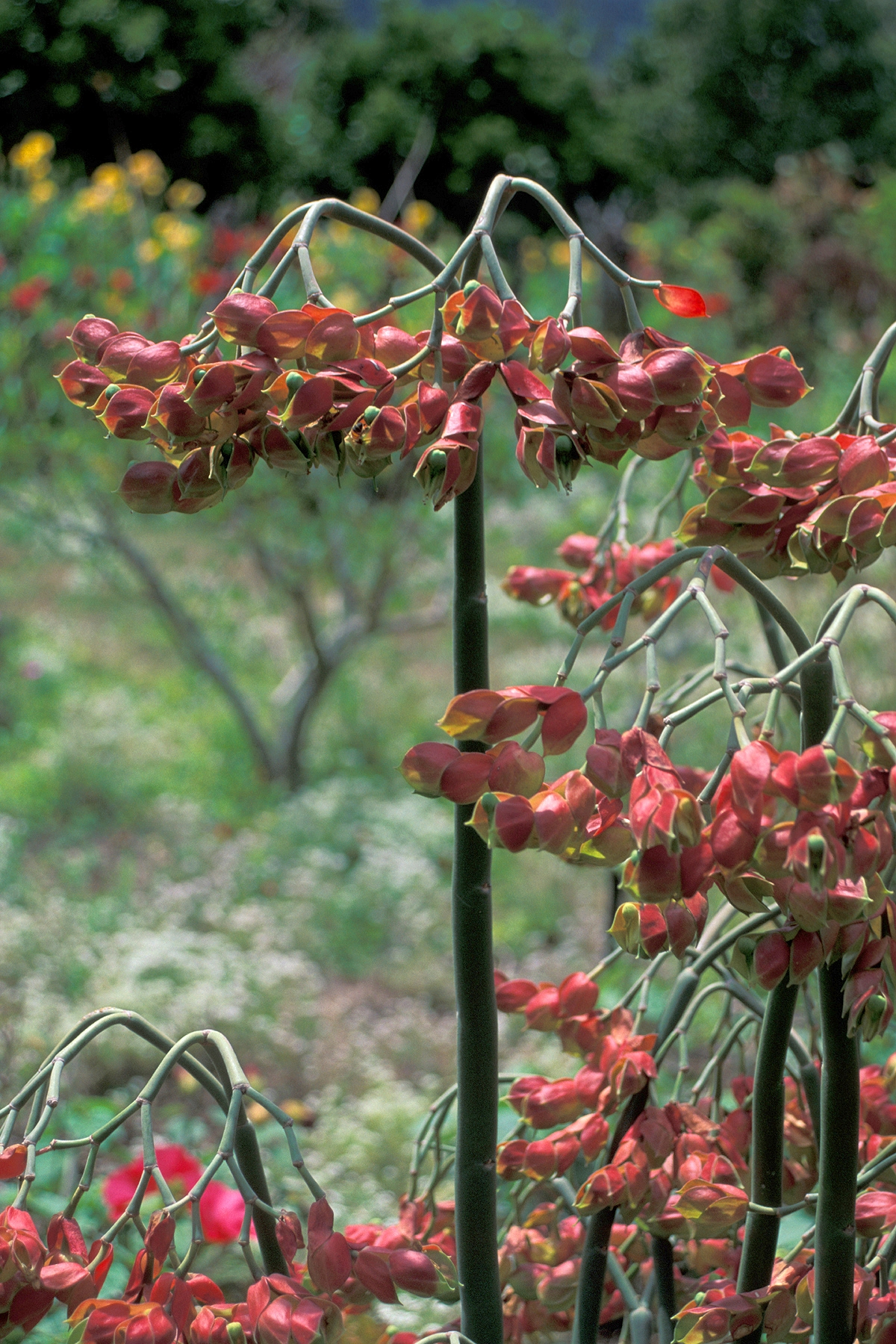
- Red bracts of Euphorbia bracteata

Scientific classification
- Kingdom: Plantae
- Clade: Tracheophytes
- Clade: Angiosperms
- Clade: Eudicots
- Clade: Rosids
- Order: Malpighiales
- Family: Euphorbiaceae
- Genus: Euphorbia
- Subgenus: Euphorbia
- Section: Euphorbia sect. Crepidaria
- Species: E. bracteata

Binomial name
- Euphorbia bracteata Jacq.

Synonyms
- Pedilanthus bracteatus (Jacq.) Boiss.; Tithymalus bracteatus (Jacq.) Haw.

= Euphorbia bracteata =

Species of plant

Euphorbia bracteata, the tall slipper plant, emerald bird cactus or little bird flower, is a perennial succulent spurge native to Mexico. It was formerly placed in the genus Pedilanthus, the slipper spurges, and was known as Pedilanthus bracteatus.

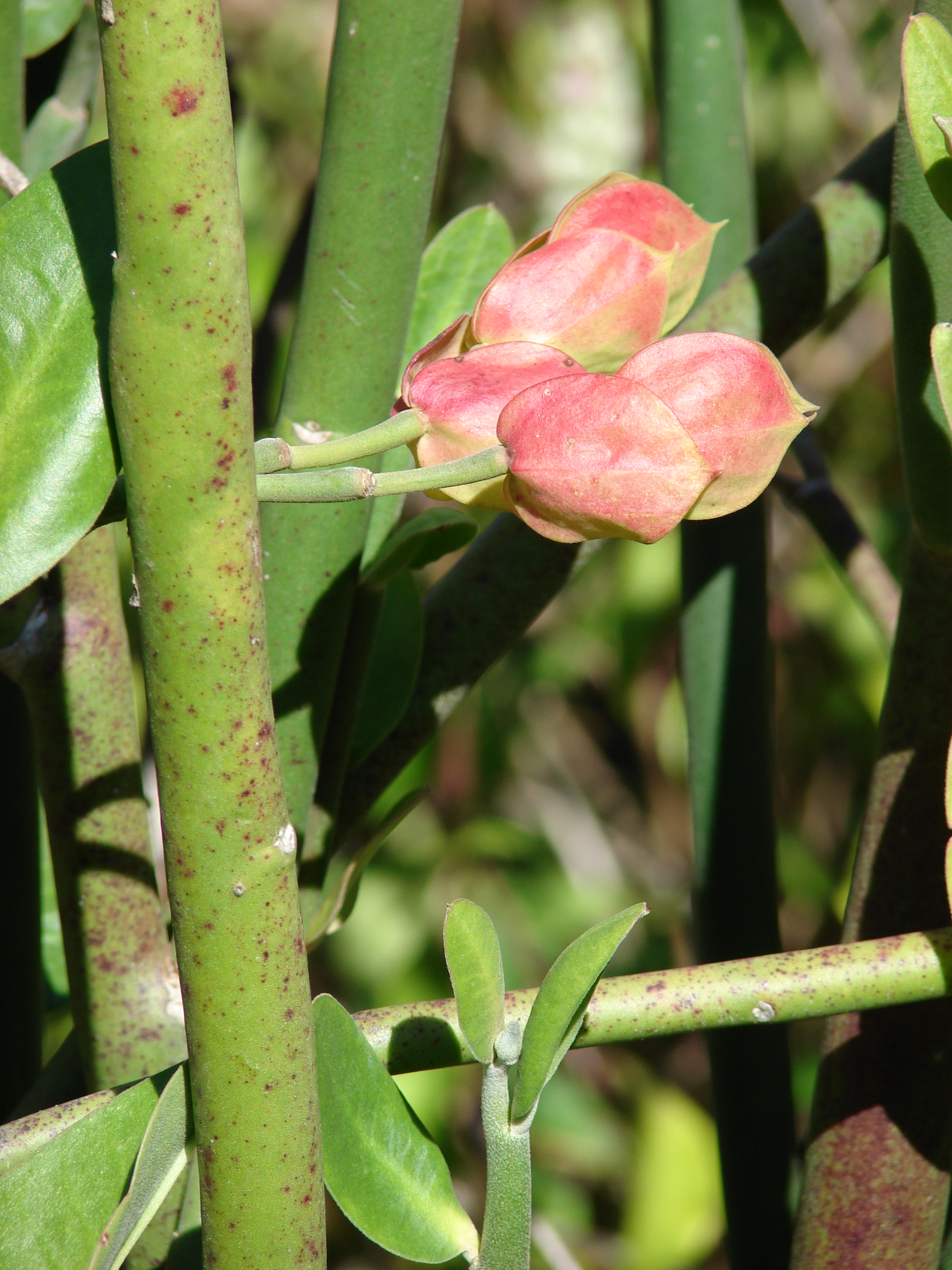
Euphorbia bracteata

The plant is a semi-succulent shrub that grows primarily in desert and dry shrubland in northern, central and southwestern Mexico. It is recognizable for its reddish bracts surrounding green or yellow flowers.

The Latin specific epithet bracteata means "with bracts". In Spanish the plant is known as venenillo, planta zapatilla and candelilla, though the latter name almost always refers to Euphorbia antisyphilitica. In East and Southeast Asia, where it is cultivated as an ornamental plant, it is known as bunga cucak rowo or bunga burung in Indonesian and Malay and xiǎoniǎo huā (小鳥花) or cuìquè shānhú (翠雀珊瑚) in Chinese.
