= Tratt =

Tratt is a surname. Notable people with the name include:

- Anthony Tratt (born 1965), Australian racing car driver
- Eduard Tratt (1919–1944), German Luftwaffe fighter and flying ace
- Jacob Tratt (born 1994), Australian footballer
- Karl Tratt (1900–1937), German painter
- Paul Tratt, American college football player and coach

The abbreviation Tratt. may refer to:

- trattenuto, term in music theory
- Leopold Trattinnick, (1764–1849), Austrian botanist and mycologist
