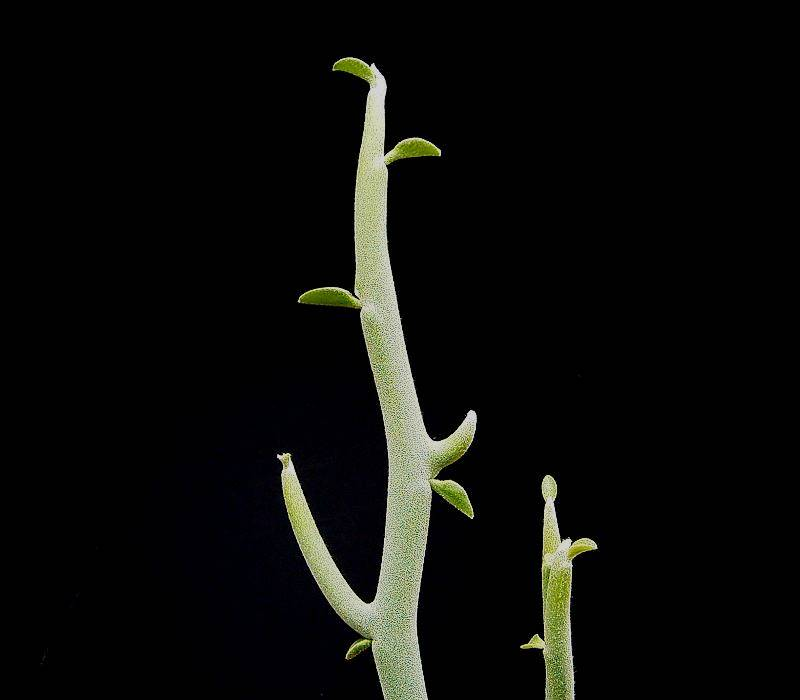

Scientific classification
- Kingdom: Plantae
- Clade: Tracheophytes
- Clade: Angiosperms
- Clade: Eudicots
- Clade: Rosids
- Order: Malpighiales
- Family: Euphorbiaceae
- Genus: Euphorbia
- Section: Euphorbia sect. Crepidaria
- Species: E. lomelii

Binomial name
- Euphorbia lomelii V.W.Steinm.

Synonyms
- Pedilanthus macrocarpus Benth.

= Euphorbia lomelii =

Perennial succulent plant native to Mexico

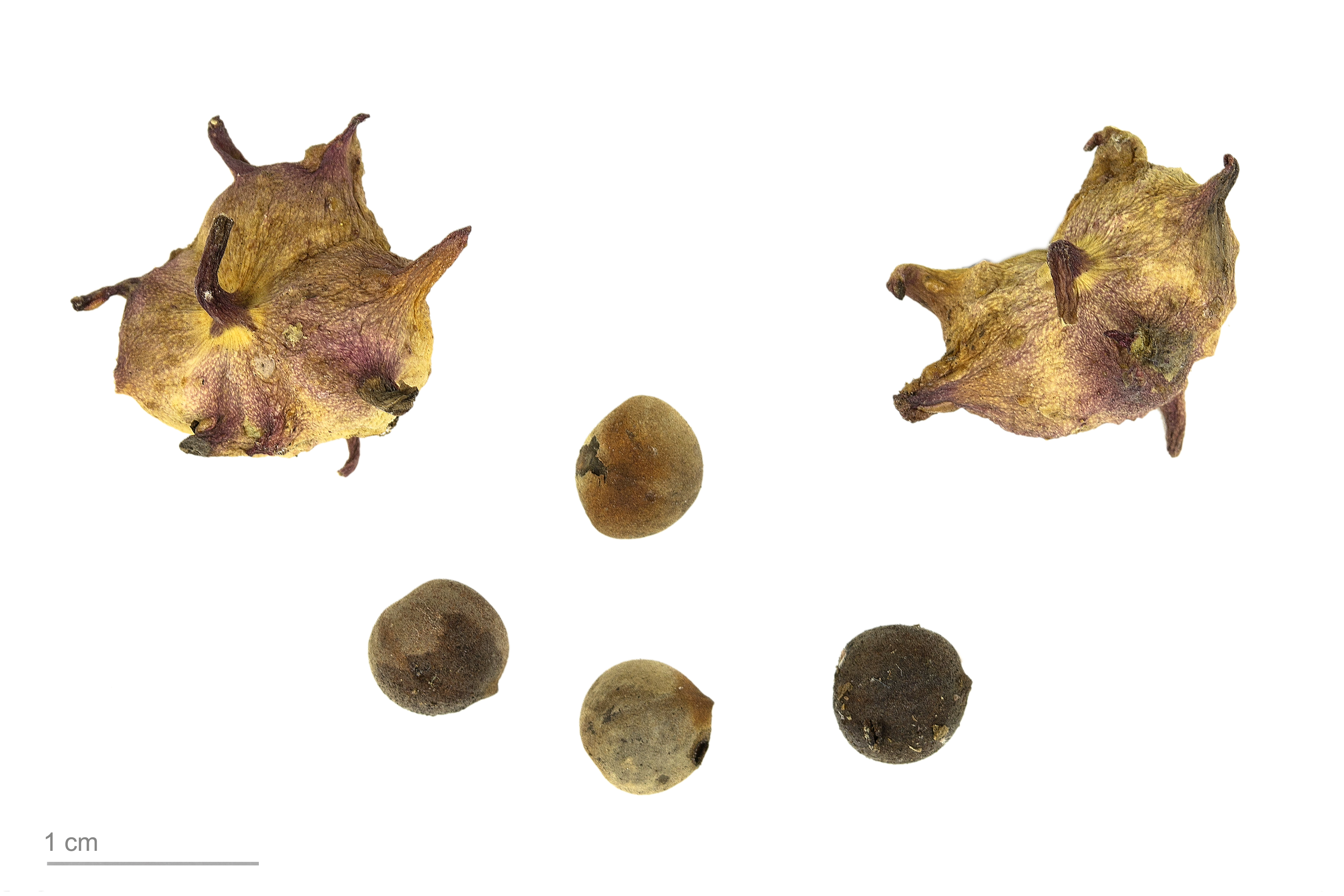
Euphorbia lomelii MHNT

Euphorbia lomelii is a perennial succulent plant native to Sonora, Mexico. Formerly called Pedilanthus macrocarpus Benth. Its common names include slipper plant, ladies slipper and gallito.
