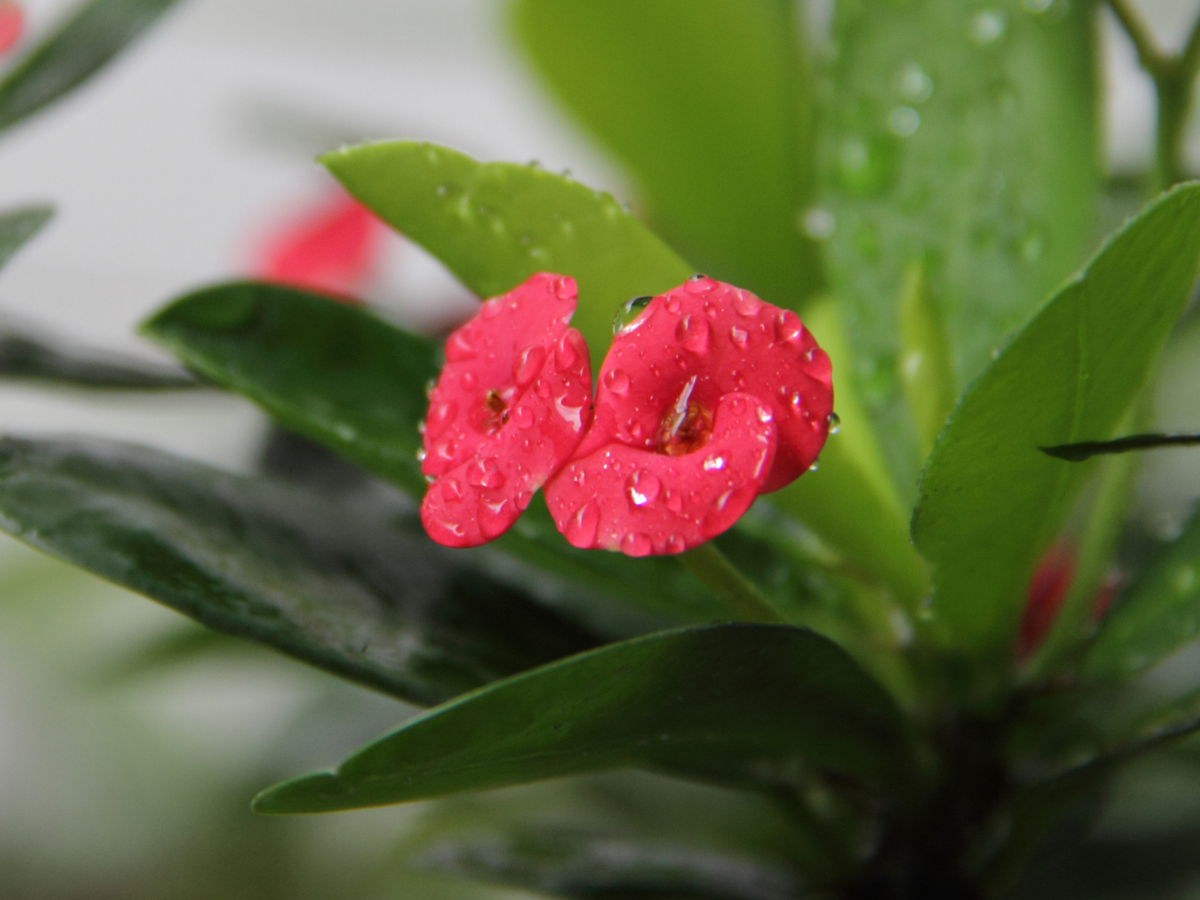
- Euphorbia milii flower

Scientific classification
- Kingdom: Plantae
- Clade: Tracheophytes
- Clade: Angiosperms
- Clade: Eudicots
- Clade: Rosids
- Order: Malpighiales
- Family: Euphorbiaceae
- Genus: Euphorbia
- Subgenus: Euphorbia

Select sections
- E. sect. Cubanthus; E. sect. Crepidaria; E. sect. Euphorbia; E. sect. Goniostema; E. sect. Monadenium; E. sect. Tirucalli

= Euphorbia subg. Euphorbia =

Subgenus of plants

Euphorbia subg. Euphorbia is one of four subgenera of the large and diverse genus of flowering plants, Euphorbia, or the spurges.

The subgenus contains contains over 650 species and includes five genera that were subsumed into Euphorbia in the early 2000s. These five are now included as the Old World E. sect. Monadenium (including the former genera Endadenium, Monadenium and Synadenium) and the New World E. sect. Crepidaria (the former genus Pedilanthus) and E. sect. Cubanthus (the former genus Cubanthus).

Euphorbia is the most diverse of the four subgenera in terms of morphology and habitat.
