= Paul Tratt =

American football player and coach c. 1875 – 1960

Biographical details
- Born: c. 1875
- Died: January 16, 1960 (aged 84); Jefferson County, Wisconsin, U.S

Playing career
- 1897–1900: Wisconsin
- Position: Quarterback

Coaching career (HC unless noted)
- 1901: Grinnell
- 1904: Whitewater Normal

Head coaching record
- Overall: 10–4–1

Paul H. Tratt (c. 1875 – January 16, 1960) was an American college football player and coach. He served as the head football coach at Grinnell College in Grinnell, Iowa in 1901< and Whitewater Normal School—now known as the University of Wisconsin–Whitewater—in 1904.

Tratt played football at the University of Wisconsin, where he was a four-year letterwinner.

Tratt later practiced law and ran an insurance agency in Fort Atkinson, Wisconsin. He died at the age of 84, on January 16, 1960, at hospital in Jefferson County, Wisconsin.
