= Garcke =

Garcke is a surname. Notable people with the surname include:

- Christian August Friedrich Garcke (1819–1904), German botanist
- Emile Garcke (1856–1930), German-British electrical engineer and entrepreneur
- Harald Garcke (born 1963), German mathematician and professor
