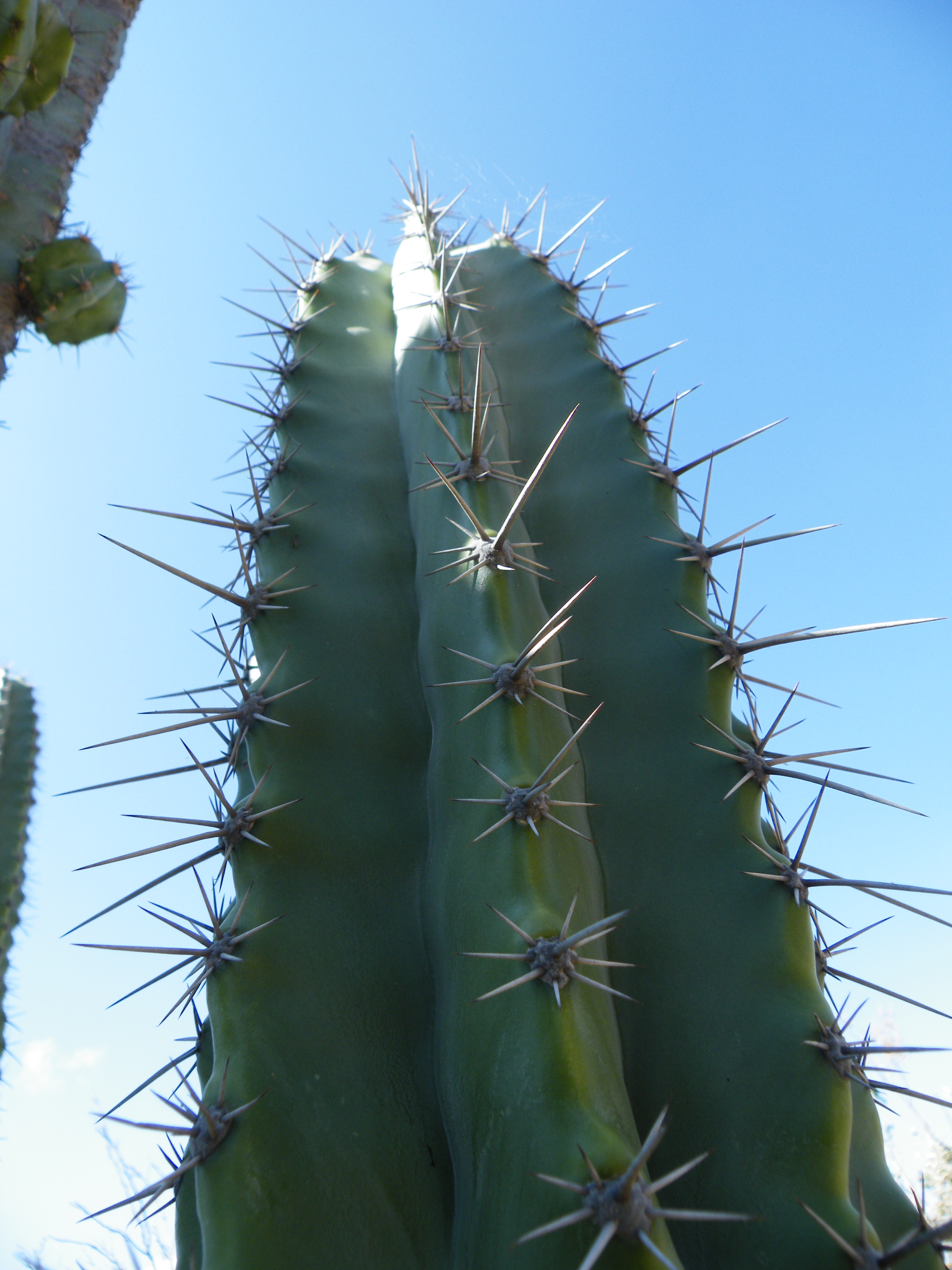

Conservation status
- Least Concern (IUCN 3.1)

Scientific classification
- Kingdom: Plantae
- Clade: Tracheophytes
- Clade: Angiosperms
- Clade: Eudicots
- Order: Caryophyllales
- Family: Cactaceae
- Subfamily: Cactoideae
- Genus: Stenocereus
- Species: S. stellatus

Binomial name
- Stenocereus stellatus (Pfeiff.) Riccob. 1909

Synonyms
- Cereus stellatus Pfeiff. 1836; Lemaireocereus stellatus (Pfeiff.) Britton & Rose 1909; Neolemaireocereus stellatus (Pfeiff.) Backeb. 1942; Rathbunia stellata (Pfeiff.) P.V.Heath 1992; Stenocereus stellatus var. tenellianus Riccob. 1909

= Stenocereus stellatus =

Species of cactus

Stenocereus stellatus is a flowering plant in the family Cactaceae that is found in Oaxaca, Mexico

== Description ==
Stenocereus stellatus grows tree-shaped or shrub-like with shoots branching from the base and reaches heights of 2 to 4 meters. A short trunk is formed. The dark green to bluish green, upright shoots have a diameter of 7 to 10 centimeters. There are eight to twelve blunt, rounded ribs divided into cusps that are up to 2 centimeters high. The usually three gray central spines are 2 to 6 centimeters long. One of them is directed downwards, the others upwards. The seven to nine radiating gray marginal spines have a darker tip. They are shorter than the central spines.

The tubular to narrow bell-shaped, light pink flowers appear near the top of the shoot and open at night. They are 4.5 to 9 centimeters long. The spherical, green or red fruits reach a diameter of 5 to 6 centimeters. The pulp is red, white, orange, yellow, or purple with black seeds.

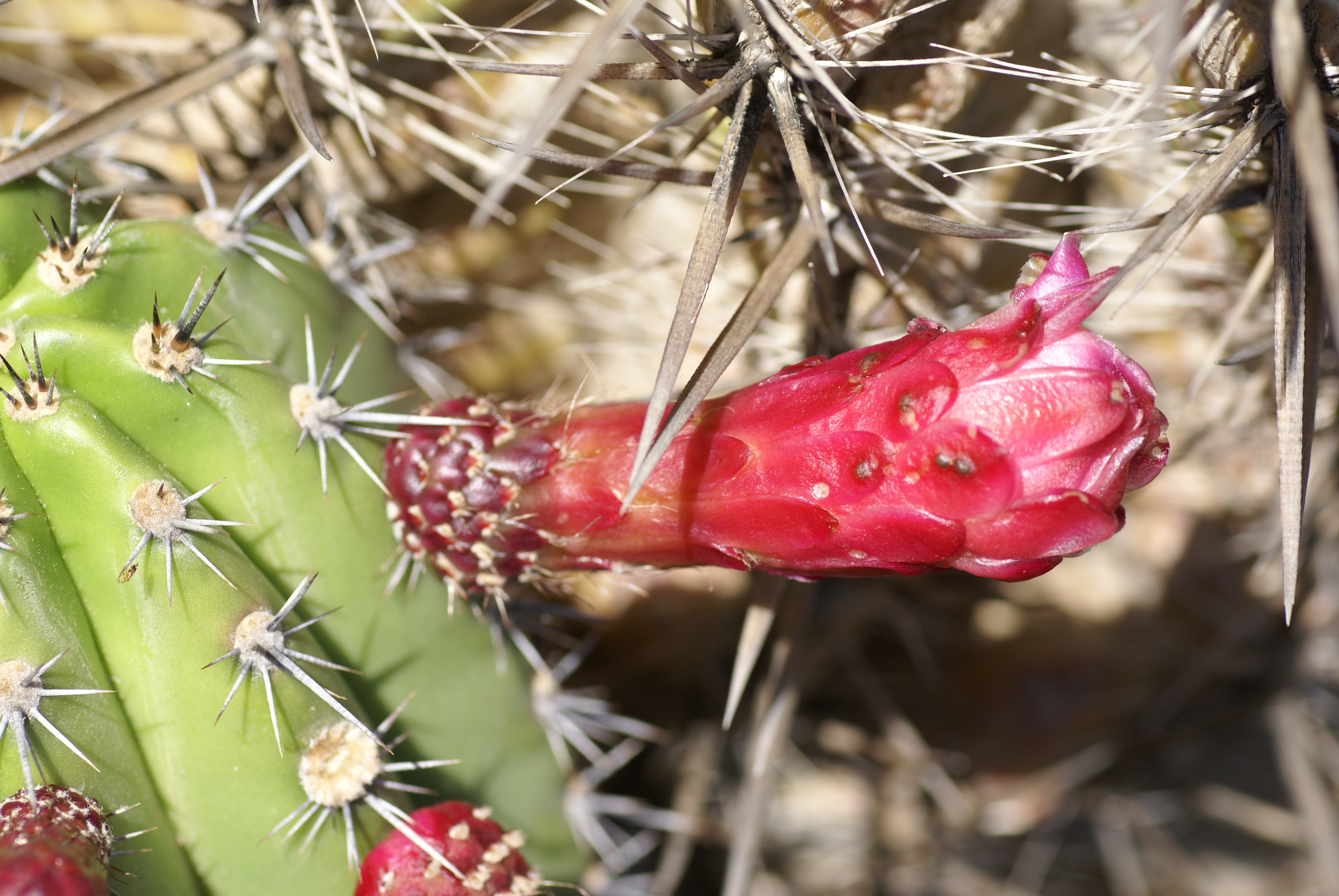

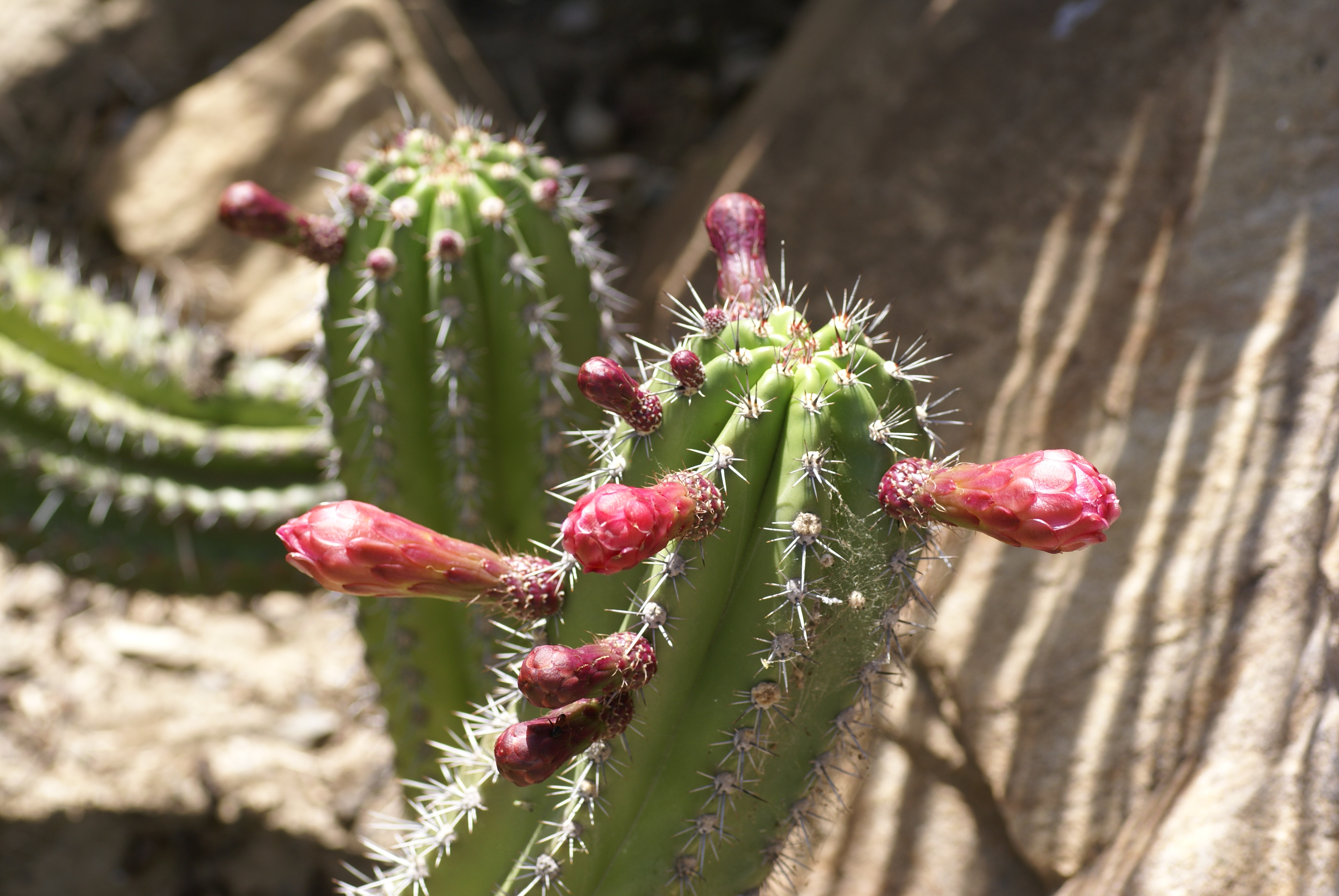

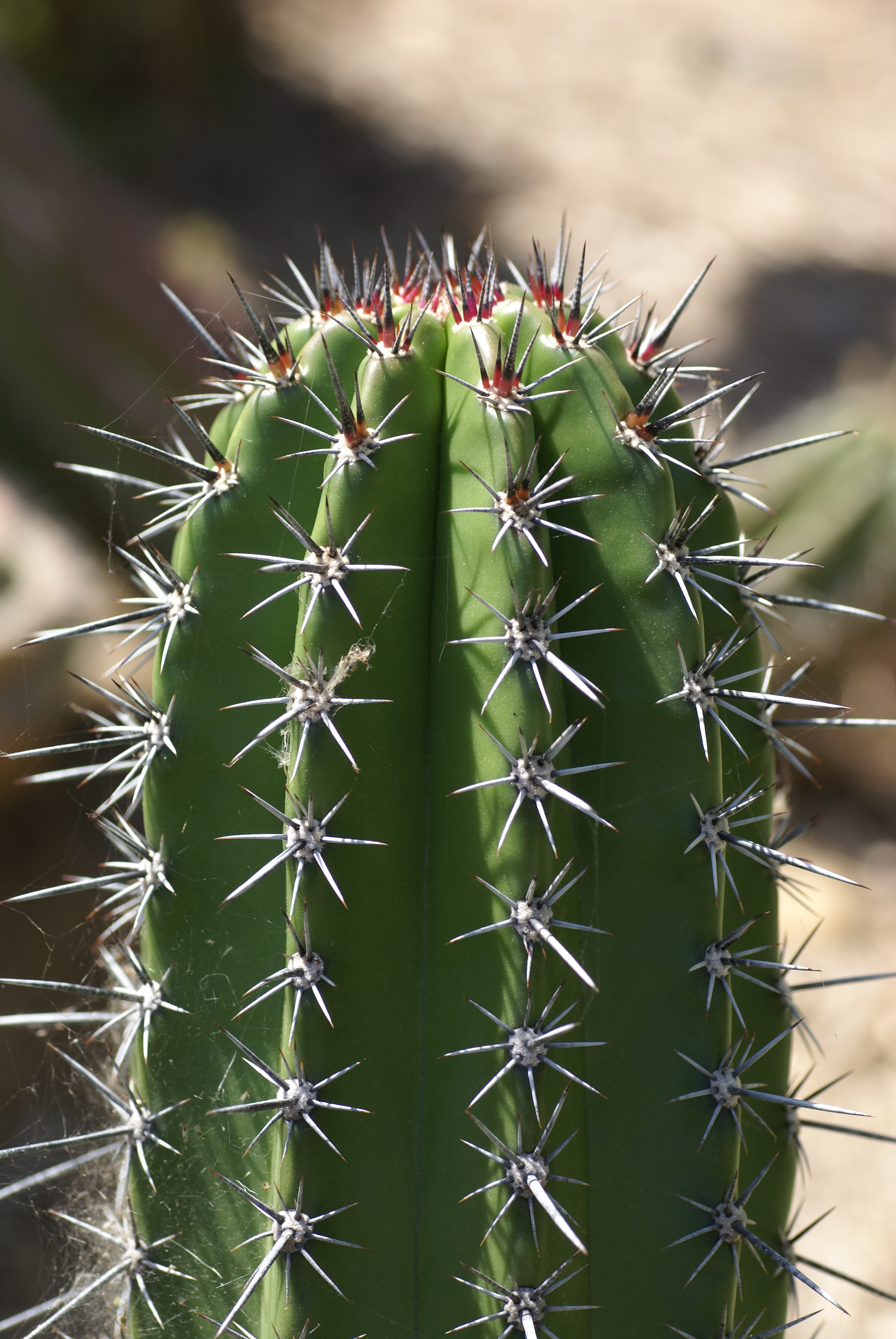

== Distribution ==
Stenocereus stellatus is widespread in the Mexican states of Guerrero, Morelos, Puebla and Oaxaca at altitudes of 500 to 2,200 meters growing in limestone and sandstone soils in thorn-scrub and tropical dry forests. Plants grow along with Ceiba aesculifolia, Parkinsonia praecox, Ipomoea arborescens, Ipomoea murucoides, Fouquieria formosa, Neltuma laevigata, Lippia origanoides, Lophocereus marginatus, Myrtillocactus geometrizans, Myrtillocactus schenckii, Polaskia chichipe, Polaskia chende, Stenocereus pruinosus, Escontria chiotilla, Pachycereus weberi, Lemaireocereus hollianus, Isolatocereus dumortieri, and Stenocereus treleasei. Plants are pollinated by bats such as Leptonycteris yerbabuenae, L. nivalis, Choeronycteris mexicana, Glossophaga soricina, and Artibeus jamaicensis; bees such as Xylocopa mexicanorum, Bombus pensylvanicus, and Plebeia mexicana; and hummingbirds such as Amazilia violiceps, Phaeoptila sordida, and Cynanthus latirostris.

== Taxonomy ==
The first description as Cereus stellatus was made in 1836 by Ludwig Karl Georg Pfeiffer. The specific epithet stellatus comes from Latin, means 'star-shaped' and refers to the arrangement of the thorns on the areoles of the species. Spanish common names are “Pitayo” and “Xoconostle”. Vincenzo Riccobono placed the species in the genus Stenocereus in 1909. Other nomenclature synonyms are Lemaireocereus stellatus (Pfeiff.) Britton & Rose (1909), Neolemaireocereus stellatus (Pfeiff.) Backeb. (1942) and Rathbunia stellata (Pfeiff.) P.V.Heath (1992).
