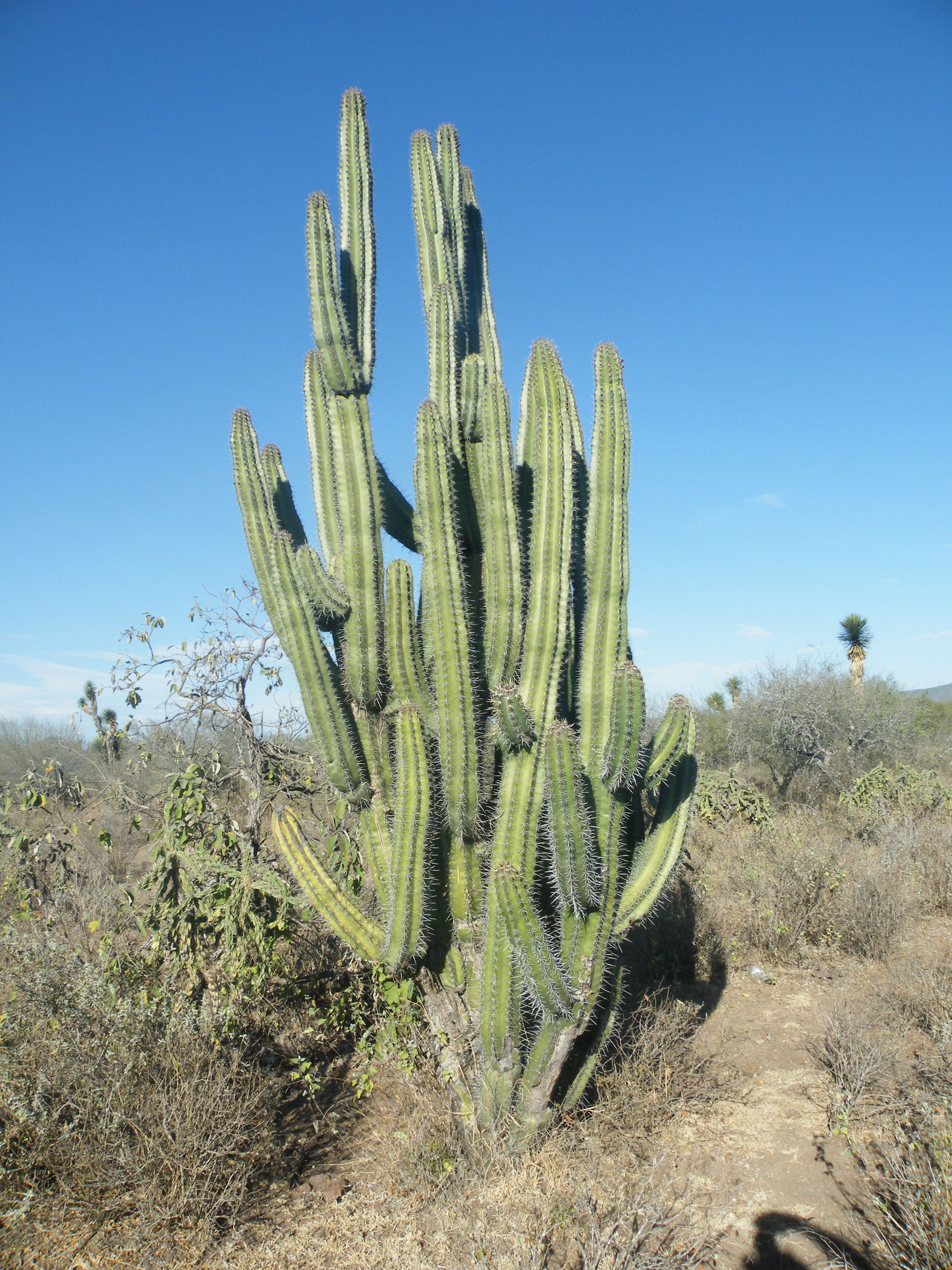

Conservation status
- Least Concern (IUCN 3.1)

Scientific classification
- Kingdom: Plantae
- Clade: Tracheophytes
- Clade: Angiosperms
- Clade: Eudicots
- Order: Caryophyllales
- Family: Cactaceae
- Subfamily: Cactoideae
- Genus: Stenocereus
- Species: S. pruinosus

Binomial name
- Stenocereus pruinosus (Otto ex Pfeiff.) Buxb.

Synonyms
- Cereus pruinosus (Otto ex Pfeiff.) C.F.Först. 1846; Echinocactus pruinosus Otto ex Pfeiff. 1837; Griseocactus pruinosus (Otto ex Pfeiff.) Guiggi 2012; Griseocereus pruinosus (Otto ex Pfeiff.) Guiggi 2012; Lemaireocereus pruinosus (Otto ex Pfeiff.) Britton & Rose 1920; Neogriseocereus pruinosus (Otto ex Pfeiff.) Guiggi 2013; Rathbunia pruinosa (Otto ex Pfeiff.) P.V.Heath 1992; Ritterocereus pruinosus (Otto ex Pfeiff.) Backeb. 1951; Cactus pruinosus Monv. ex Steud. 1840; Cereus laevigatus Salm-Dyck 1850; Cereus roridus Pfeiff. 1837; Cereus schumannii Mathsson ex K.Schum. 1899; Lemaireocereus laevigatus (Salm-Dyck) Borg 1951; Lemaireocereus schumannii (Mathsson ex K.Schum.) Britton & Rose 1909; Pachycereus schumannii (Mathsson ex K.Schum.) C.Nelson 2001; Rathbunia laevigata (Salm-Dyck) P.V.Heath 1992; Rathbunia laevigata var. schumannii (Mathsson ex K.Schum.) P.V.Heath 1992; Ritterocereus laevigatus (Salm-Dyck) Backeb. 1960; Stenocereus laevigatus (Salm-Dyck) Buxb. 1961; Stenocereus laevigatus var. schumannii (Mathsson ex K.Schum.) P.V.Heath 1996

= Stenocereus pruinosus =

Species of plant

Stenocereus pruinosus is a species of cactus. It is endemic to Mexico and occurs in the states of Veracruz, Puebla, and Oaxaca.

== Description ==
Stenocereus pruinosus grows in the form of a tree with sparsely to richly branching stems and reaches a size of 4–5 m in height. A clear trunk is usually formed. It has a light glaucous trunk with dark green shoots and they are 8 to 12 cm in diameter. There are six (rarely five to eight) corrugated ribs. The areoles with three to nine grayish central spines 2 to 3 cm (rarely up to 5 cm) long. The five to nine (rarely up to twelve) radial spines are also grayish in color and usually less than 15 millimeters. Funnel-shaped flowers, white, up to 9 cm long with the flowers appearing near the tips of the shoots. They open at night and are open until the next day. The elongated green fruit, tinged with red, 6 to 12 cm long and can reach a diameter of 5.5 to 8.1 cm. The flesh is yellow, orange, red, or purple.

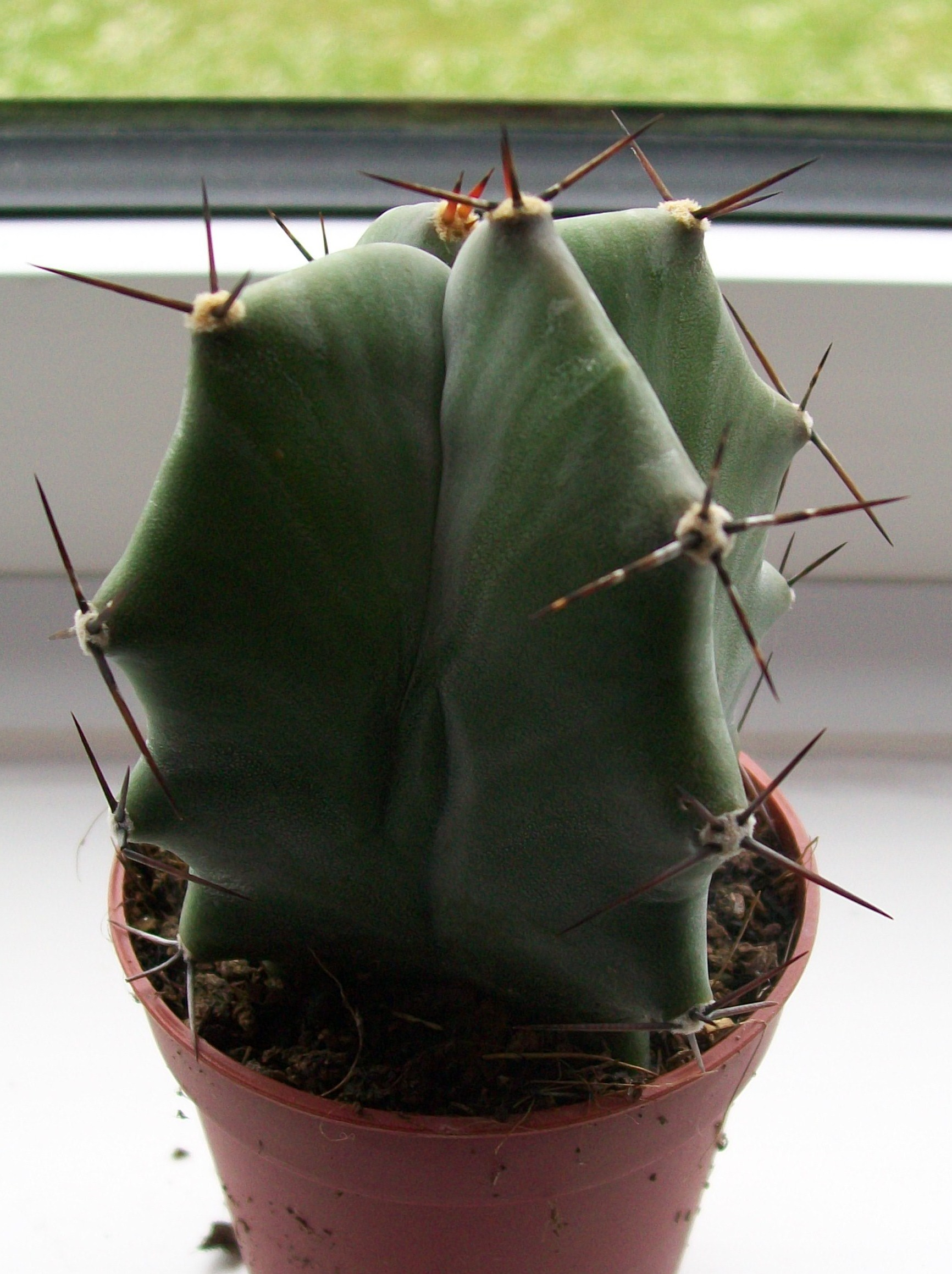
Small plant

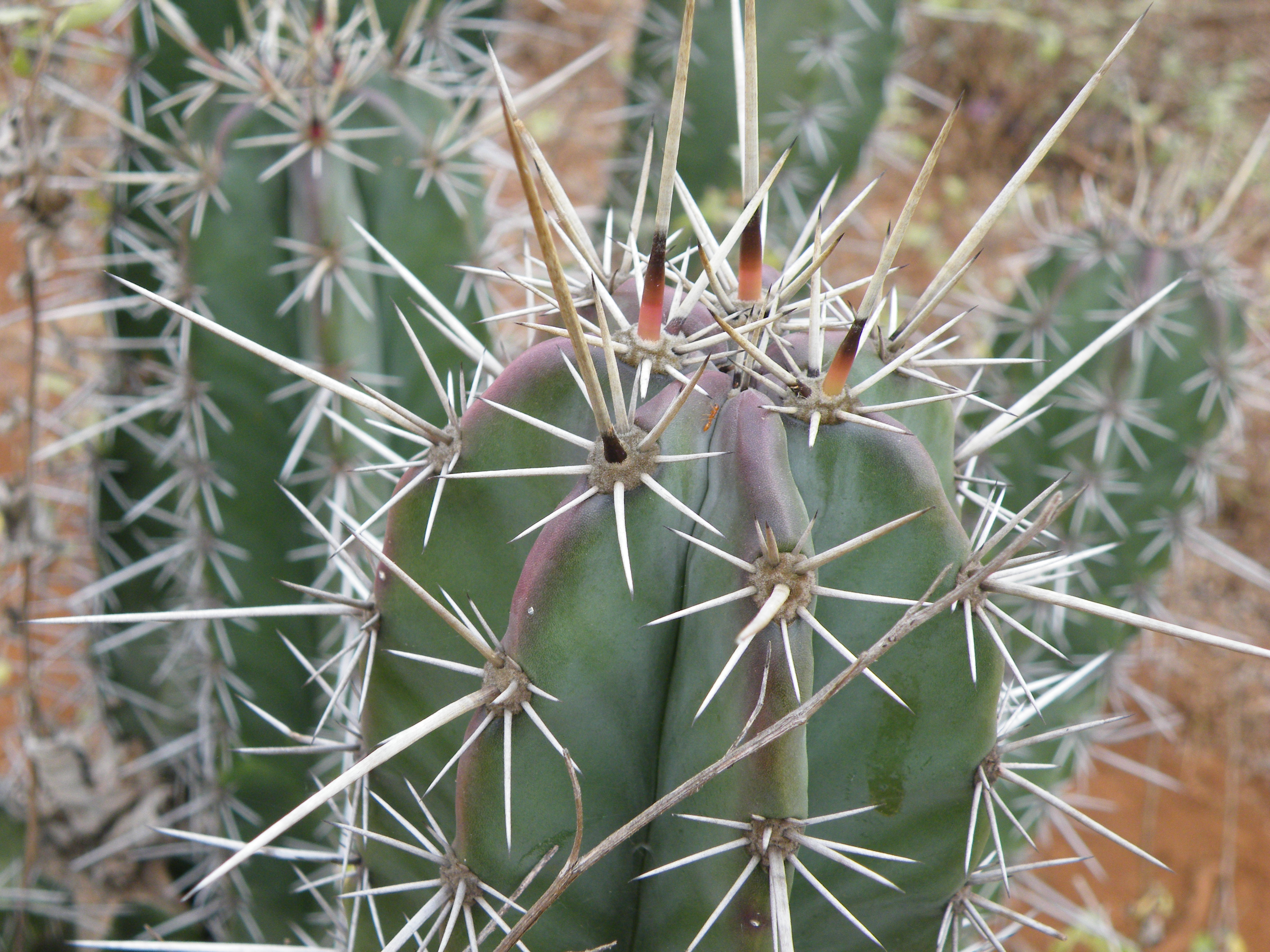
Top of stem

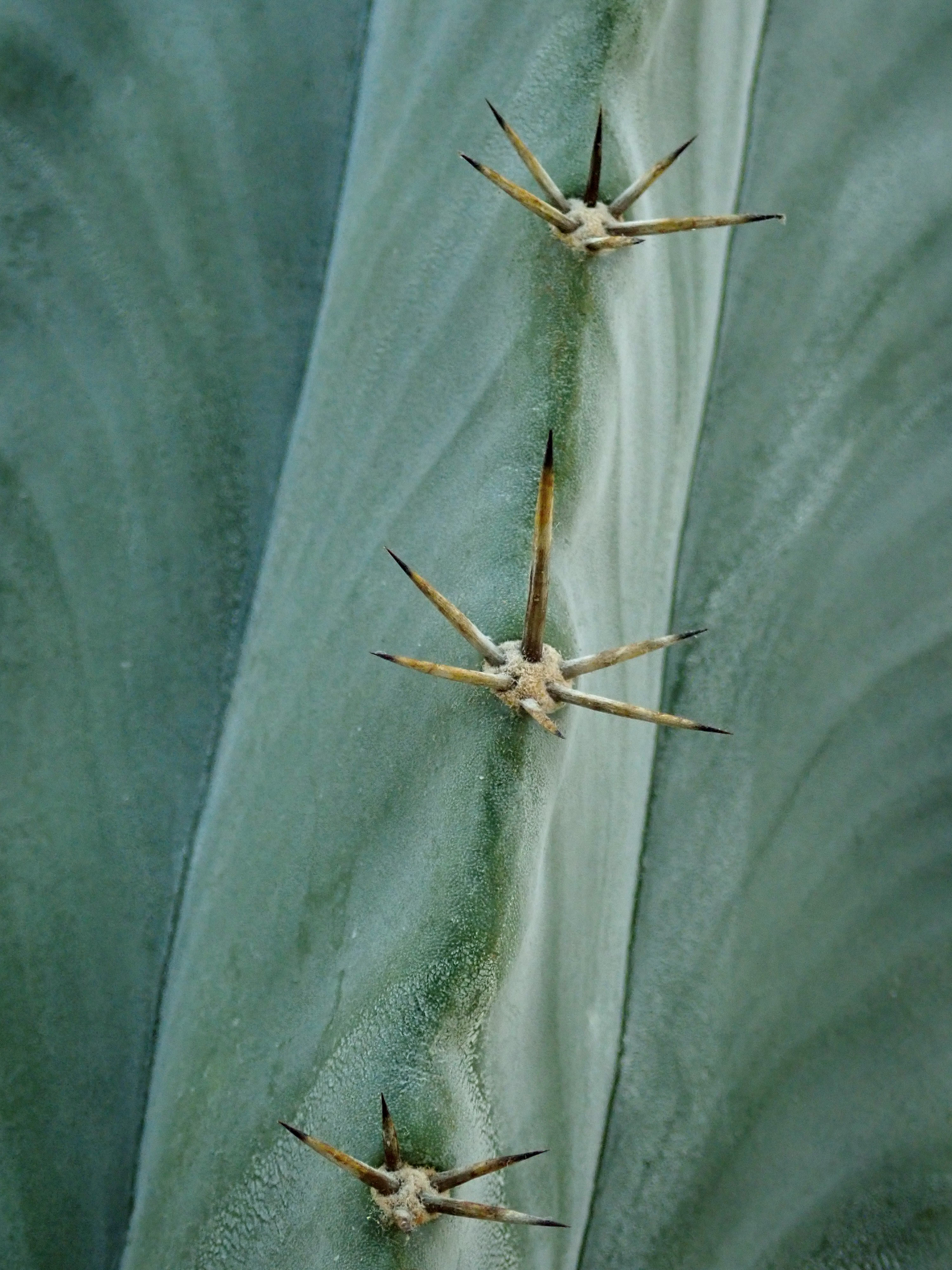
Closeup on areoles and spines

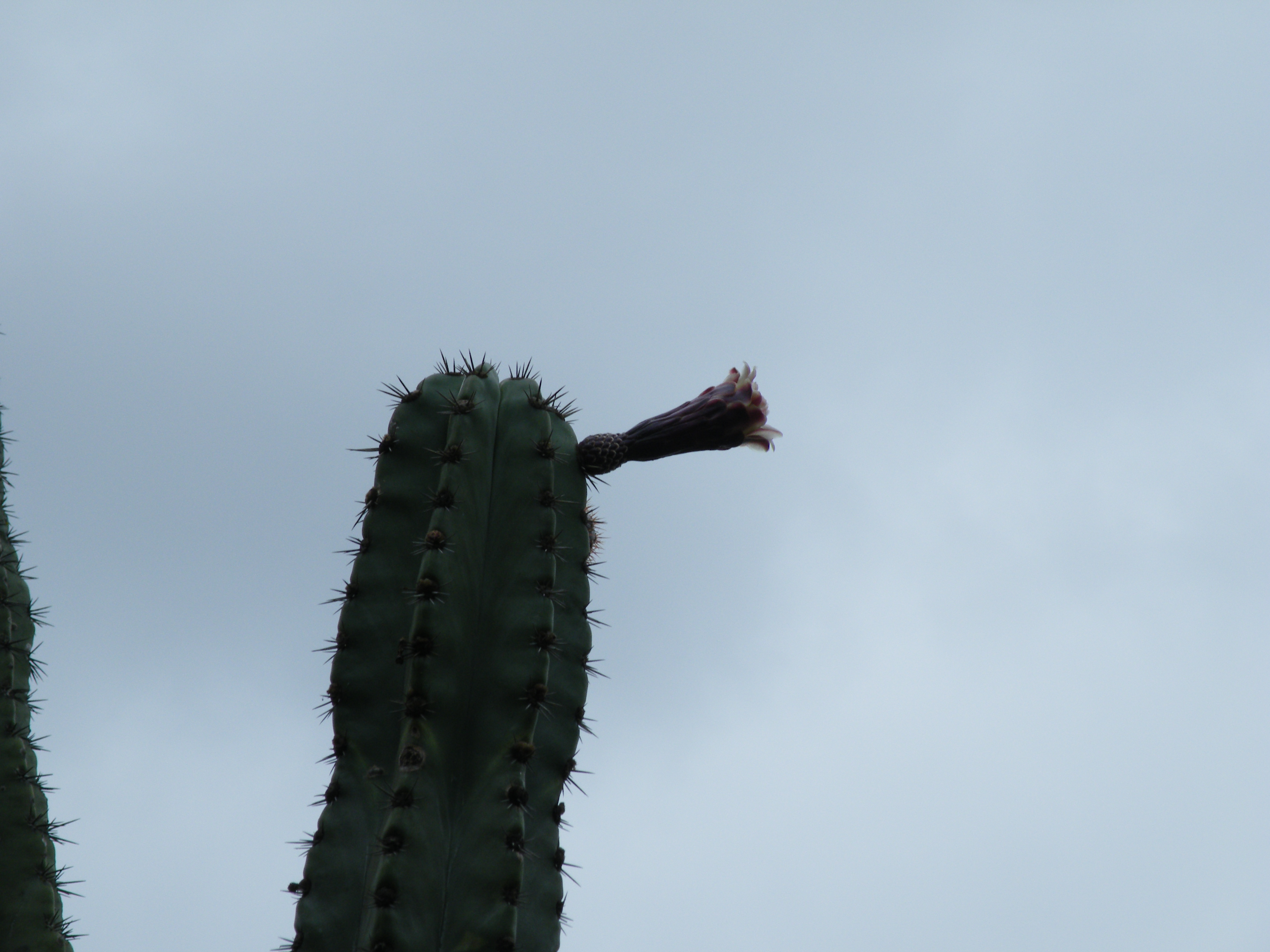
Flower

== Distribution ==
Stenocereus pruinosus is found growing in deciduous forest in the Mexican states of Chiapas, Guerrero, Oaxaca, Puebla, San Luis Potosí, Tamaulipas and Veracruz at an altitude of 800 to 1900 meters. Plants are found growing along with Bursera morelensis, Cephalocereus fulviceps, Myrtillocactus eichlamii, Stenocereus stellatus, Lophocereus marginatus, Deamia chontalensis, Pilosocereus quadricentralis, Lemaireocereus hollianus, Polaskia chichipe, Isolatocereus dumortieri, and Escontria chiotilla.

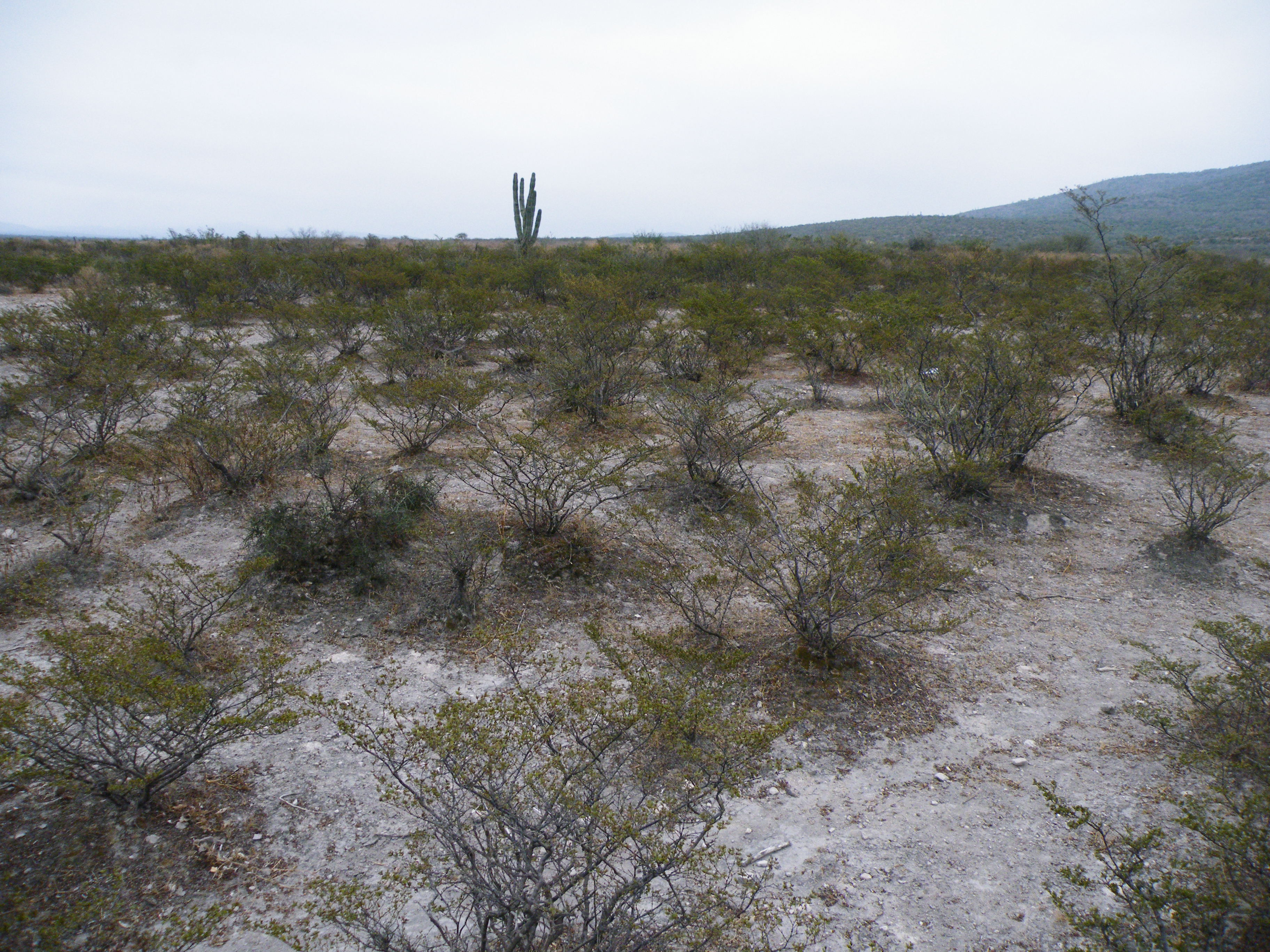
Scrub habitat in Rioverde, San Luis Potosí

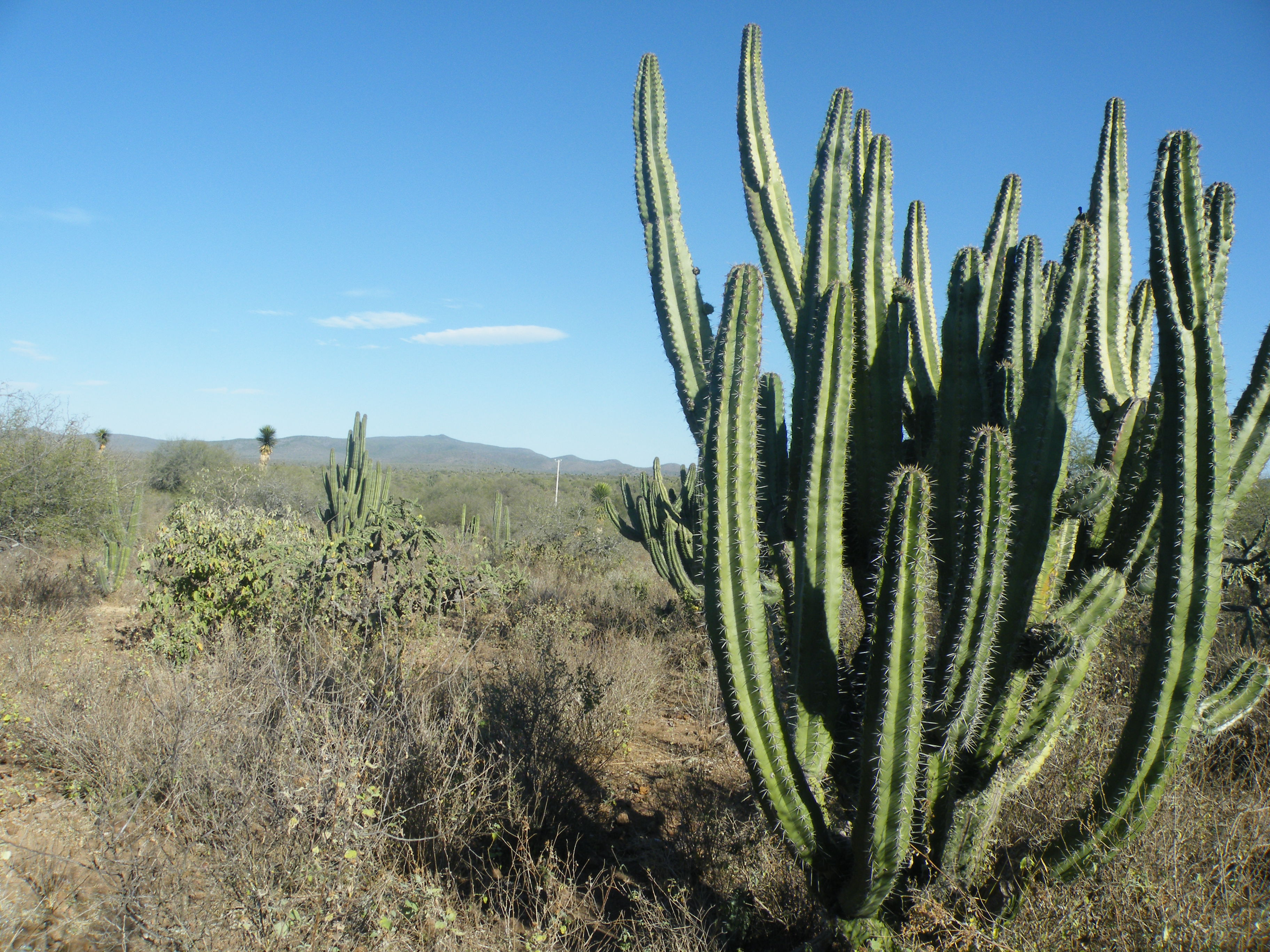
Habitat on the route towards Santa Rita from Rioverde, San Luis Potosí

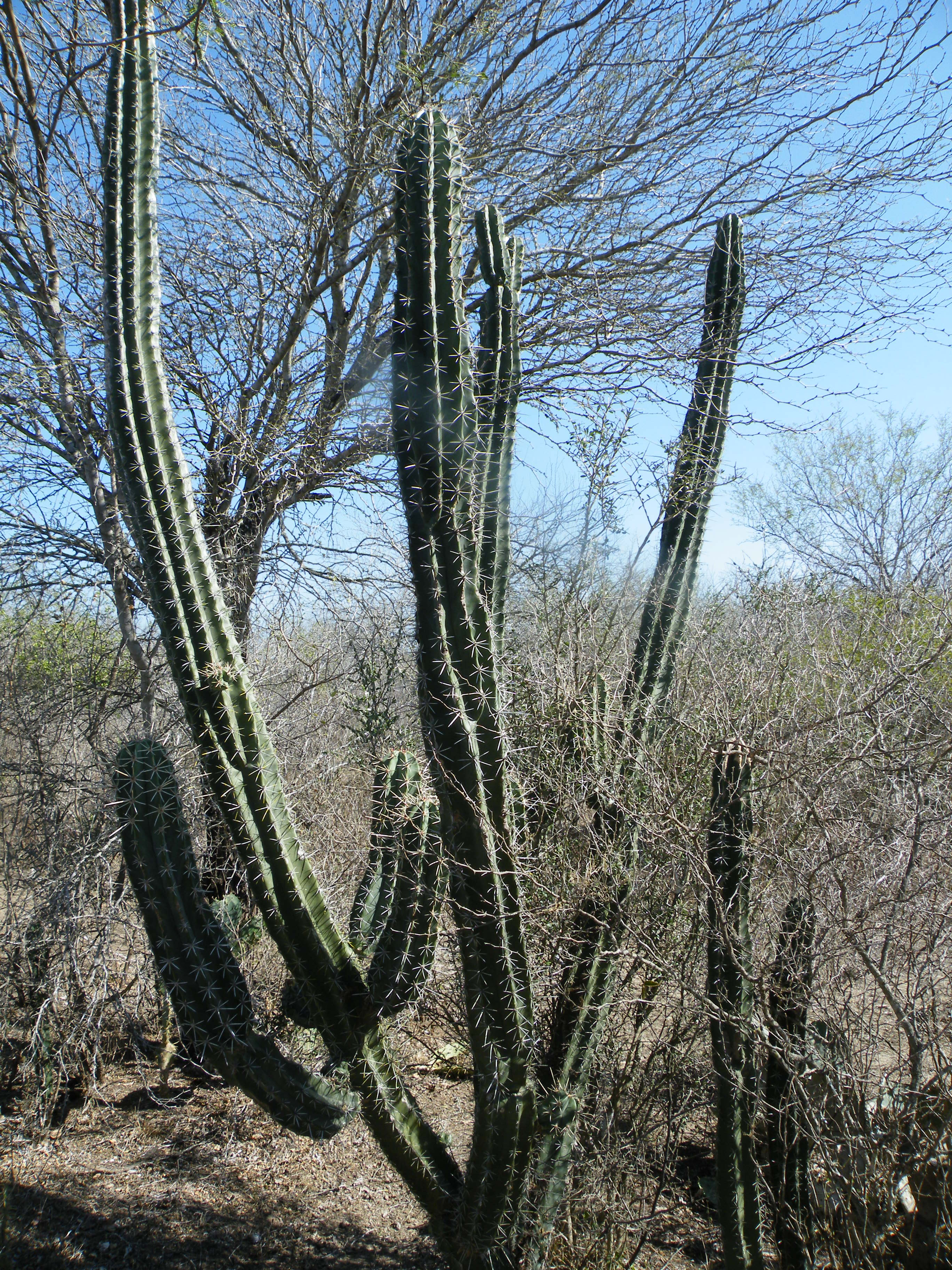
Habitat in Estacion calles, Tamaulipas

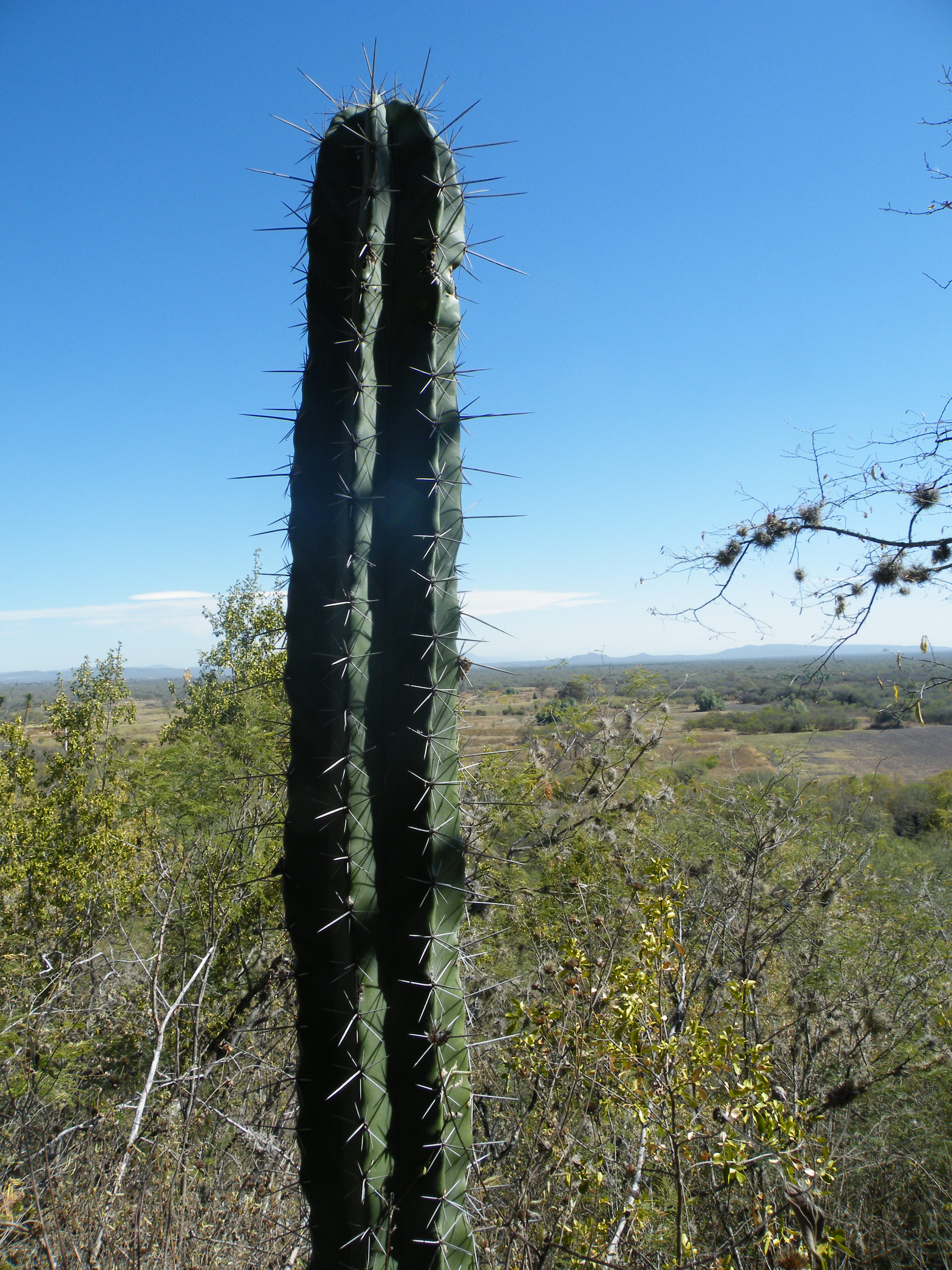
Habitat near Villa Juarez, San Luis Potosi

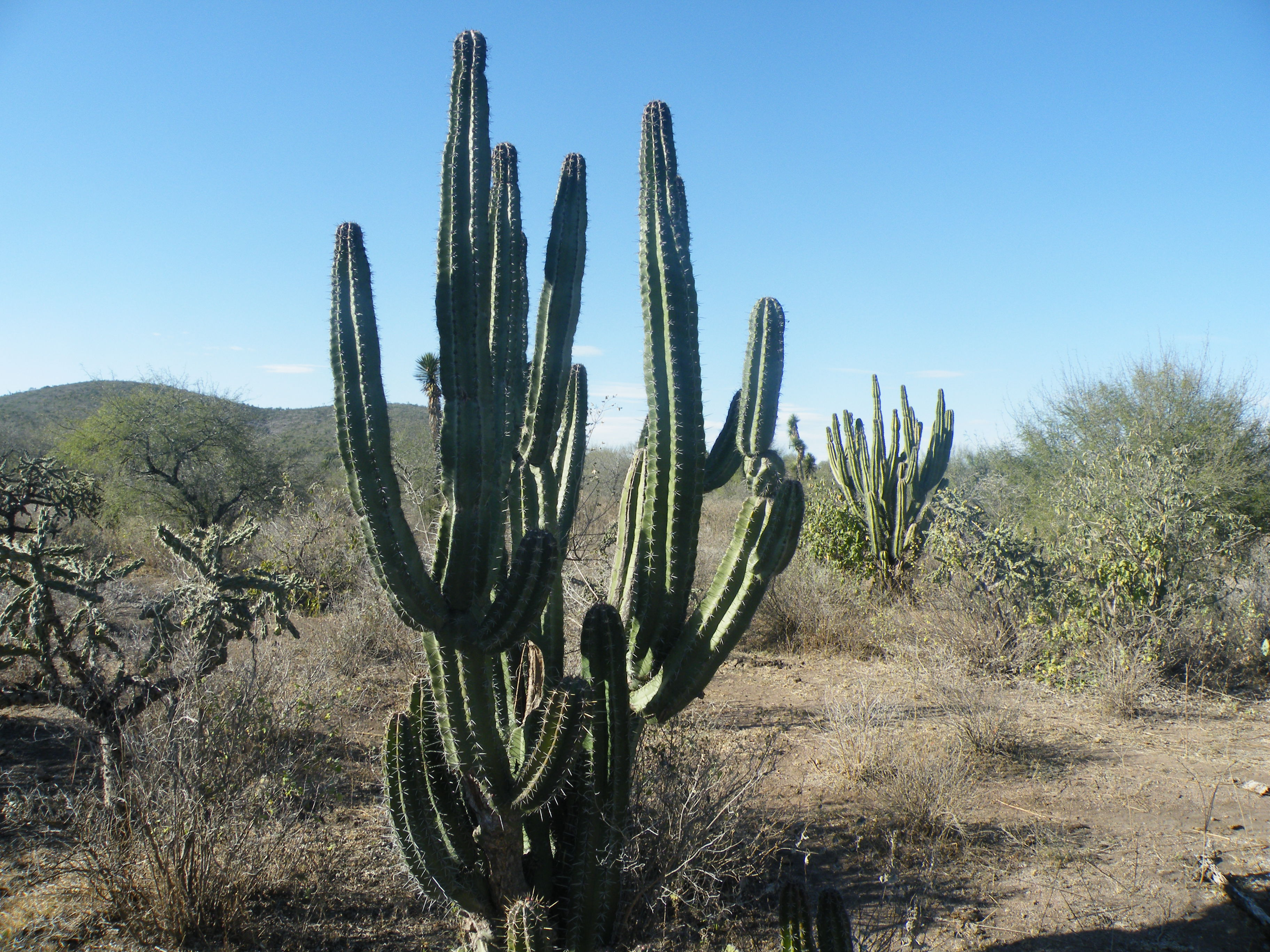
Habitat on the route towards Santa Rita from Rioverde, San Luis Potosí

== Taxonomy ==
The plant was first described as Echinocactus pruinosus in 1837 by Ludwig Georg Karl Pfeiffer. The specific epithet pruinosus comes from Latin and means 'frosted'. Franz Buxbaum placed the species in the genus Stenocereus in 1961

== Uses ==
Because of its edible fruit, this species is a valuable food source in its native range, Mexico, being harvested and sold in many rural markets.
