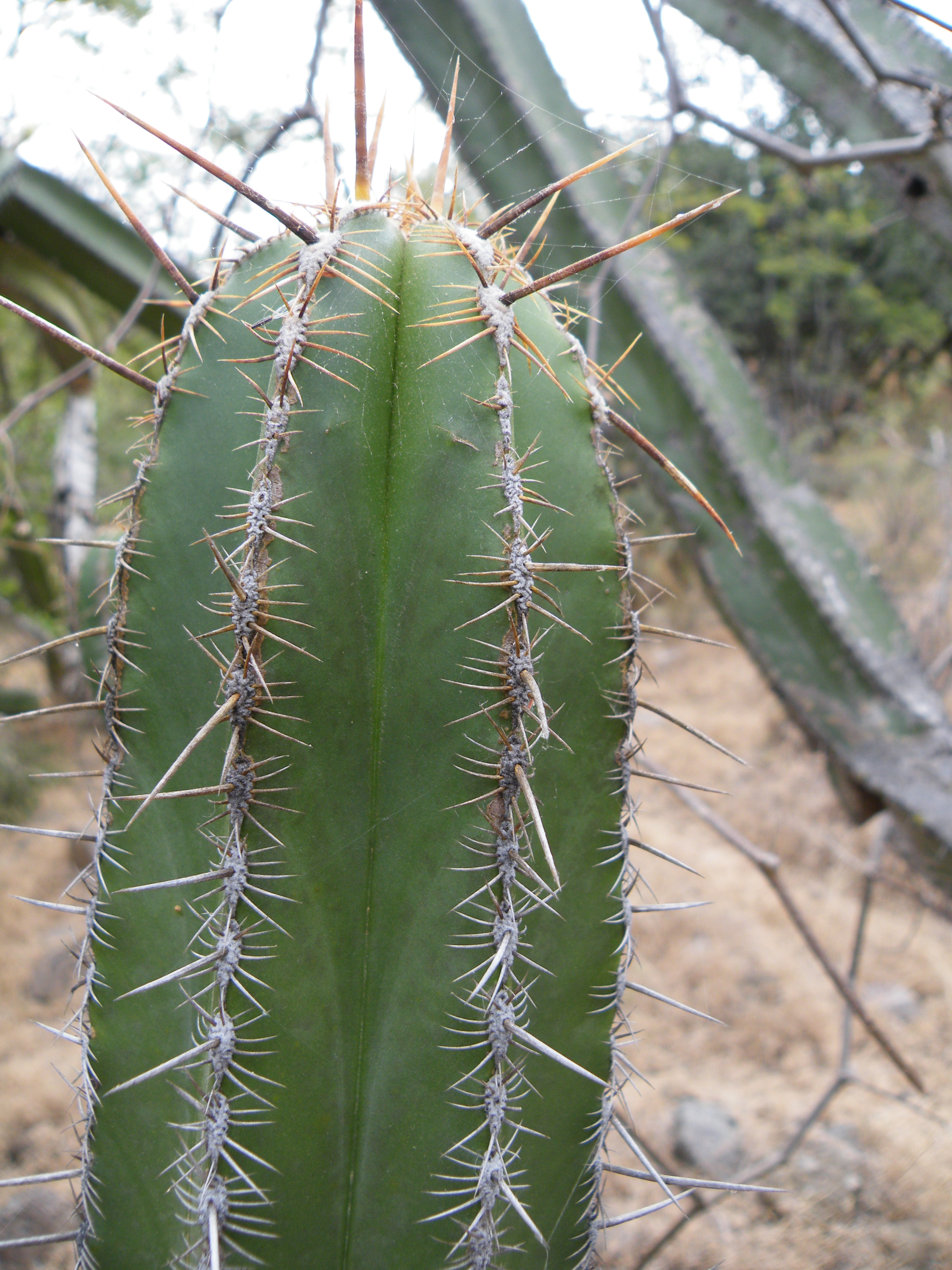
- Chiotilla cactus
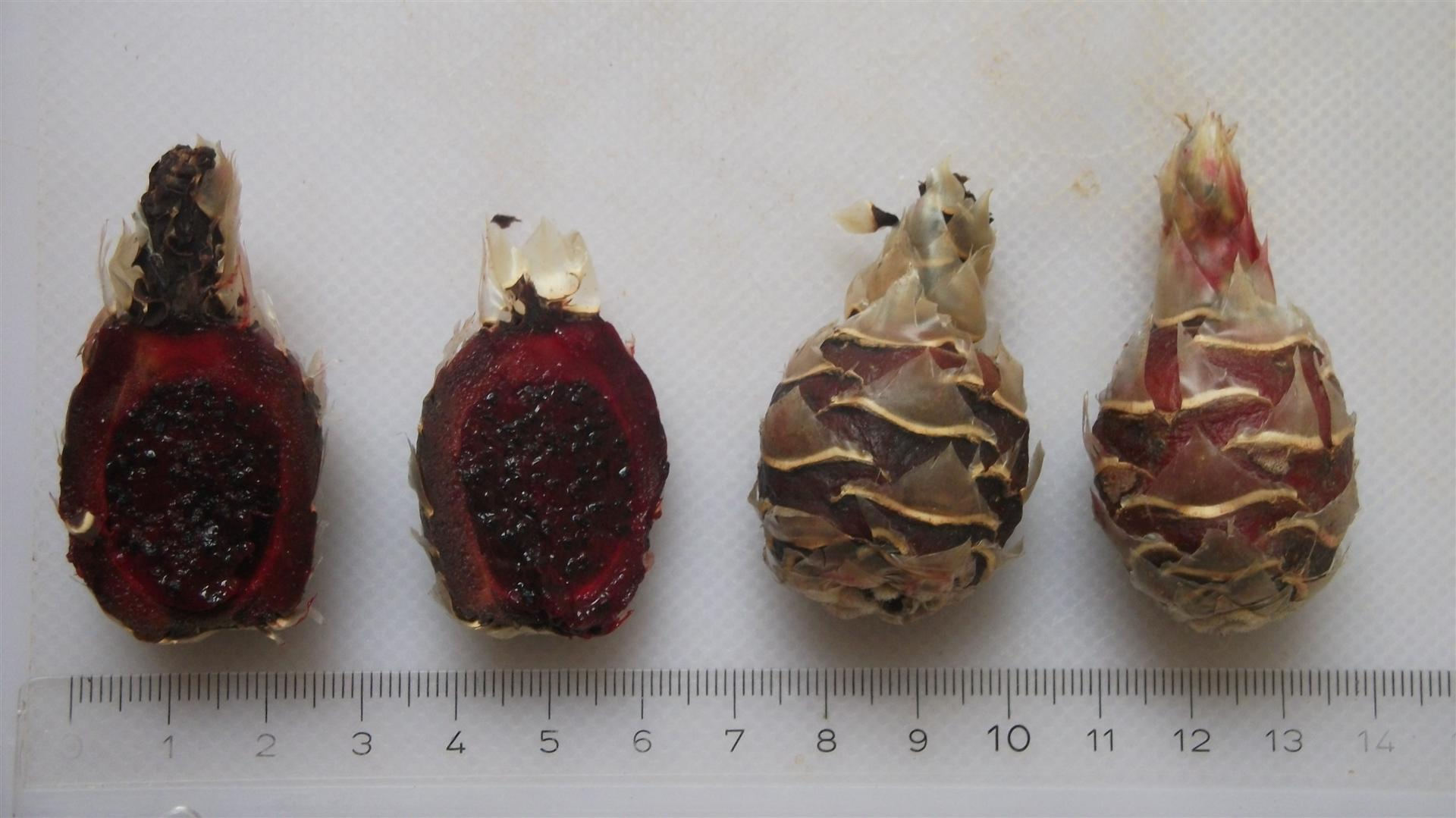
- Ripe jiotilla fruit

Conservation status
- Least Concern (IUCN 3.1)
- CITES Appendix II

Scientific classification
- Kingdom: Plantae
- Clade: Tracheophytes
- Clade: Angiosperms
- Clade: Eudicots
- Order: Caryophyllales
- Family: Cactaceae
- Subfamily: Cactoideae
- Tribe: Echinocereeae
- Genus: Escontria; Rose
- Species: E. chiotilla

Binomial name
- Escontria chiotilla (F.A.C.Weber) Rose

Synonyms
- Cereus chiotilla F.A.C.Weber; Myrtillocactus chiotilla F.A.C.Weber

= Escontria =

Chiotilla

Genus of cacti

Escontria is a genus of cactus. The only species is Escontria chiotilla, the chiotilla or jiotilla.

== Description ==
The tree-like Escontria chiotilla is heavily branched with flat tops, forms clear trunks and reaches a height of 4 to 7 meters. The light green, cylindrical shoots have a diameter of 8 to 12 cm (3.1 to 4.7 in). It has 7 or 8 acute ribs, are densely covered with dark gray, elongated areoles that sometimes flow into one another. The central spine, which is usually one red-orange to yellow, later turns gray and is up to 20 mm (0.79 in) long. The 10 to 20 marginal spines, sometimes arranged somewhat comb-shaped, are yellowish-brown, later become grayish-white and are up to 12 mm (0.47 in) long.

The yellow, tubular to somewhat bell-shaped flowers, which open during the day, appear below the shoot tip. It bears dark red fruit comparable in appearance and texture to Pitaya, but smaller (3,5 cm). The spherical, fleshy, scaled fruits are purple-brown and have a diameter of 5 cm (2.0 in) or more.

== Distribution ==
The species originates from Mexico (Guerrero, Michoacán, Oaxaca, southern Puebla).

== Taxonomy ==
The first plants were discovered in 1864 by Frédéric Albert Constantin Weber, who sent material to George Engelmann. However, the first description as Cereus chiotilla was not made until 1897 by Karl Moritz Schumann. The botanical name of the genus honors the Mexican engineer and temporary governor of San Luis Potosí Blas Escontria and Bustamante (1848–1906). The specific epithet chiotilla derives from the local name "Chiotilla" for the edible fruits of the plant. Spanish common names are "Chiotilla" and "Jiotilla". In 1906, Joseph Nelson Rose placed it in the genus Escontria, which he had established.

Another nomenclature synonym is Myrtillocactus chiotilla (F.A.C.Weber ex K.Schum.) P.V.Heath (1992).
