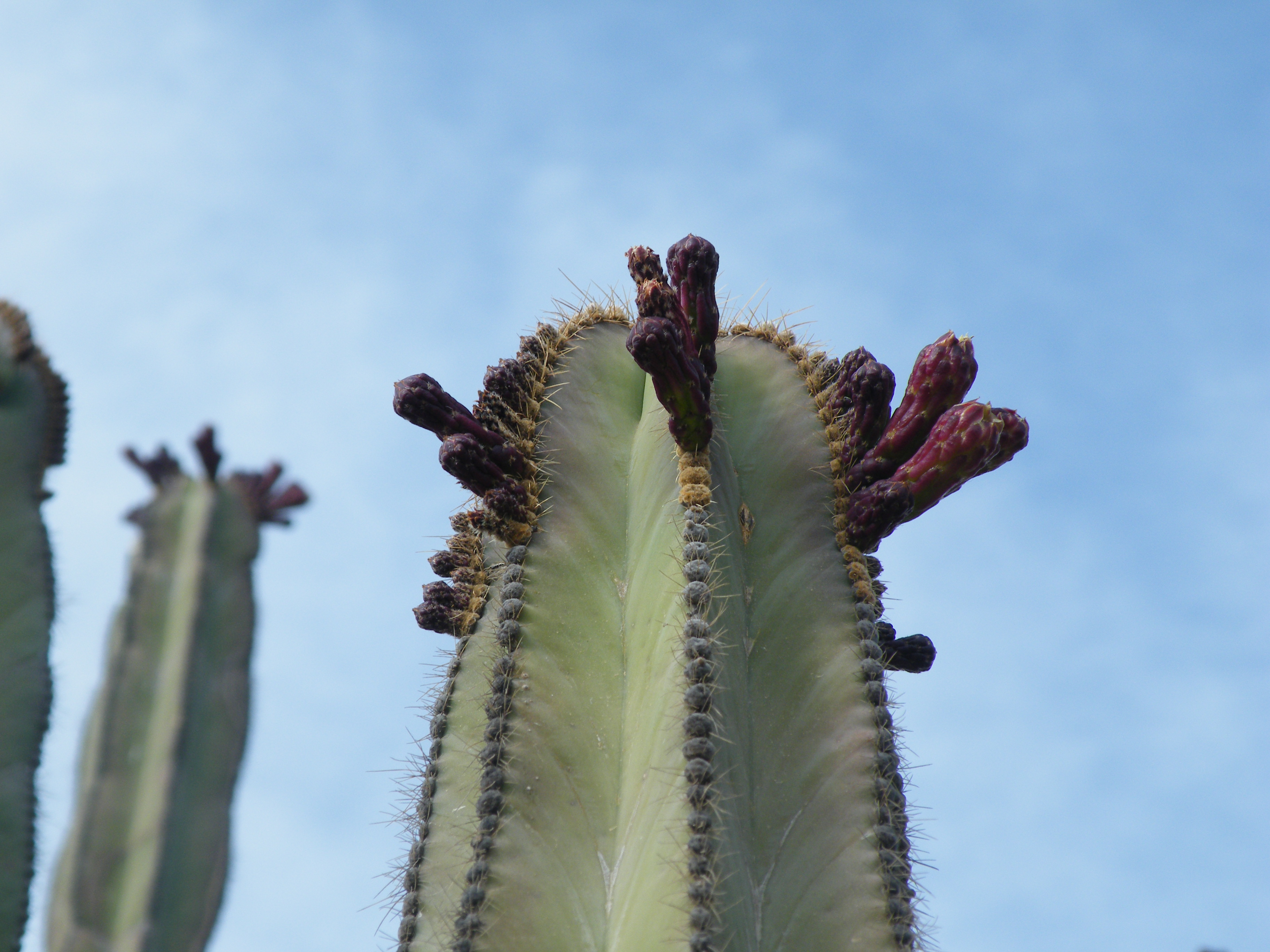

Conservation status
- Least Concern (IUCN 3.1)

Scientific classification
- Kingdom: Plantae
- Clade: Tracheophytes
- Clade: Angiosperms
- Clade: Eudicots
- Order: Caryophyllales
- Family: Cactaceae
- Subfamily: Cactoideae
- Tribe: Echinocereeae
- Genus: Isolatocereus; Backeb. 1942
- Species: I. dumortieri

Binomial name
- Isolatocereus dumortieri (Scheidw.) Buxb. 1999
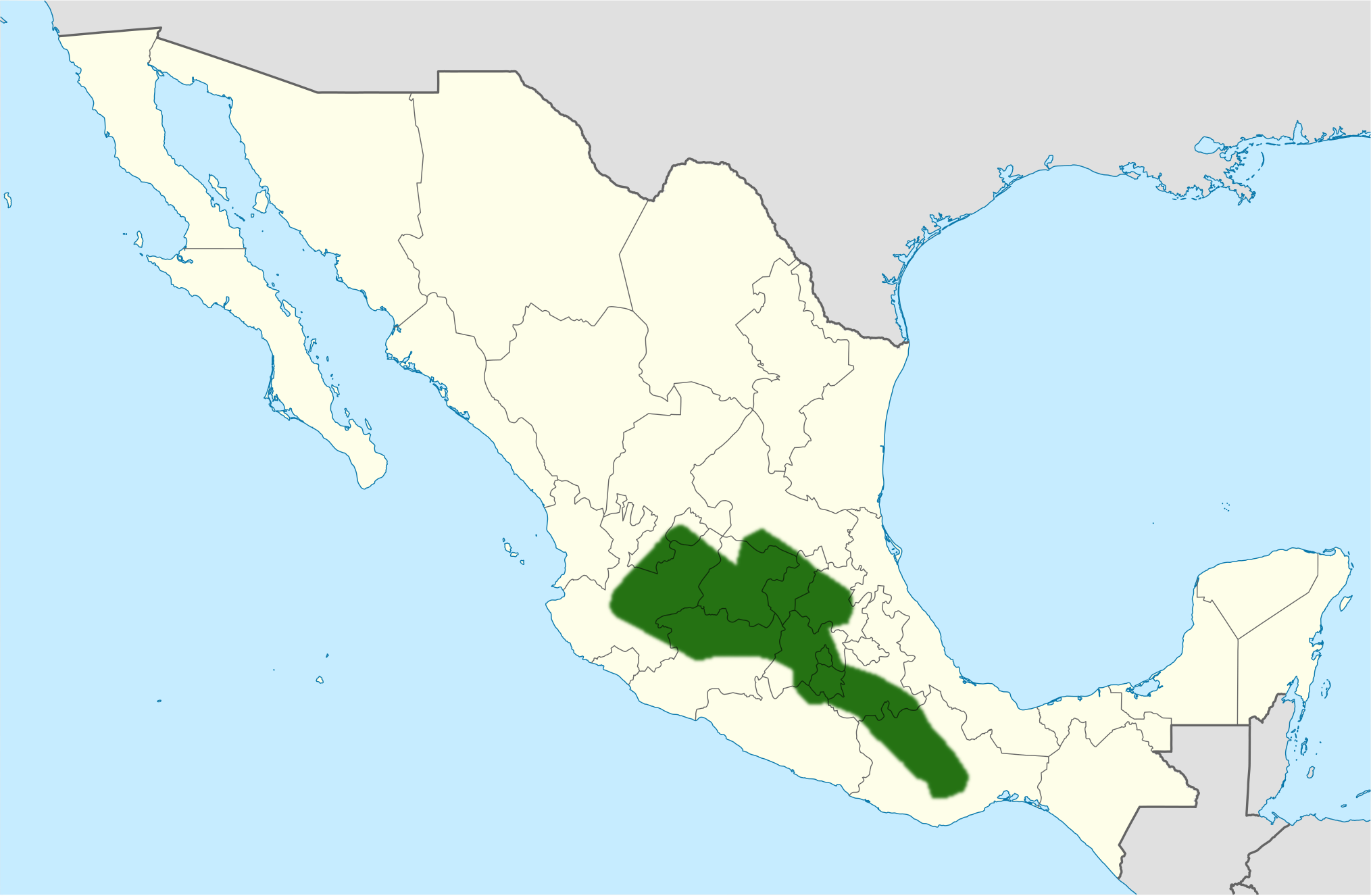

Synonyms
- Cereus dumortieri Scheidw. 1837; Rathbunia dumortieri (Scheidw.) P.V.Heath 1992; Stenocereus dumortieri (Scheidw.) Buxb. 1961; Lemaireocereus dumortieri Britton & Rose 1909

= Isolatocereus =

Species of cactus

Isolatocereus is a monotypic genus of flowering plant in the family Cactaceae. The only species is Isolatocereus dumortieri that is found in Mexico.

== Description ==
Isolatocereus dumortieri is a large, tree-like, and candelabra-shaped cactus, grows to heights of 5–15 meters, with a trunk exceeding 1-1.5 meter in length and about 35 cm in width. It is blue-green, covered with grayish wax. Branches erect, parallel to each other, all almost the same length, curved at the base, with the apex attenuated, up to 10 meters long and 5–15 cm in diameter. The cactus has 5–8 bluntly triangular ribs up to 2 cm high, and its areoles are dark. It features 1–4 yellowish-white central spines up to 5 cm long and 6–9 shorter reddish-brown wool and some short, bristly radial spines that darken over time, reaching 1 cm in length.

The scentless tubular flowers grow near the shoot tips and bloom multiple times, sometimes forming small crowns. They are mostly self-incompatible. They open at night and remain open until midday, appearing pale green to white, tubular to funnel-shaped, and 2.5–3.5 cm long. The edible fruits are subglobose to ellipsoid, remain green for some time, then turn orange to red, and measure 2.5–3.5 cm in length. They are covered in small red scales and contain black seeds approximately 1.5 mm in size.Fruits have red pulp, 3 to 4 cm long and 2 to 3.5 cm wide, covered with short podaries arranged in 4 series, with areoles provided with a reduced deltoid basal scab and short emerging felt, with very short spines, dehiscent at its apical part, giving off a pleasant aroma similar to that of jasmine, very juicy, fleshy and sweet when ripe

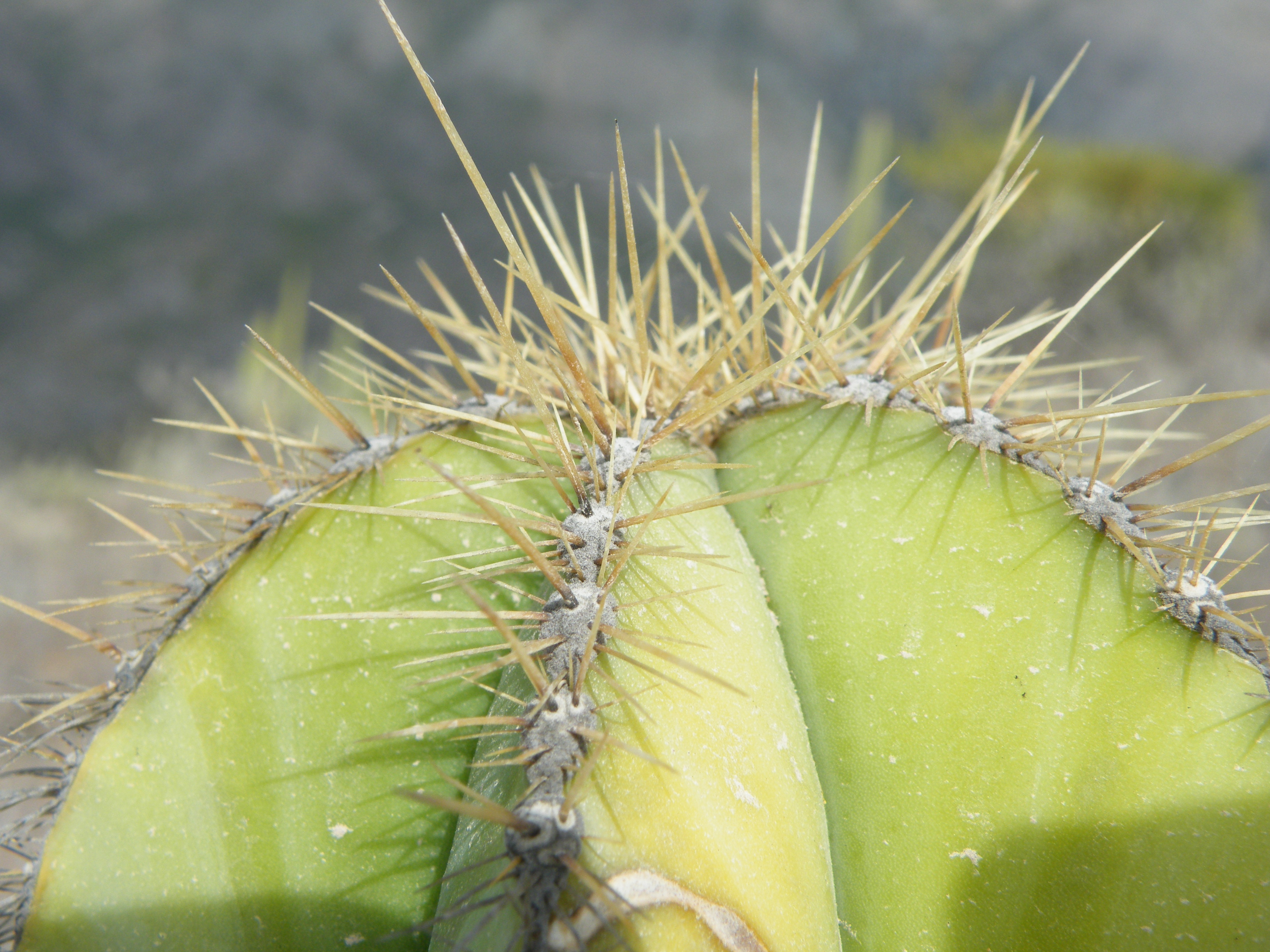
Top of plant

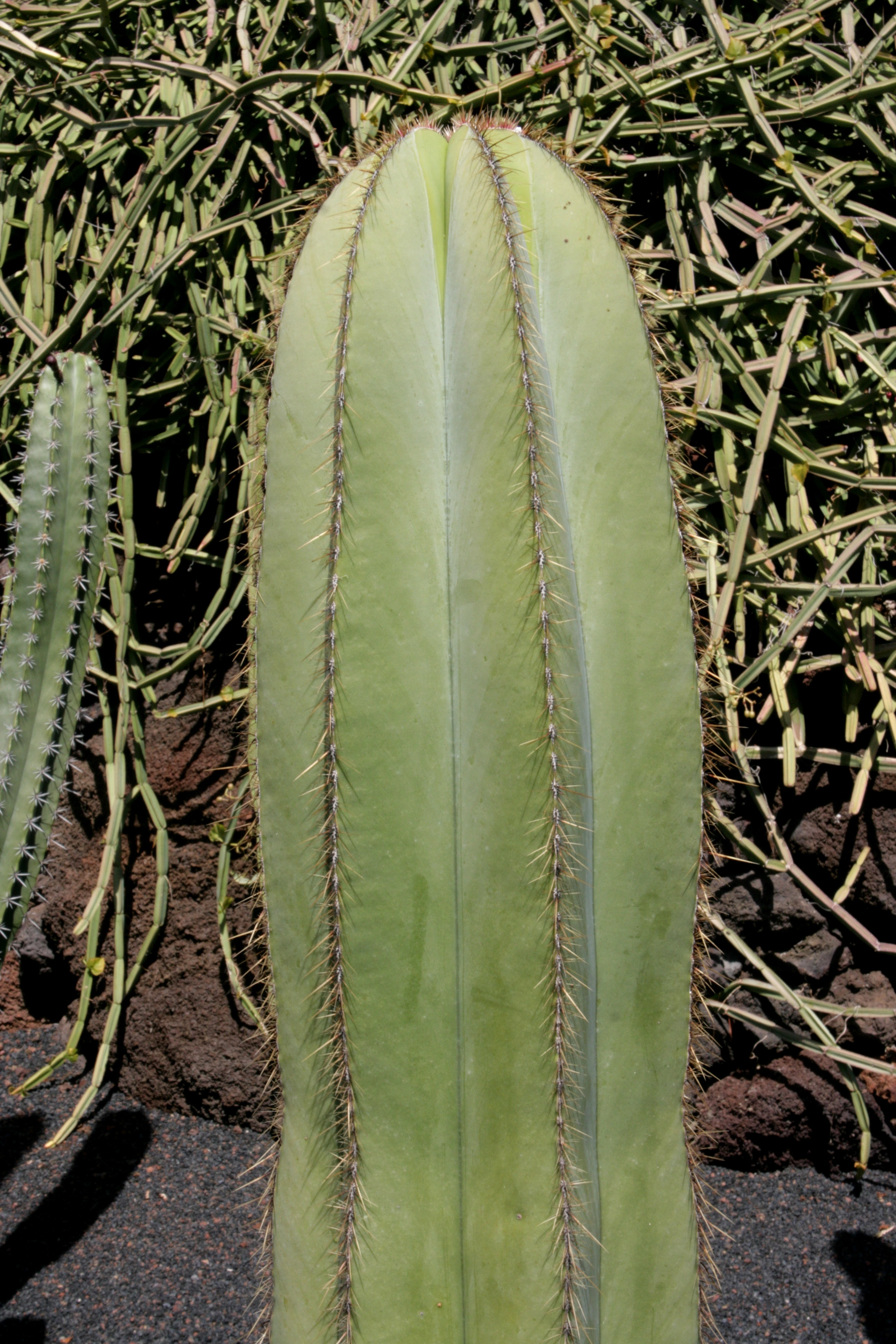
Stem

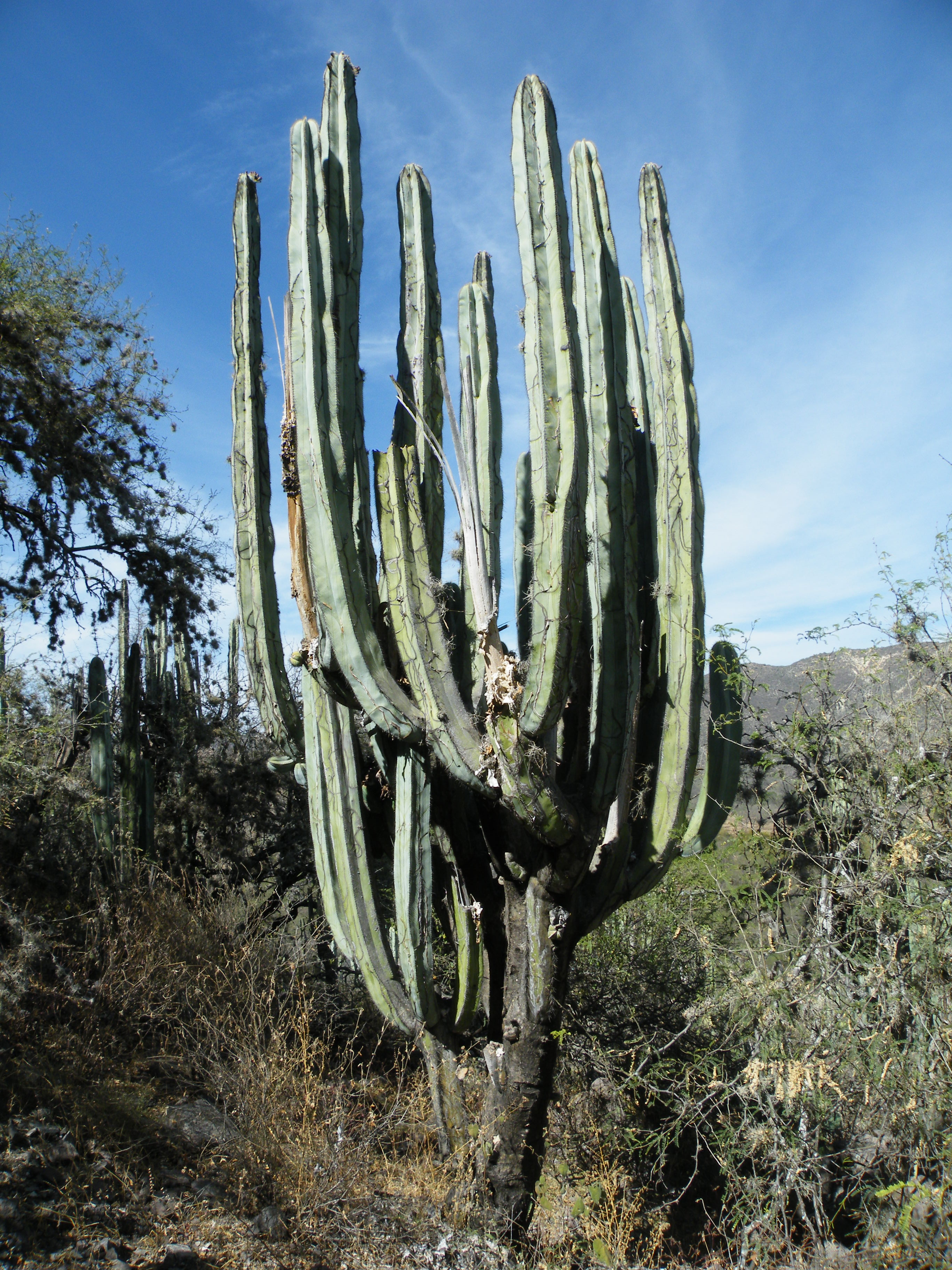
Adult plant

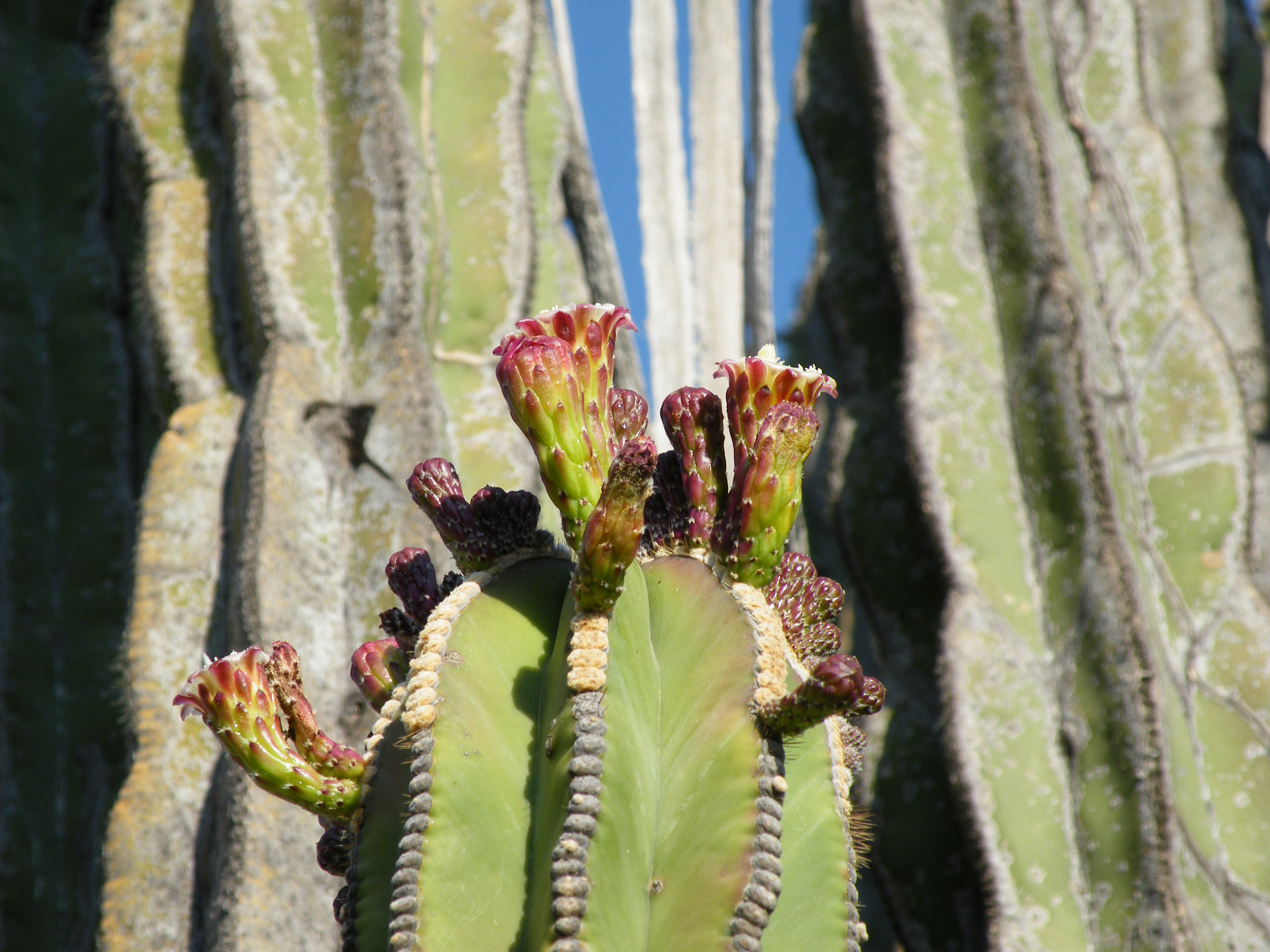
Flowers

== Distribution ==
Isolatocereus dumortieri is native to several Mexican states, including Aguascalientes, Guanajuato, Guerrero, Hidalgo, Jalisco, México, Michoacán, Morelos, Oaxaca, Puebla, Querétaro, San Luis Potosí, Veracruz, and Zacatecas at elevations between 1100 and 2200 meters. Plants are found in deciduous forest, grasslands growing on slopes or rocky cliffs growing along with Cephalocereus senilis. The flowers are pollinated animals that feed on the nectar including hummingbirds such as Amazilia violiceps, Cynanthus sordidus, and Cynanthus latirostris; bat such as Leptonycteris yerbabuenae, Leptonycteris nivalis, Glossophaga soricina, Choeronycteris mexicana, Sturnira lilium parvidens, and Dermanura tolteca; and bees. The seeds are dispersed by bats and Bassariscus astutus which eats the fruits.

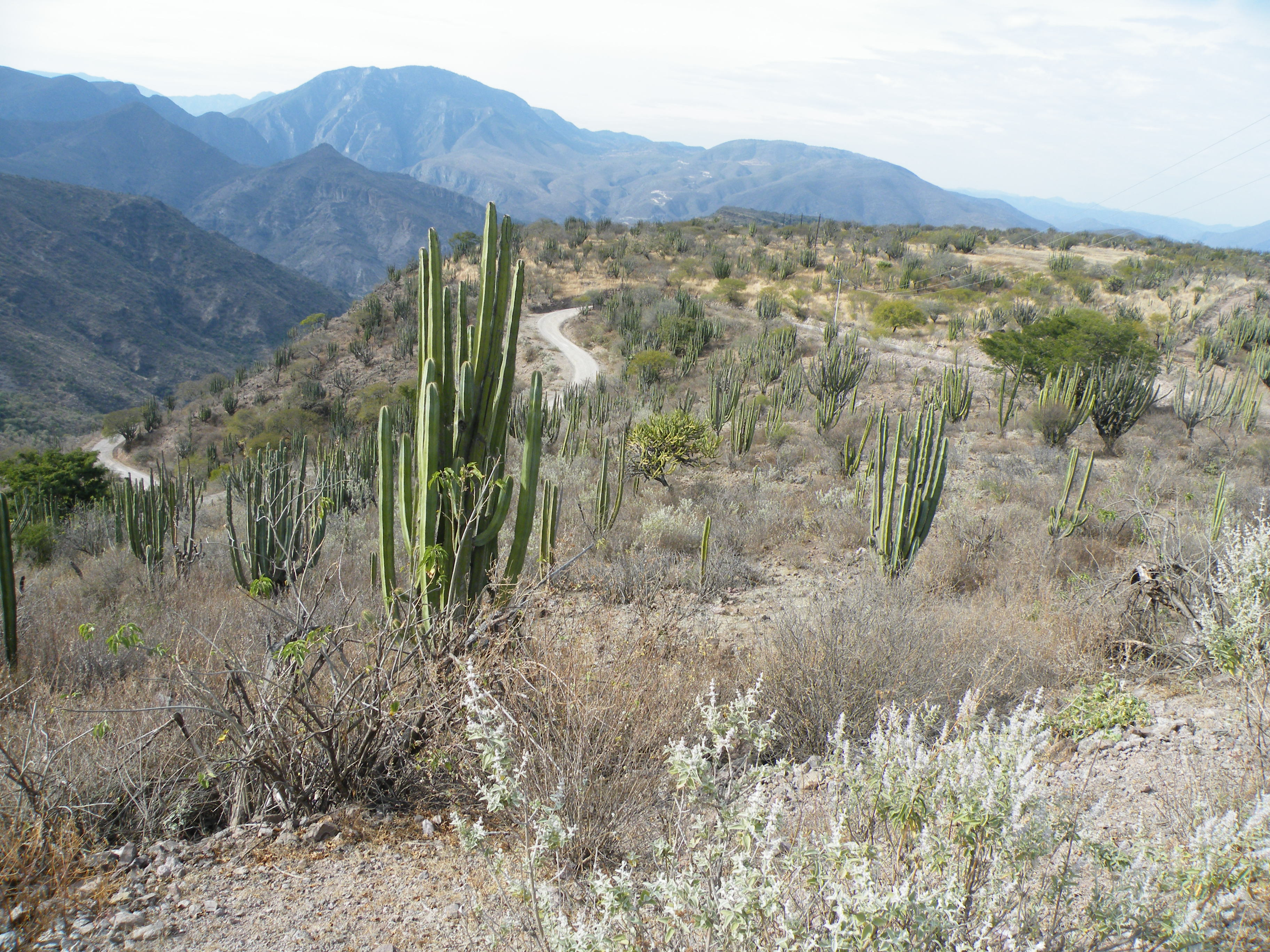
Habitat in east Guamúchil, Guanajuato

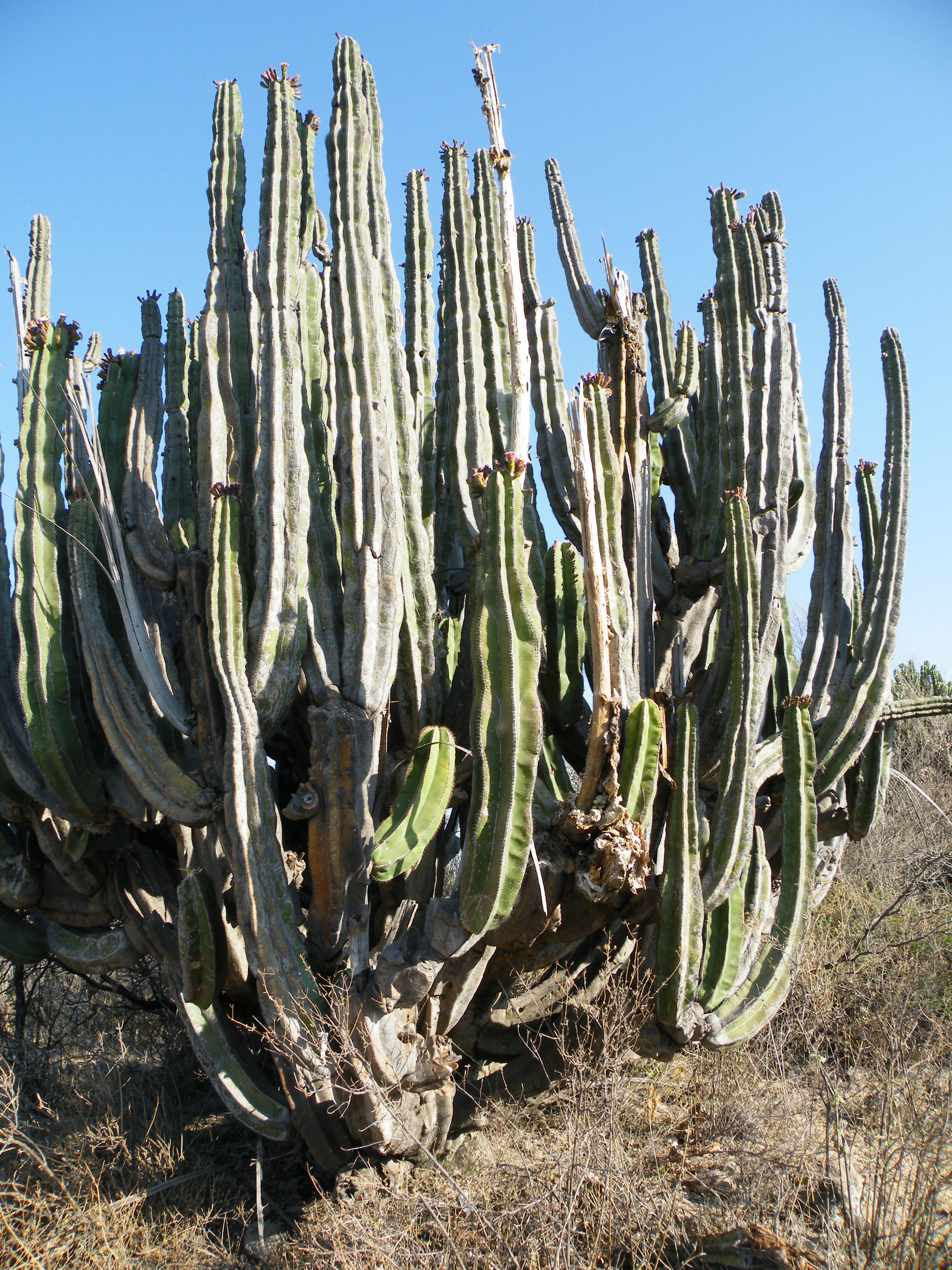
Plant growing in habitat in Tequisquiapan, Querétaro

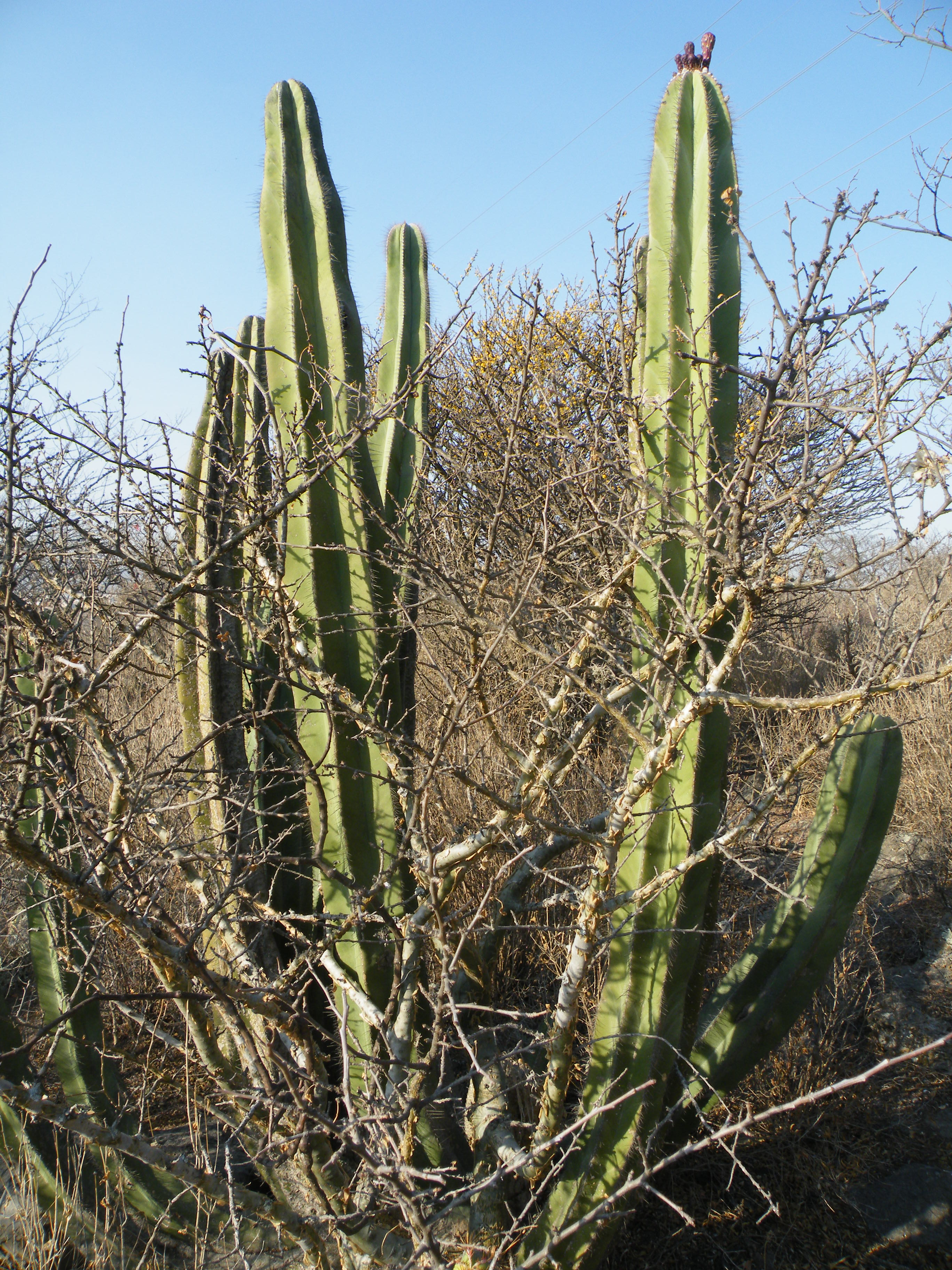
Plant growing in Querétaro, Querétaro

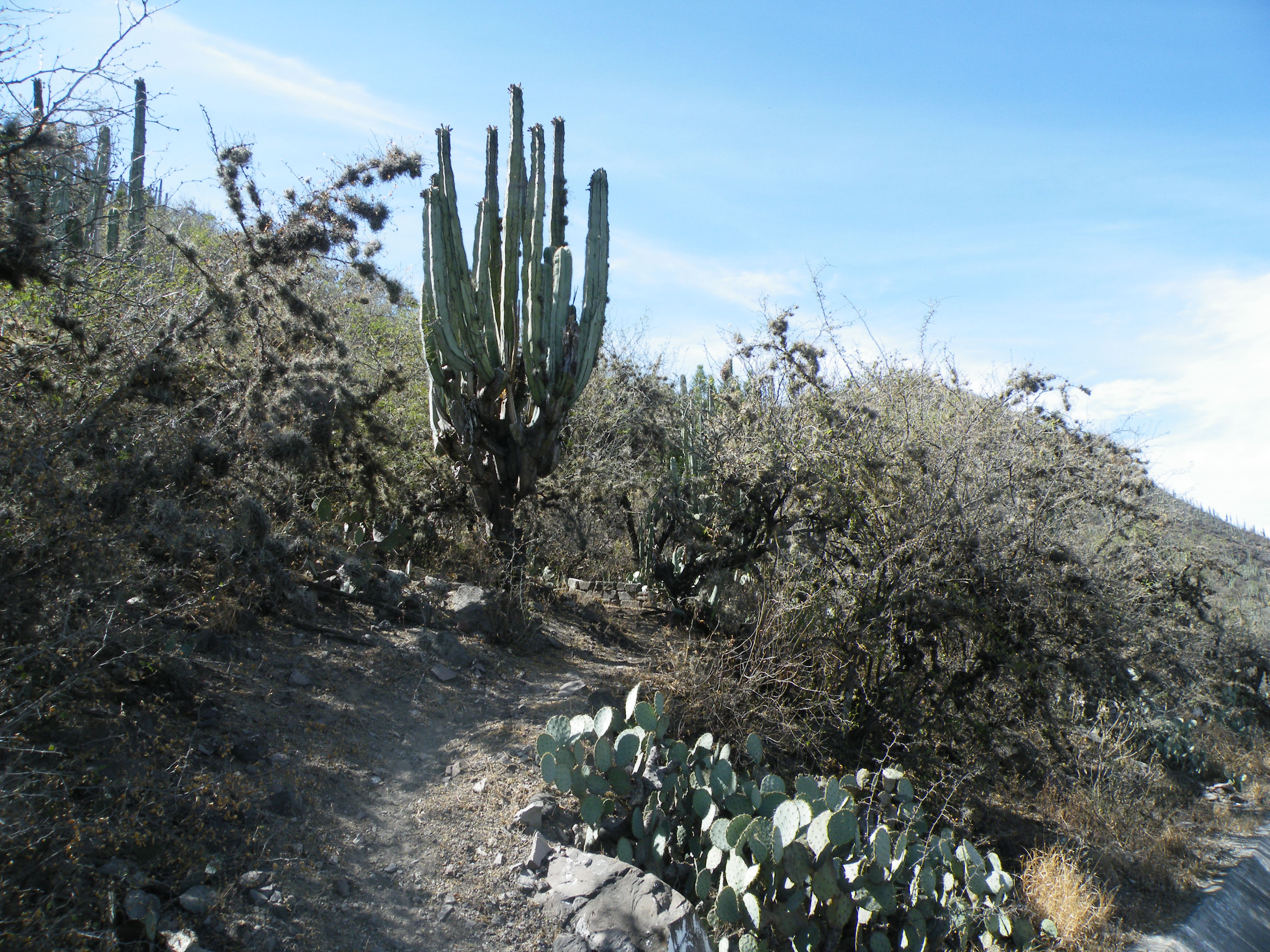
Plant growing in habitat near Río Venados, Hidalgo

== Taxonomy ==
First described as Cereus dumortieri by Michael Joseph François Scheidweiler in 1837, the genus name "Isolatocereus" derives from the Italian word isolato (isolated). The species name honors Belgian botanist Barthélemy Charles Joseph Dumortier. It is also known by the common names "Candelabro," "Órgano," and "Pitayo." Curt Backeberg established the genus Isolatocereus in 1942, placing this species within it. Isolatocereus was split from Stenocereus into a separate genus (not all authorities had agreed with this as of 2008).

== Sources ==
- Yetman, D. (2008). The Great Cacti: Ethnobotany and Biogeography. Southwest Center Series. University of Arizona Press. ISBN 978-0-8165-4637-4.
