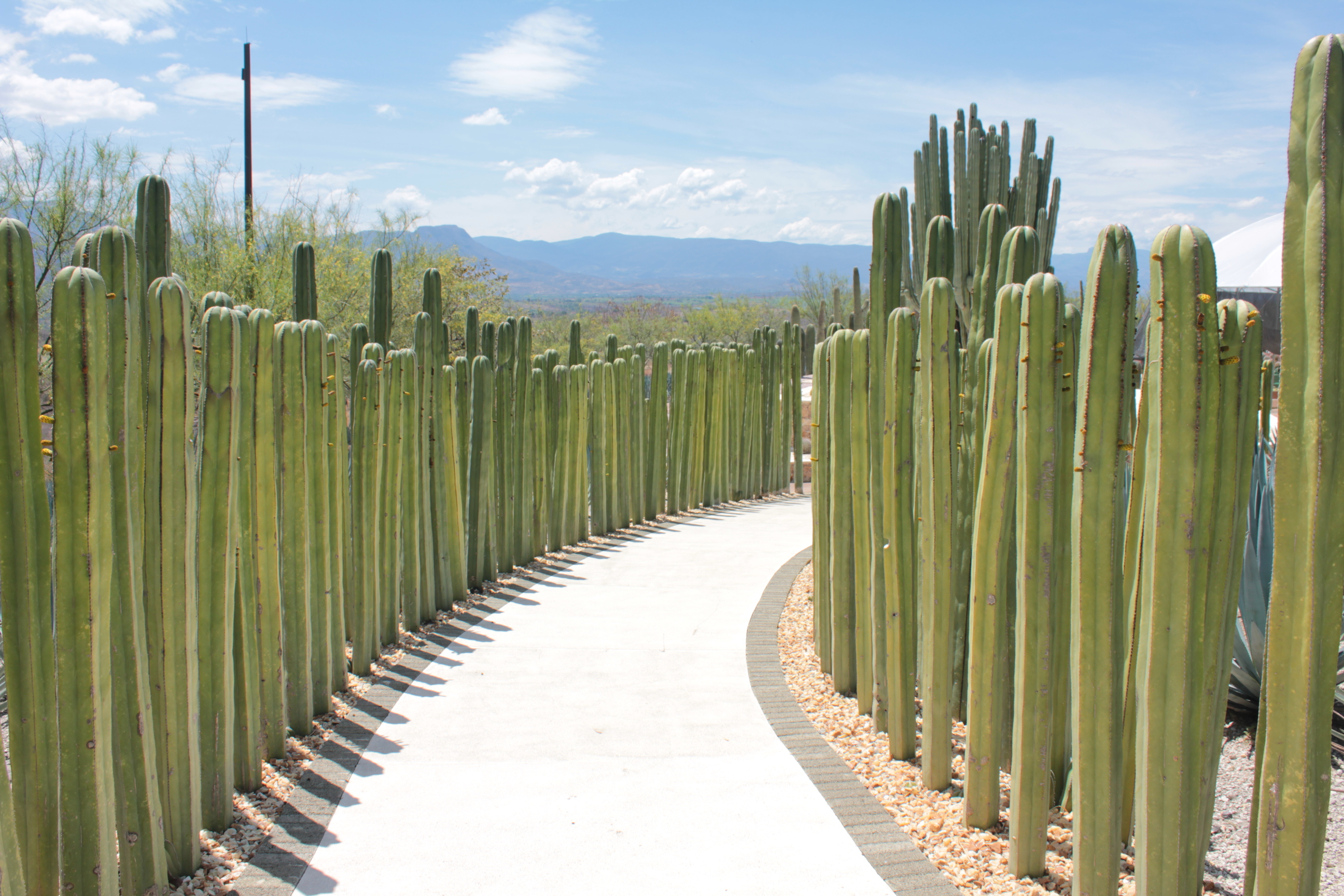
- Marginatocereus marginatus grown as a fence post

Scientific classification
- Kingdom: Plantae
- Clade: Tracheophytes
- Clade: Angiosperms
- Clade: Eudicots
- Order: Caryophyllales
- Family: Cactaceae
- Subfamily: Cactoideae
- Genus: Marginatocereus
- Species: M. marginatus

Binomial name
- Marginatocereus marginatus (DC.) S.Arias & Terrazas

Synonyms
- List: Cereus cupulatus Pfeiff.; Cereus gemmatus Zucc. ex Pfeiff.; Cereus incrustans Steud.; Cereus incrustatus J.Forbes; Cereus marginatus DC.; Cereus marginatus f. gibbosus J.A.Purpus; Cereus mirbelii Pfeiff.; Echinopsis gemmata (Otto ex Pfeiff.) K.Schum.; Lemaireocereus marginatus (DC.) A.Berger; Lophocereus marginatus (DC.) S.Arias & Terrazas; Marginatocereus marginatus (DC.) Backeb.; Marginatocereus marginatus var. oaxacensis Backeb.; Pachycereus marginatus (DC.) Britton & Rose; Pachycereus marginatus var. gemmatus (Otto ex Pfeiff.) P.V.Heath; Pachycereus marginatus f. gibbosus (J.A.Purpus) P.V.Heath; Pachycereus marginatus var. oaxacensis (Backeb.) P.V.Heath; Stenocereus marginatus (DC.) A. Berger & Buxb.; Stenocereus marginatus var. gemmatus (Zucc. ex Pfeiff.) Bravo

= Marginatocereus marginatus =

Species of cactus

Marginatocereus marginatus is a species of plant in the family Cactaceae. It is sometimes called Mexican fencepost cactus.

== Description ==
It has tree-shaped columnar trunks that grow slowly to 12 feet (3.7 m) and may reach 20 feet (6.1 m) in height, rarely branching. Stems are 3 to 4 inches (7.6 to 10.2 centimetres) in diameter, with ribs 4 to 7 in (10 to 18 cm). Its central spine is about 3/8 inch (0.95 cm) in diameter with five to 9 radials and slightly yellowish in color. The five to nine marginal spines are 2 to 4 millimeters long. The large areoles on it later merge. The flowering areoles located near the shoot tips are covered with numerous bristles up to 2 centimeters long.

The funnel-shaped, reddish flowers are 3 to 4 centimeters long. Their pericarpel and floral tube are covered with scales that carry wool and bristles in their axils. The spherical fruits are more or less dry. They reach a diameter of up to 4 centimeters and are covered with slightly sloping thorns and wool.

Its cuttings are sometimes used to create fences, as its spines are not as large or dangerous as some cacti.

== Gallery ==
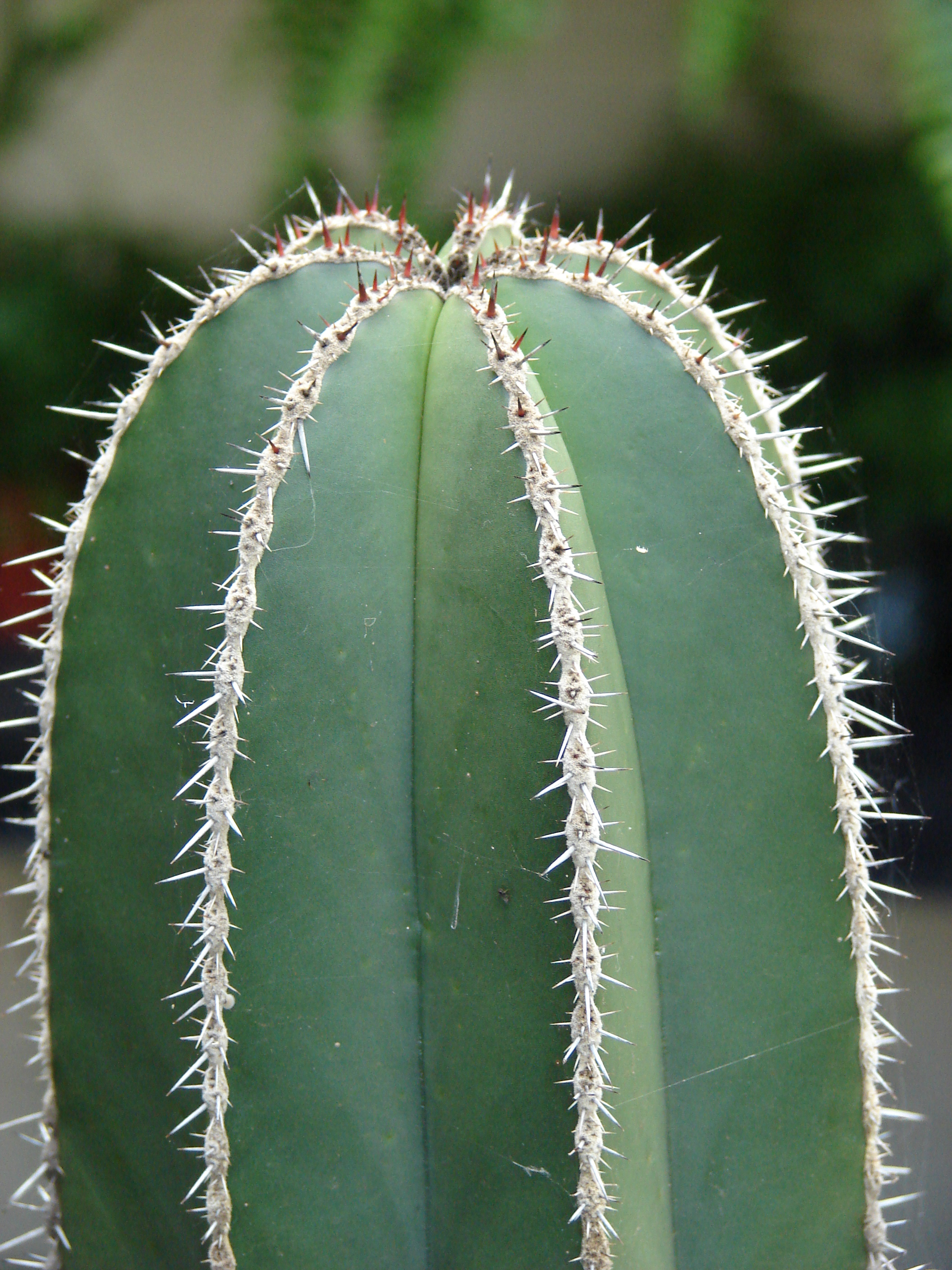
Spines

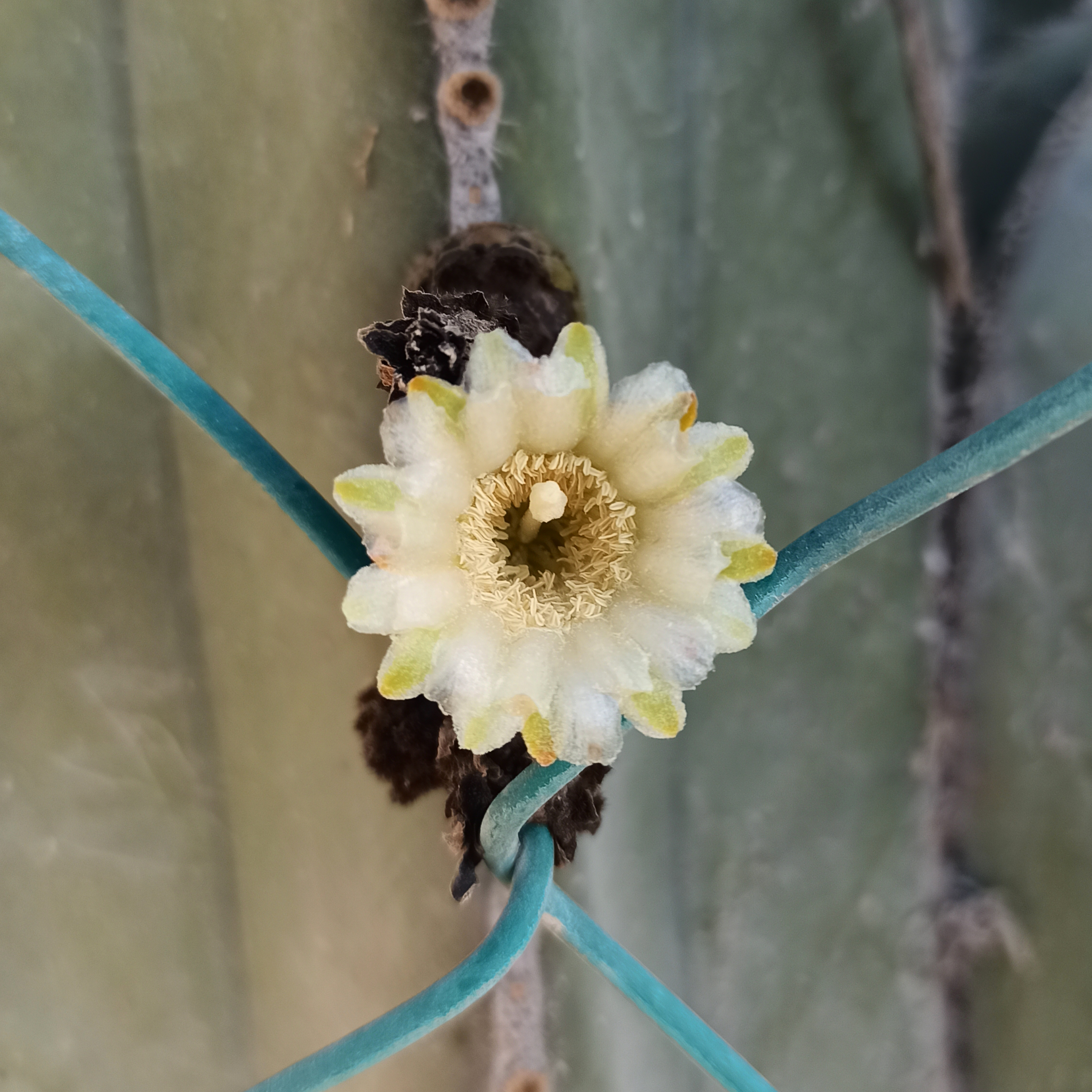
Flower

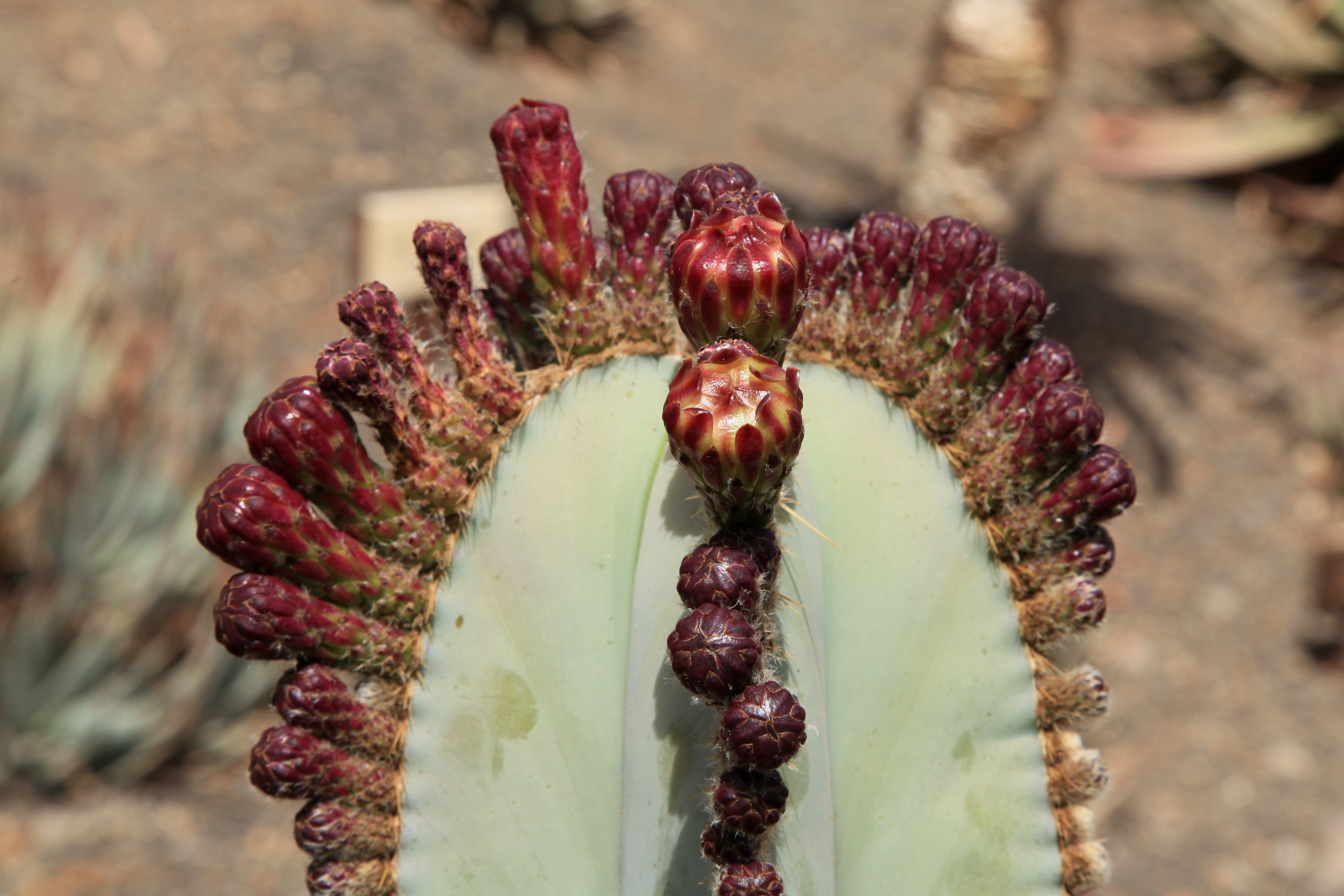
Buds

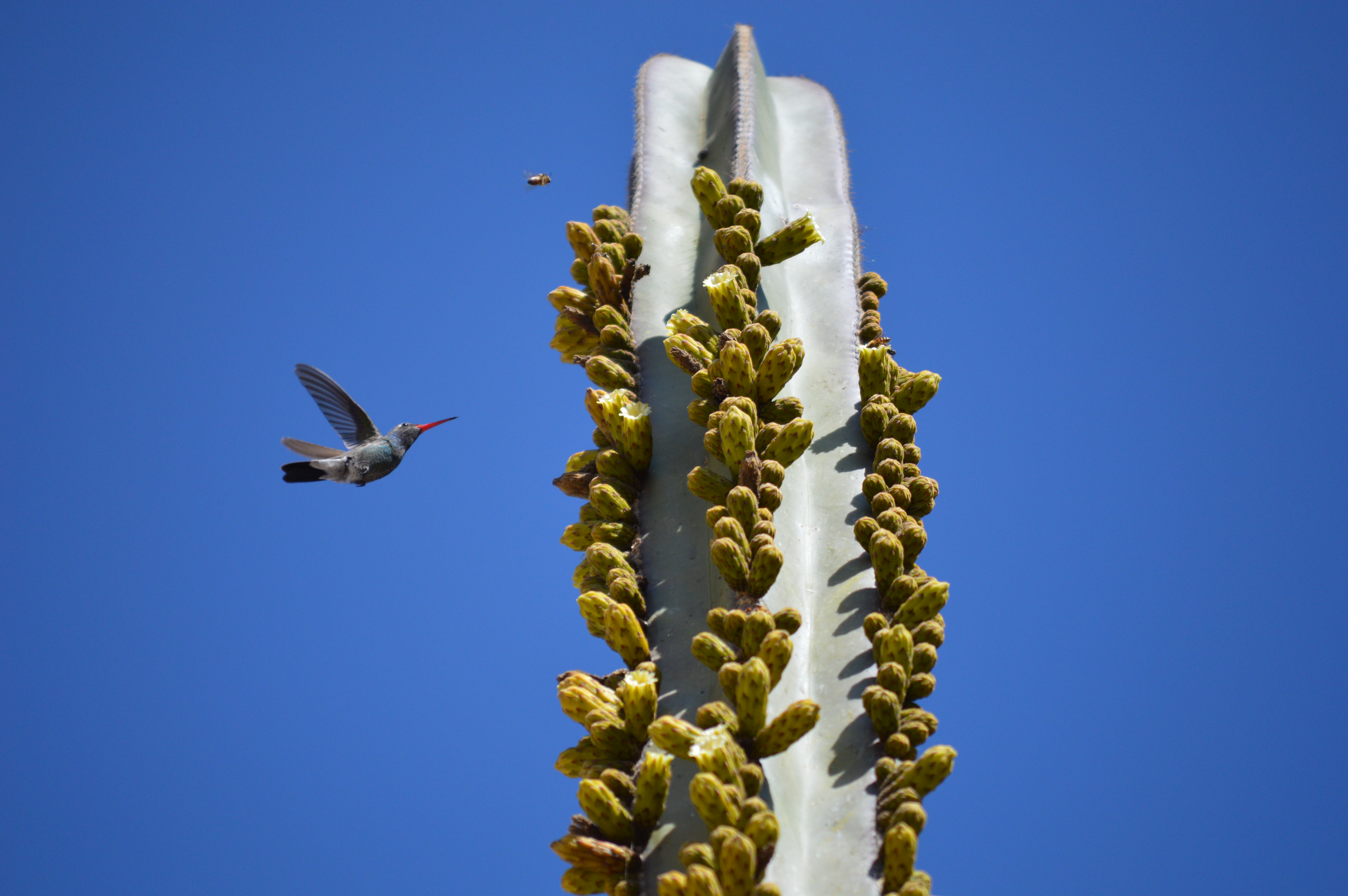
Fruits

== Distribution ==
The species is native to Mexico states of Hidalgo, México, Guanajuato, Querétaro, Morelos, Puebla, Oaxaca, Colima, Michoacán, and Guerrero. It is also found in U.S. states that border Mexico: Texas, New Mexico, Arizona, and Southern California.

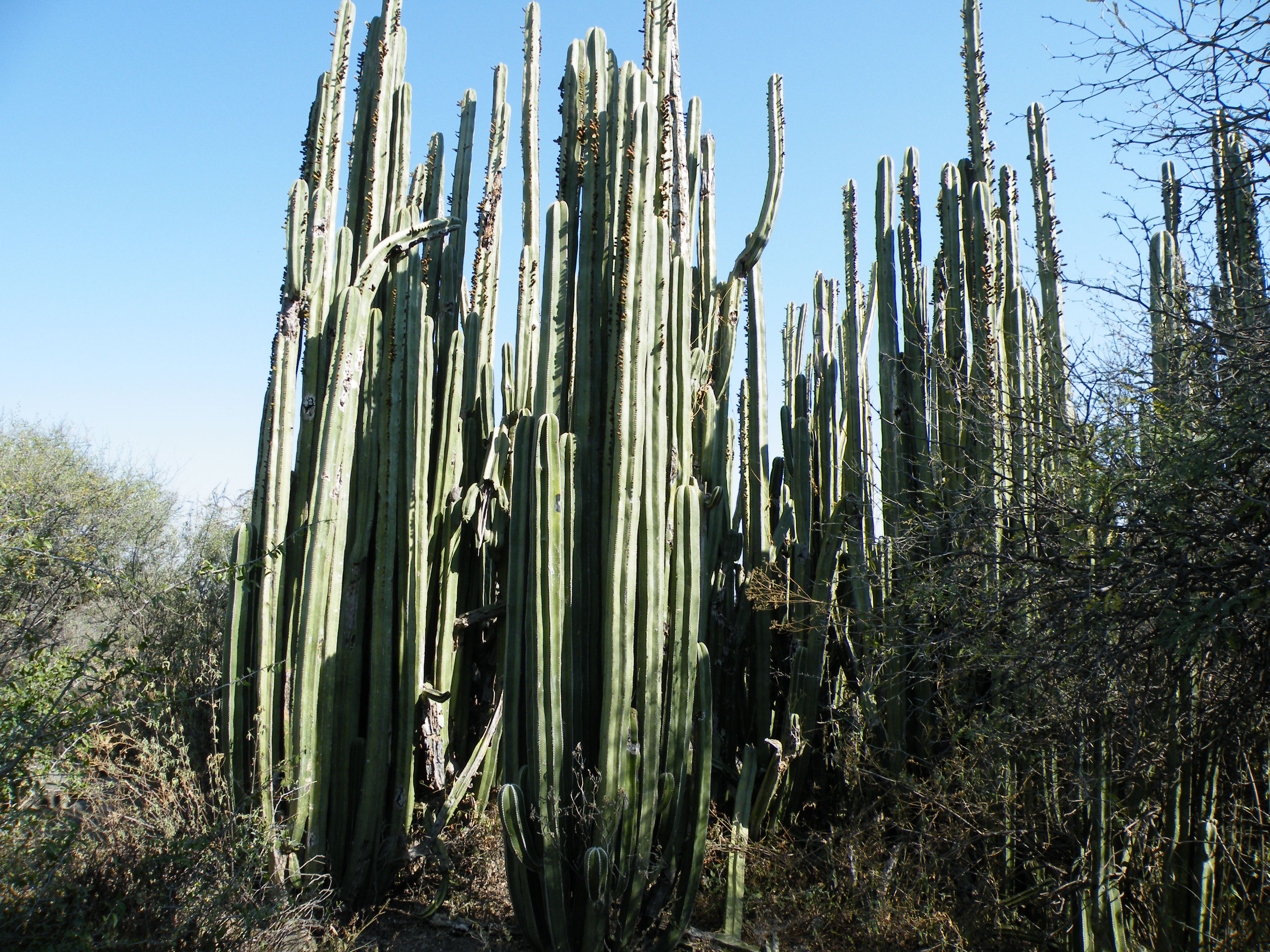
Tequisquiapan, Querétaro

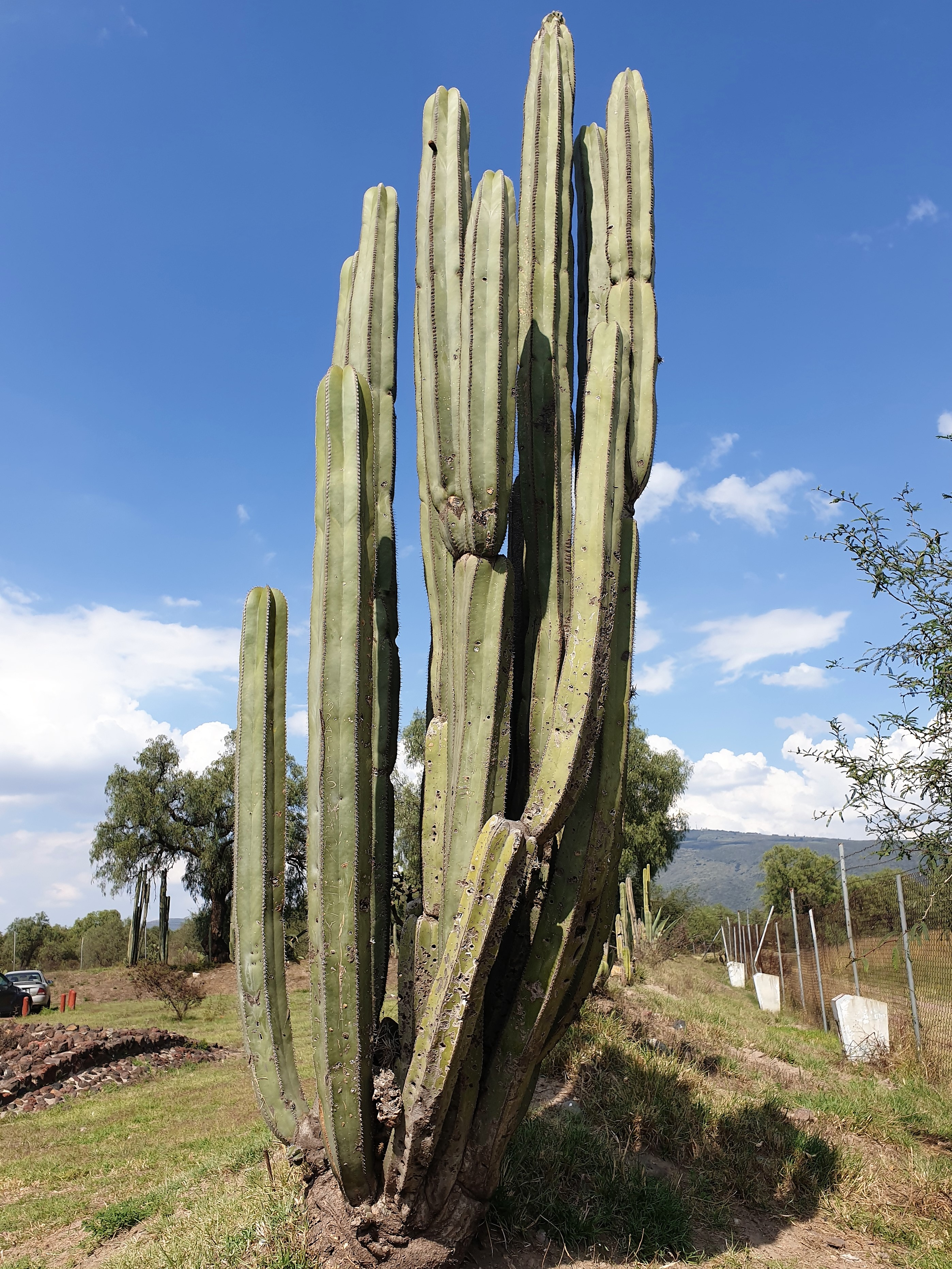
Teotihuacan, State of Mexico

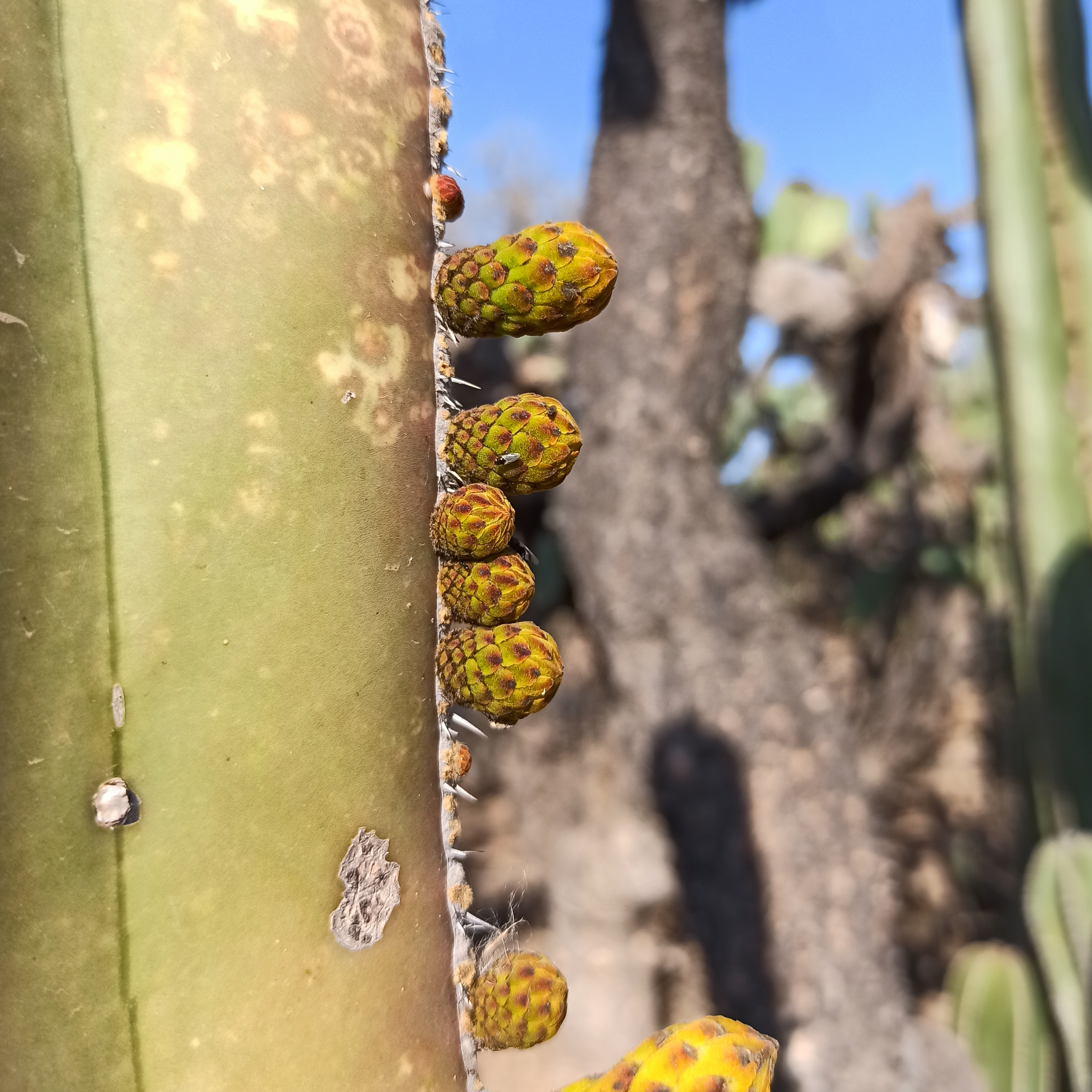
Dolores Hidalgo, Guanajuato

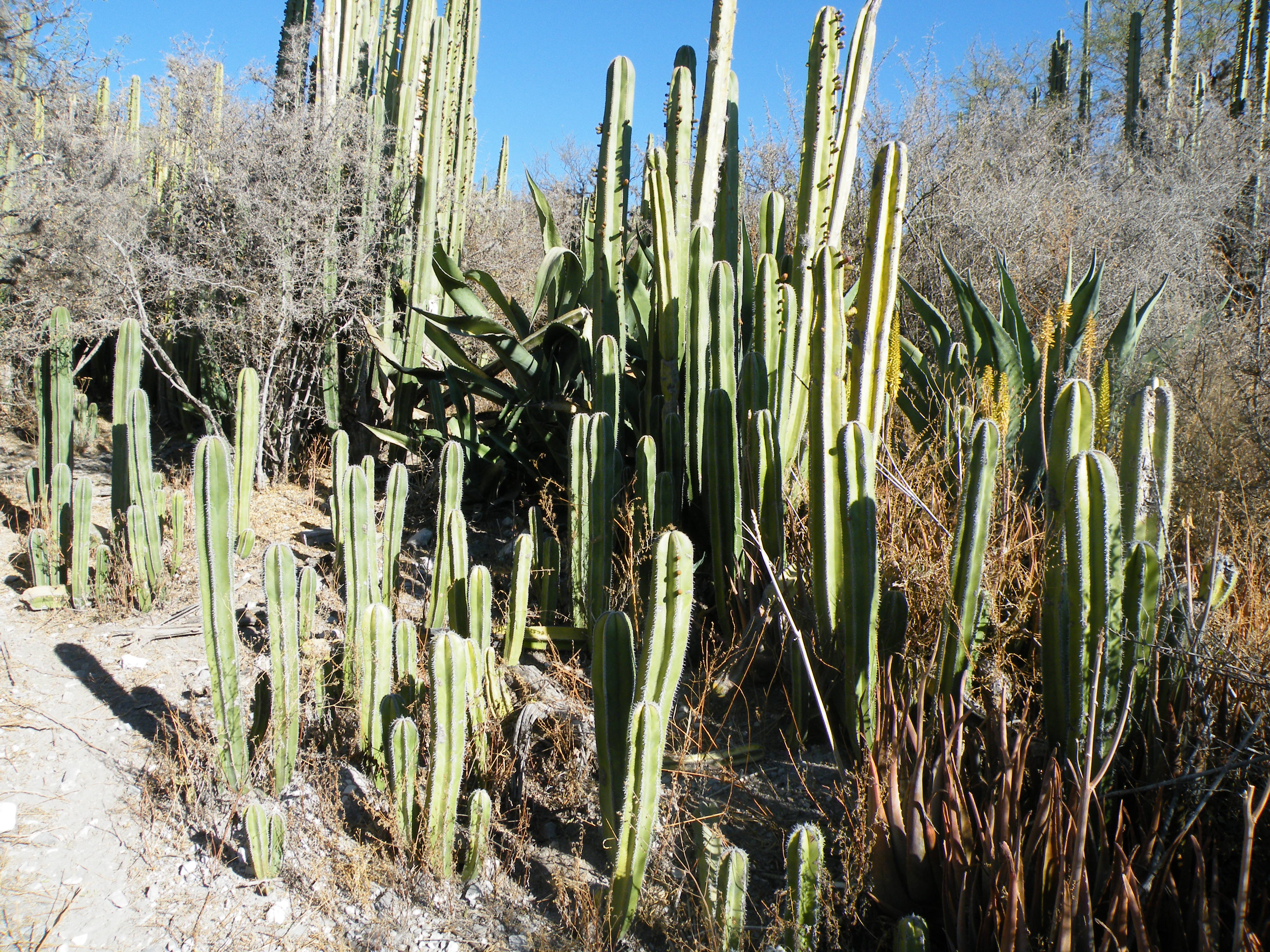
Doctor Arroyo, Nuevo León

== Taxonomy ==
The first description as Cereus marginatus was made in 1828 by Augustin-Pyrame de Candolle. The specific epithet marginatus comes from Latin, means 'bordered' and refers to the 'edges' formed by the areoles that flow together on the ribs. Salvador Arias and Teresa Terrazas placed the species in the genus Lophocereus in 2009.
