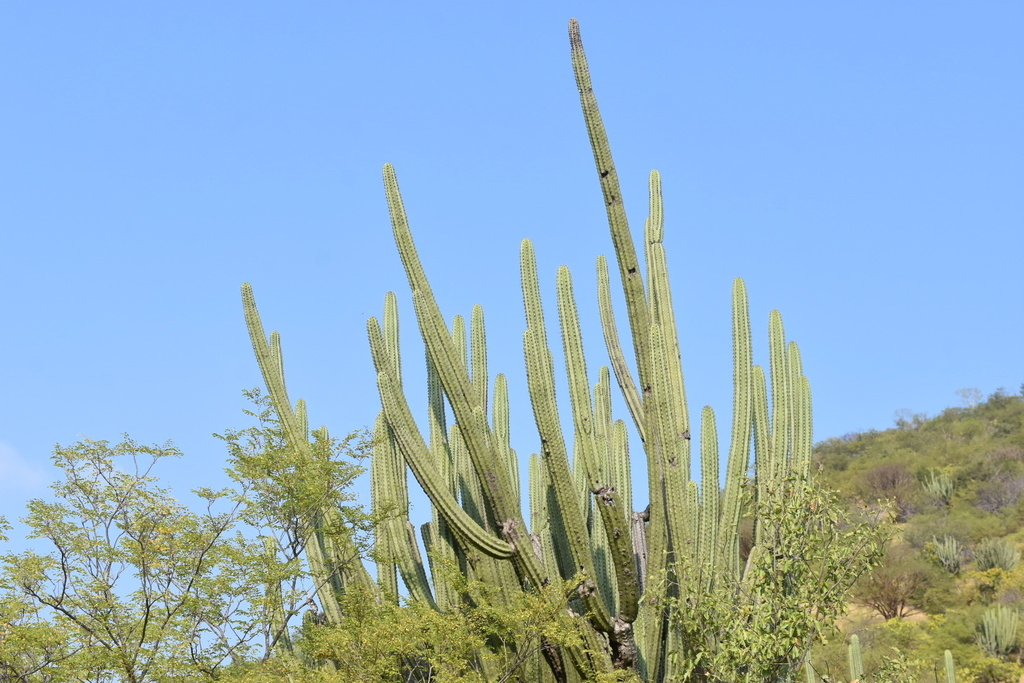

Conservation status
- Least Concern (IUCN 3.1)

Scientific classification
- Kingdom: Plantae
- Clade: Tracheophytes
- Clade: Angiosperms
- Clade: Eudicots
- Order: Caryophyllales
- Family: Cactaceae
- Subfamily: Cactoideae
- Genus: Stenocereus
- Species: S. quevedonis

Binomial name
- Stenocereus quevedonis (J.G.Ortega) Buxb. 1961

Synonyms
- Glandulicereus quevedonis (J.G.Ortega) Guiggi 2012; Lemaireocereus quevedonis J.G.Ortega 1928; Rathbunia quevedonis (J.G.Ortega) P.V.Heath 1992

= Stenocereus quevedonis =

Species of cactus

Stenocereus quevedonis is a species of cactus in the genus Stenocereus, endemic to Mexico.

== Description ==
Stenocereus quevedonis is a tree-like cactus that usually grows straight branches and can reach a height of 6 meters. It develops a distinct trunk and its dark green shoots are 1 to 4 meters long, with a diameter of 10 to 15 centimeters. The cactus has seven to nine broad, blunt ribs that are clipped and can grow up to 1.5 centimeters in height. Stems have dark round areoles with spines. Its central spines, numbered from three to seven, emerge or bend downward and are 1.5 to 3 centimeters long, the longest spine in the center reaches 5.5 centimeters. The radial spines, which initially appear white, turn gray over time and are usually 1 to 1.5 centimeters long.

The cactus produces long, funnel-shaped flowers that are white or yellow with a slight pink tinge. These flowers bloom at night and remain open until the next day, measuring up to 9 centimeters long and 3.6 to 5 centimeters in diameter. The flower tube has a slight bulge where the nectar chamber is. After flowering, Stenocereus quevedonis produces round to slightly elongated, green to slightly reddish fruits that can reach 5 to 6 centimeters in diameter. Fruits have red, yellow, white, or purple pulp. Seeds are 1.8–2 mm long and black.

== Distribution ==
Stenocereus quevedonis is commonly found in deciduous forests and scrubland of Michoacán and Guerrero, Mexico, in the Balsas River Basin, at altitudes between 100 and 500 meters. Plants grow along with Ceiba aesculifolia, Parkinsonia praecox, Lophocereus marginatus, Stenocereus chrysocarpus, Stenocereus fricii, Stenocereus standleyi, and Mitrocereus militaris. Plants are pollinated by bats, bees, and hummingbirds. Seeds are dispersed by birds.

== Taxonomy ==
The cactus was first described as Lemaireocereus quevedonis in 1928 by Jesus Gonzalez Ortega. The specific name, "quevedonis", pays homage to the Mexican botanist Miguel Ángel de Quevedo. In 1961, Franz Buxbaum reclassified the species in the genus Stenocereus.
