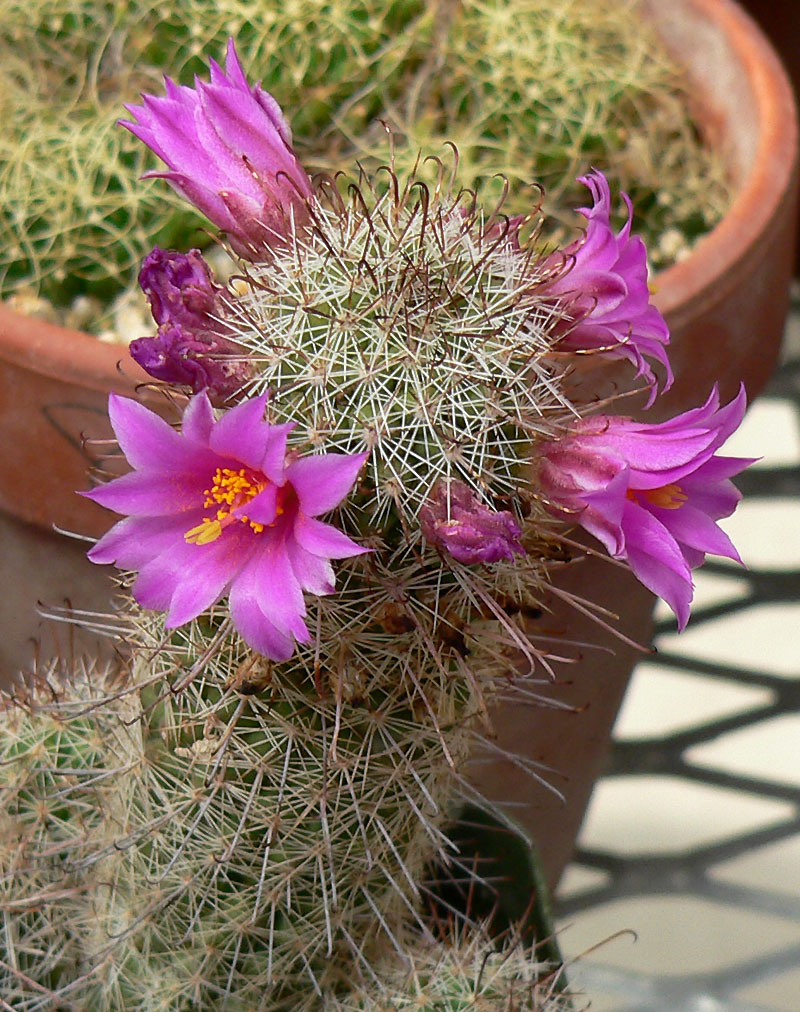

Conservation status
- Least Concern (IUCN 3.1)

Scientific classification
- Kingdom: Plantae
- Clade: Tracheophytes
- Clade: Angiosperms
- Clade: Eudicots
- Order: Caryophyllales
- Family: Cactaceae
- Subfamily: Cactoideae
- Genus: Cochemiea
- Species: C. mazatlanensis

Binomial name
- Cochemiea mazatlanensis (K.Schum.) D.Aquino & Dan.Sánchez 2022

Synonyms
- Chilita mazatlanensis (K.Schum.) Orcutt 1926; Ebnerella mazatlanensis (K.Schum.) Buxb. 1951; Escobariopsis mazatlanensis (K.Schum.) Doweld 2000; Mammillaria mazatlanensis K.Schum. 1901; Neomammillaria mazatlanensis (K.Schum.) Britton & Rose 1923; Chilita occidentalis (Britton & Rose) Orcutt 1926; Ebnerella occidentalis (Britton & Rose) Buxb. 1951; Escobariopsis mazatlanensis subsp. patonii (Bravo) Doweld 2000; Mammillaria littoralis K.Brandegee 1908; Mammillaria mazatlanensis var. monocentra R.T.Craig 1945; Mammillaria mazatlanensis var. occidentalis (Britton & Rose) Neutel. 1986; Mammillaria mazatlanensis subsp. patonii (Bravo) D.R.Hunt 1998; Mammillaria mazatlanensis f. patonii (Bravo) Neutel. 1986; Mammillaria mazatlanensis f. sinalensis (R.T.Craig) Neutel. 1986; Mammillaria occidentalis (Britton & Rose) Boed. 1933; Mammillaria occidentalis var. patonii (Bravo) R.T.Craig 1945; Mammillaria occidentalis var. sinalensis R.T.Craig 1945; Mammillaria patonii (Bravo) Werderm. 1931; Mammillaria patonii var. sinalensis (R.T.Craig) Backeb. 1961; Neomammillaria occidentalis Britton & Rose 1923; Neomammillaria patonii Bravo 1931; Neomammillaria sinaloensis Rose 1929

= Cochemiea mazatlanensis =

Species of cactus

Cochemiea mazatlanensis is a species of Cochemiea found in Mexico.

== Description ==
This species is characterized by its short, columnar, grayish-green stems that branch from the base, creating larger, clump-forming structures. Individual stems typically measure between 4 and 15 cm (5.9 in) in length and 2 to 5 cm (0.79 to 1.97 in) in diameter. The surface of these stems is adorned with conical tubercles, each about 3 to 4 mm (0.12 to 0.16 in) long and arranged in a spiral pattern. Notably, these tubercles do not produce milky sap. The spaces between the tubercles (axils) are generally bare, though they may occasionally bear one or two short bristles. Atop each tubercle sits an areole, with spines. These areoles typically carry 1 to 4 central spines that are reddish-brown, 0.8 to 1.5 cm (0.31 to 0.59 in) long, and sometimes hooked and 12 to 18 radial spines that are white, straight, and 0.5 to 1 cm (0.20 to 0.39 in) long. The cactus produces tubular flowers that are carmine to purplish-pink in color, measuring approximately 3 to 4 cm (1.2 to 1.6 in) long and 3 cm (1.2 in) in diameter. These flowers are self-sterile, meaning they require pollen from another plant to produce fruit. The resulting fruits are reddish-yellow or brown and contain black seeds.

== Distribution ==
The plant is found growing in desert hills, dunes, and dry scrub biomes in the Mexican states of Colima, Jalisco, Michoacan, Nayarit, Sinaloa and southern Sonora between sea level and 500 meters. Plants are found growing along with Stenocereus kerberi , Echinocereus subinermis subsp. ochoterenae, Mammillaria beneckei, Mammillaria bocensis, Pachycereus pecten-aboriginum, Opuntia decumbens, Stenocereus thurberi, Stenocereus alamosensis , Pilosocereus purpusii, Pilosocereus alensis and Acanthocereus tetragonus.

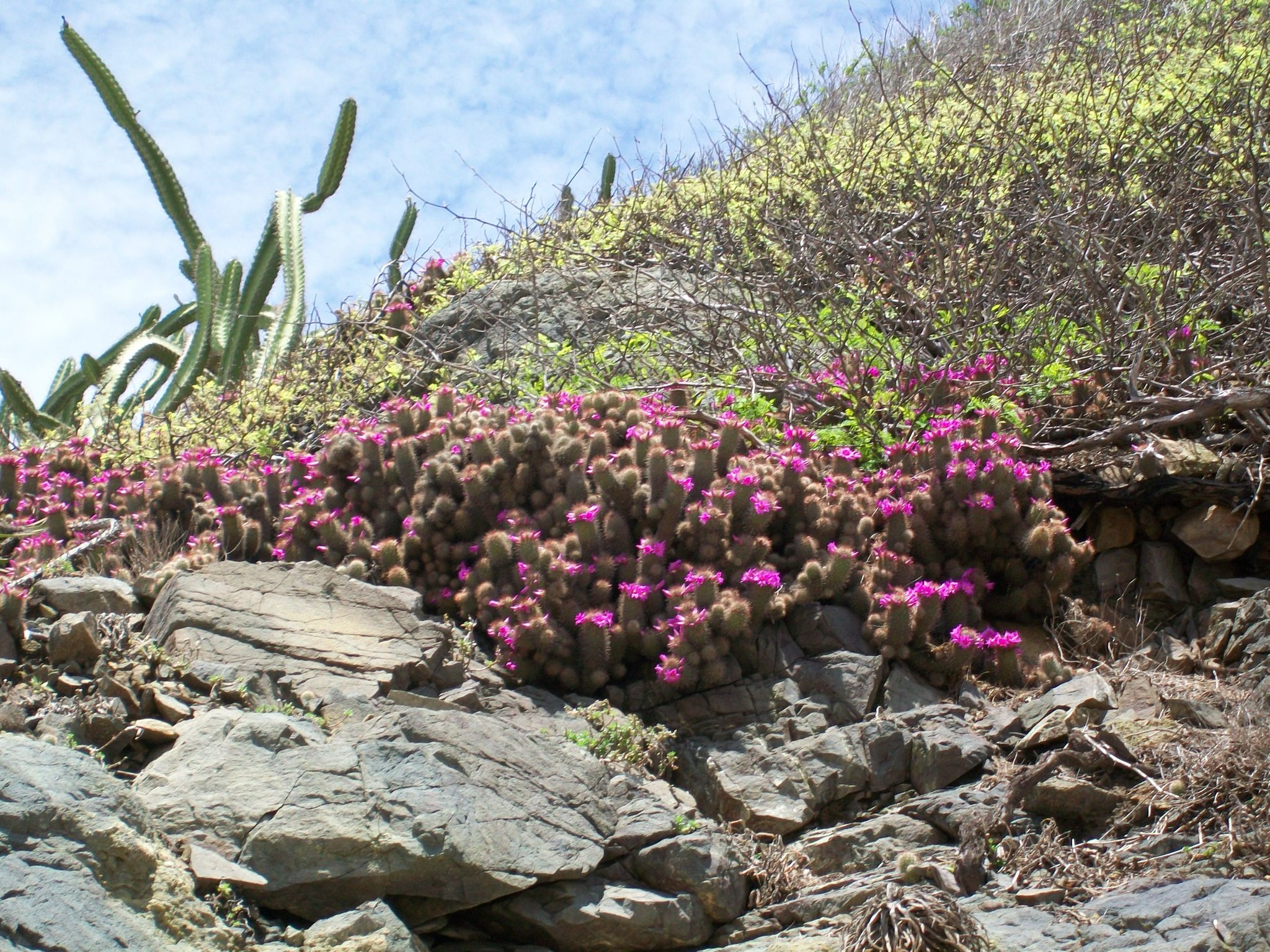
Habitat in Farallón, Jalisco, Mexico

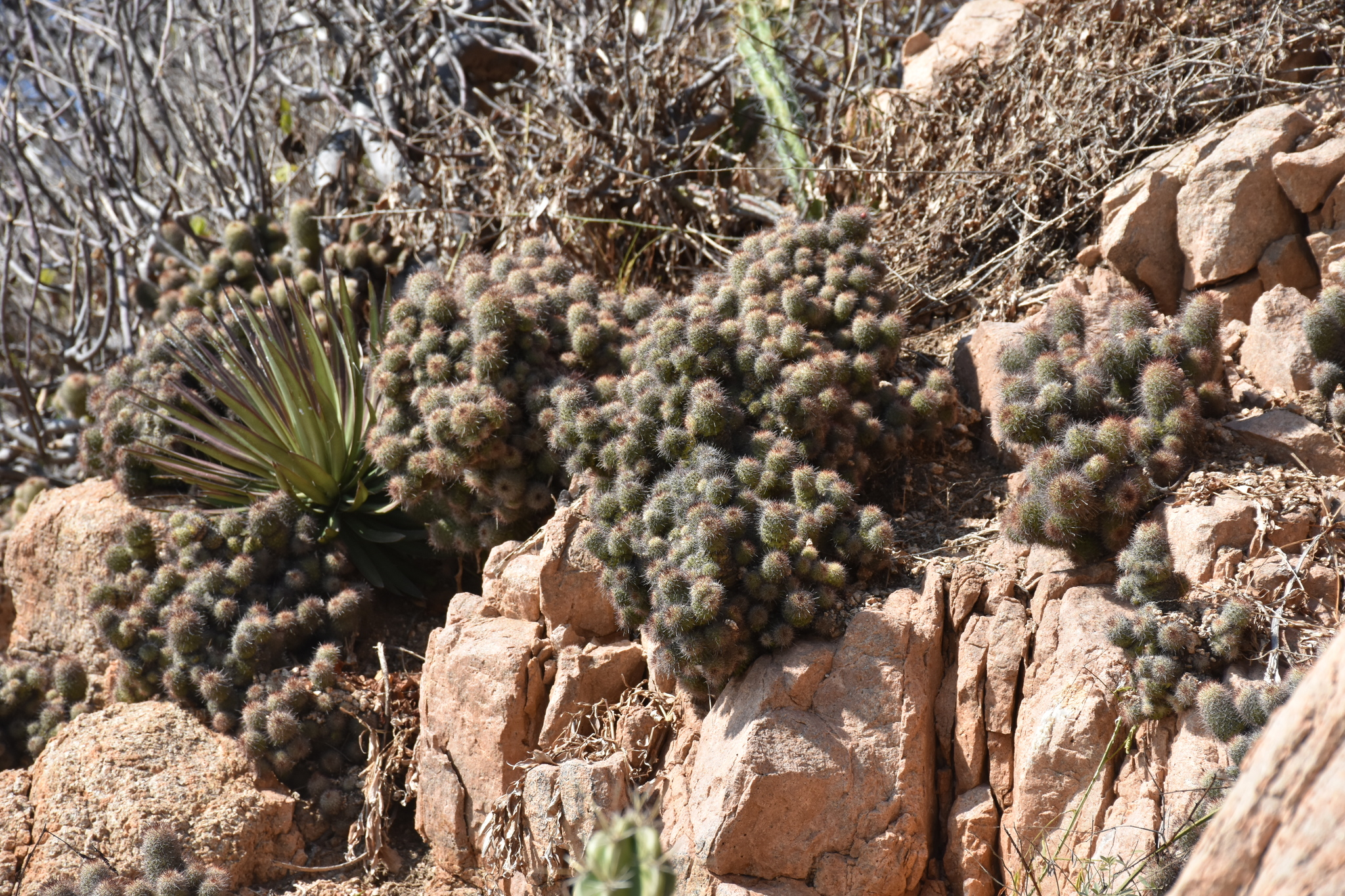
Habitat in San Mateo, Jalisco, Mexico

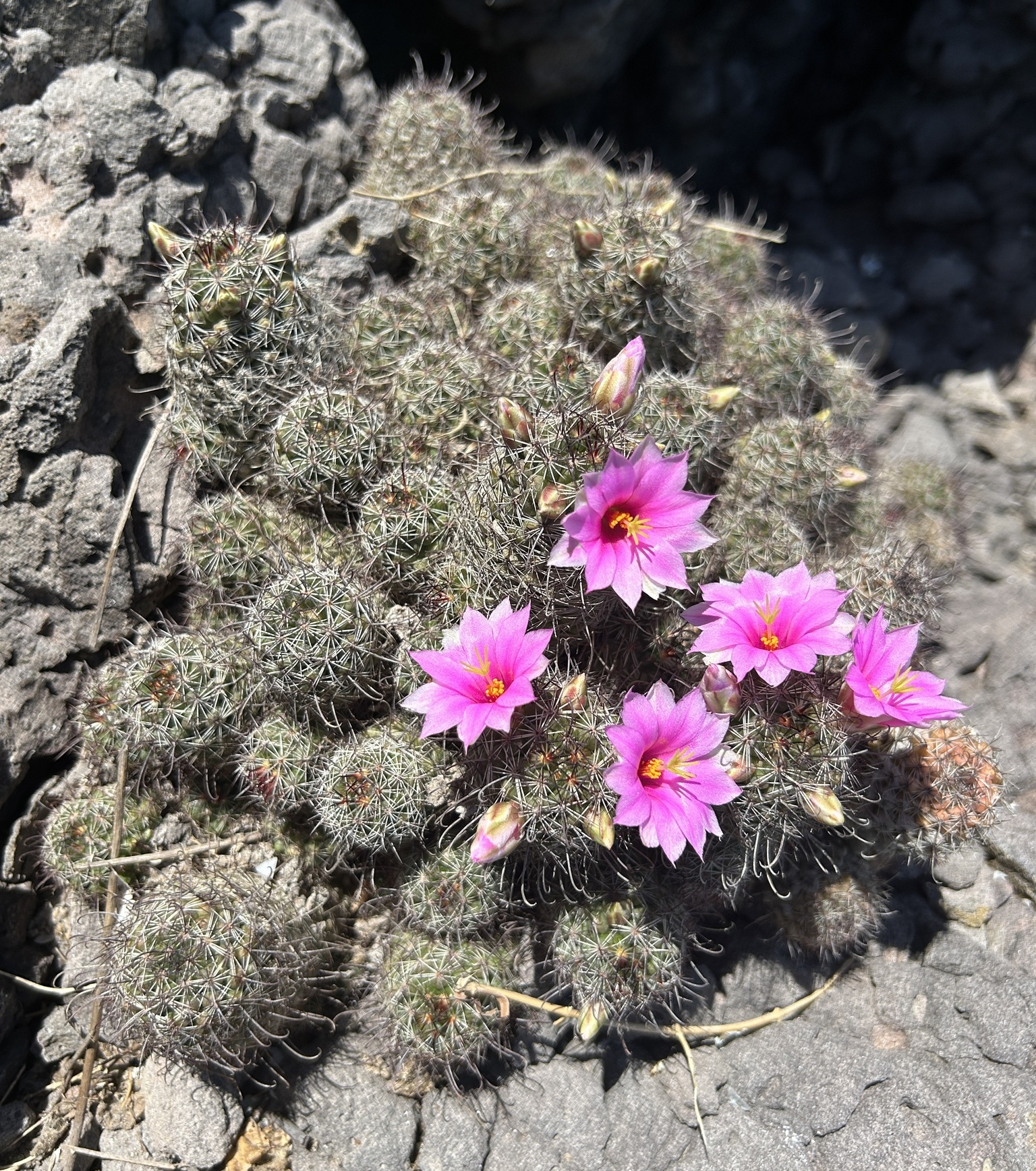
Plant blooming in San Ignacio, Sinaloa

== Taxonomy ==
The plant was originally described as Mammillaria mazatlanensis in 1901 by German botanist Karl Moritz Schumann, who named it after Mazatlan, Sinaloa where the plant first collected. In 2022, botanists David Aquino and Daniel Sánchez reclassified the species into the genus Cochemiea, establishing its current scientific name, Cochemiea mazatlanensis.
