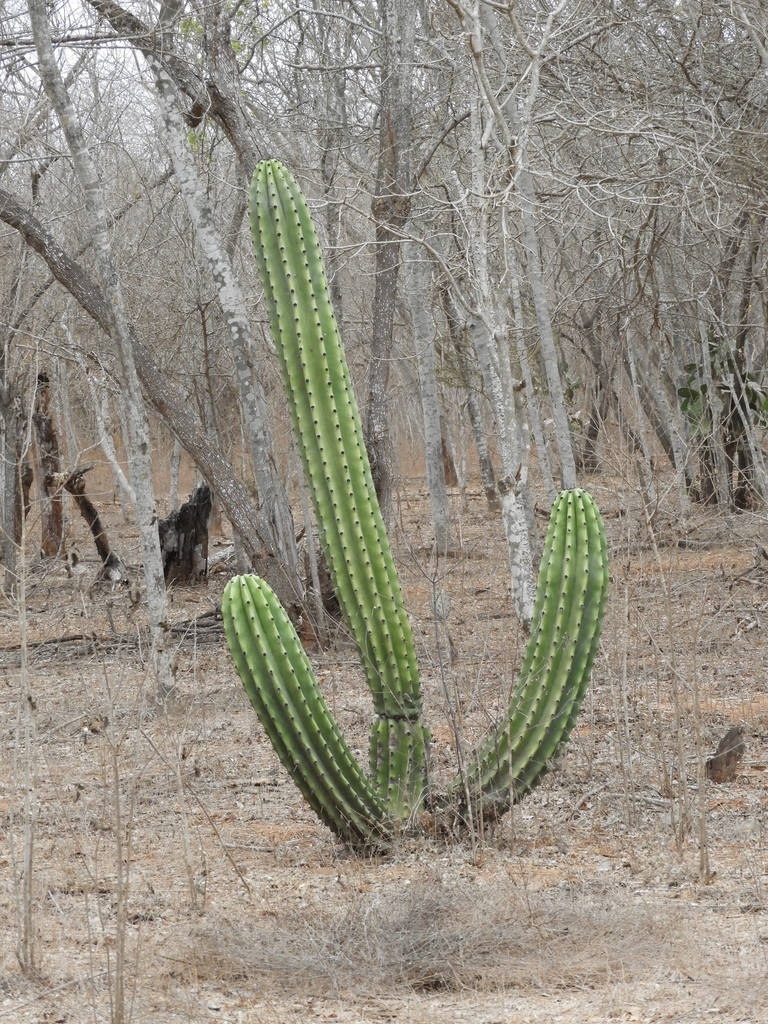

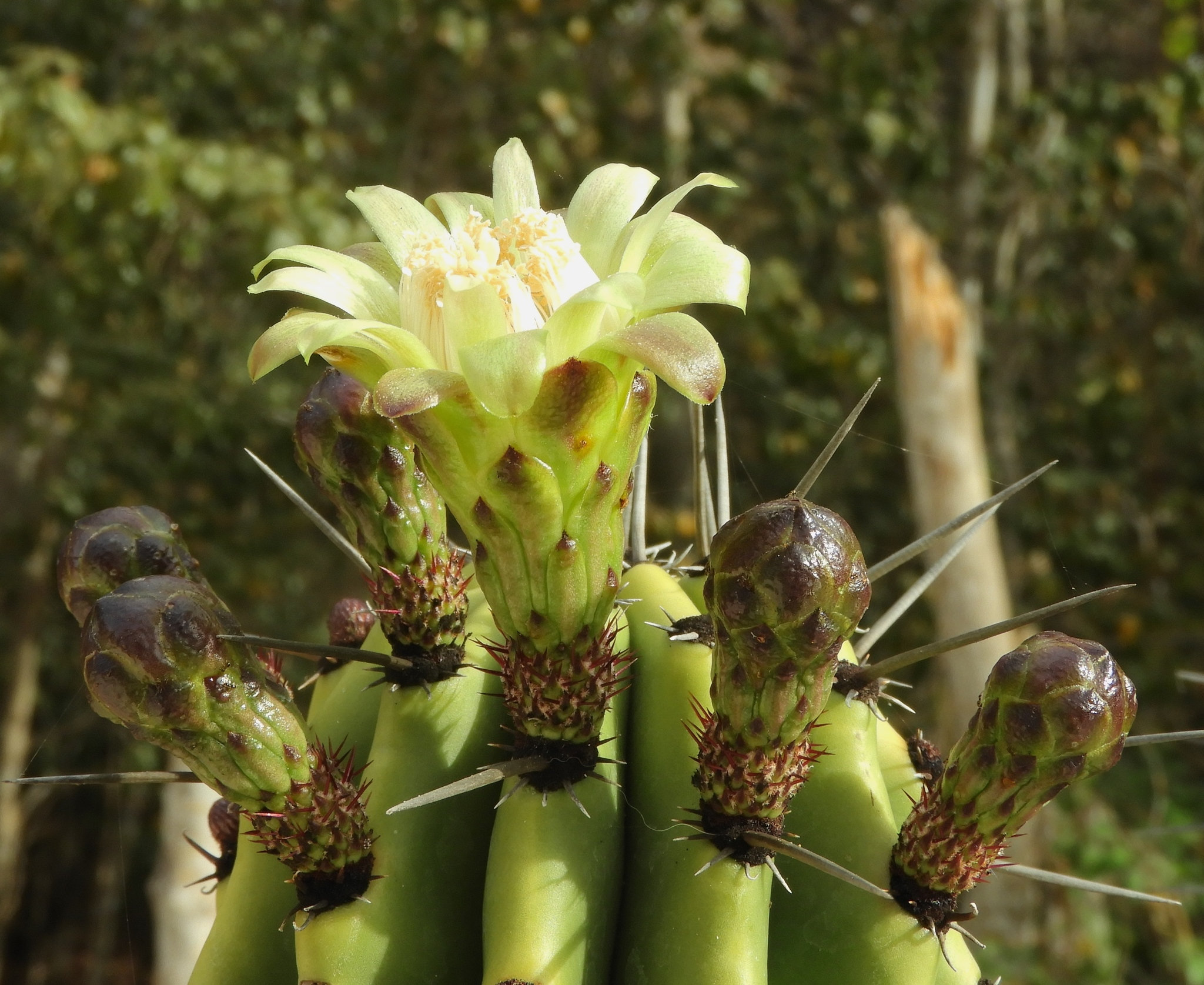

Conservation status
- Endangered (IUCN 3.1)

Scientific classification
- Kingdom: Plantae
- Clade: Tracheophytes
- Clade: Angiosperms
- Clade: Eudicots
- Order: Caryophyllales
- Family: Cactaceae
- Subfamily: Cactoideae
- Genus: Stenocereus
- Species: S. martinezii

Binomial name
- Stenocereus martinezii (J.G.Ortega) Buxb.

Synonyms
- Glandulicereus martinezii (J.G.Ortega) Guiggi; Lemaireocereus martinezii J.G.Ortega; Rathbunia martinezii (J.G.Ortega) P.V.Heath

= Stenocereus martinezii =

Species of plant

Stenocereus martinezii is a species of flowering plant in the family Cactaceae, native to Sinaloa in Mexico. A candelabriform cactus typically 5 to 7 m (16 to 23 ft) tall, it is easy to propagate from cuttings, so local people use it to build live fences.

== Description ==
Stenocereus martinezii is an arborescent cactus that can grow between 5 and 7 meters tall. It tends to develop a trunk that reaches up to 1 meter in height and can have a diameter of up to 25 centimeters. The shoots are mostly cylindrical, measuring 8 to 20 centimeters in diameter, and feature ten to twelve ribs adorned with prominent dark reddish-brown areoles. Typically, there is one central spine, which can sometimes be two or three, that grows horizontally or slightly sideways and measures 2 to 5 centimeters long. Additionally, the cactus has four to nine radial spines, although up to eleven can occur; these are grayish and range from 2 to 6 millimeters in length, occasionally reaching up to 12 millimeters. The flowers of Stenocereus martinezii are funnel-shaped and have whitish to yellowish hues. They bloom at night and remain open into the following day, measuring 5 to 7 centimeters long with diameters of 3.1 to 6.6 centimeters. The cactus produces spherical to egg-shaped green fruits, which measure 3 to 4.5 centimeters in diameter and turn red as they ripen, with red flesh inside.

== Distribution ==
This species is found growing in the dry deciduous forests and valleys of the Mexican state of Sinaloa, typically at elevations around 100 meters. Plants are found growing along with Ceiba aesculifolia, Parkinsonia praecox, Pachycereus pecten-aboriginum and Stenocereus alamosensis.

== Taxonomy ==
Originally described as Lemaireocereus martinezii in 1930 by Jesús González Ortega, the species was reclassified into the Stenocereus genus by Franz Buxbaum in 1961. The specific epithet "martinezii" is in honor of Mexican botanist Maximiliano Martinez (1888–1964), who was a key figure in establishing the Botanical Society of Mexico. In Spanish, it is commonly known as pitahayo or pitayo.
