= Stenocereus fricii =

Conservation status
- Least Concern (IUCN 3.1)

Scientific classification
- Kingdom: Plantae
- Clade: Tracheophytes
- Clade: Angiosperms
- Clade: Eudicots
- Order: Caryophyllales
- Family: Cactaceae
- Subfamily: Cactoideae
- Genus: Stenocereus
- Species: S. fricii

Binomial name
- Stenocereus fricii Sánchez-Mej. 1973

Synonyms
- Griseocactus fricii (Sánchez-Mej.) Guiggi 2012; Griseocereus fricii (Sánchez-Mej.) Guiggi 2012; Neogriseocereus fricii (Sánchez-Mej.) Guiggi 2013; Rathbunia fricii (Sánchez-Mej.) P.V.Heath 1992

Species of cactus

Stenocereus fricii is a species of cactus in the genus Stenocereus, endemic to Mexico.

== Description ==
Stenocereus fricii has a distinctive tree-like shape, characterized by multiple shoots that predominantly branch out from the base, resembling a candelabra. It typically grows to heights between 4 and 7 meters, with a trunk that is hardly noticeable. The shoots can vary in color from light green to yellowish or grayish hues, measuring between 2 and 7 meters in length and 8 to 12 centimeters in diameter. Each shoot features four to six broad, slightly wavy ribs that are 2.5 to 3 centimeters tall. The plant has seven to twelve central spines that are grayish-white and measure 2 to 5 centimeters long, with four of them being longer and more robust than the others. Additionally, there are twelve to fourteen radial spines that radiate outward, also grayish-white, ranging from 6 to 12 millimeters in length.

The flowers of Stenocereus fricii are funnel- to bell-shaped, opening during the day. They range from 10 to 12 centimeters long and are typically white with hints of cream or pink. The spherical fruits are either red or yellow and can reach a diameter of 5 centimeters. Each fruit is adorned with about 25 spines per areole, which drop off upon ripening, revealing orange to red flesh inside.

== Distribution ==
This cactus species is commonly found in the lower Balsas Region in the Mexican states of Colima, Guerrero, Jalisco, Michoacán, and Sinaloa, primarily in deciduous forests at elevations between 5 and 500 meters. Plants are found growing along with Mitrocereus militaris, Pachycereus tepamo, Stenocereus chrysocarpus, and Stenocereus standleyi.

== Taxonomy ==
Stenocereus fricii was first described in 1973 by Hernándo Sánchez-Mejorada. The specific name, "fricii", honors the Czech gardener Alberto Vojtěch Frič, who collected cacti in America. A Spanish common name for this species is "pitayo de aguas".
