= Stenocereus chrysocarpus =

Conservation status
- Endangered (IUCN 3.1)

Scientific classification
- Kingdom: Plantae
- Clade: Tracheophytes
- Clade: Angiosperms
- Clade: Eudicots
- Order: Caryophyllales
- Family: Cactaceae
- Subfamily: Cactoideae
- Genus: Stenocereus
- Species: S. chrysocarpus

Binomial name
- Stenocereus chrysocarpus Sánchez-Mej. 1972

Synonyms
- Glandulicereus chrysocarpus (Sánchez-Mej.) Guiggi 2012; Rathbunia chrysocarpa (Sánchez-Mej.) P.V.Heath 1992

Species of cactus

Stenocereus chrysocarpus is a species of cactus in the genus Stenocereus, endemic to Mexico.

== Description ==
Stenocereus chrysocarpus is a tree-like cactus that can grow to heights of 5 to 9 meters. It has a distinct trunk and features numerous candelabra-like branches. The upright, green shoots measure between 2 and 5 meters in length and are spaced apart, with a diameter of 10 to 14 centimeters. Each shoot has seven, and sometimes eight, slightly curved ribs that rise to 3.5 to 4 centimeters in height. The areoles on these ribs are covered with reddish to blackish, felty hairs. There may be up to two grayish central spines, which can be absent, and these spines are bent and typically shorter than the surrounding radial spines. Generally, there are seven stiff, protruding whitish radial spines that are 11 to 15 millimeters long.

The cactus produces broad, funnel-shaped, fragrant white flowers that bloom at night and remain open until the following day and are self incompatible. These flowers can grow up to 10 centimeters long and have a diameter of 8 centimeters. The fruits are ellipsoid, reddish-purple, measuring 6 centimeters in length and 4 centimeters in diameter. They are covered with up to 70 yellow, bristle-like thorns that can be up to 2 centimeters long; these thorns fall off when the fruit ripens. The inner flesh of the fruit is scarlet to magenta.

== Distribution ==
Stenocereus chrysocarpus is commonly found in the Mexican states of Michoacán and Guerrero, particularly in the Río Balsas watershed, growing in dry forest, slopes and valleys located at altitudes of 500 to 700 meters. Plants are found growing along with Ceiba aesculifolia, Parkinsonia praecox, Lophocereus marginatus, Stenocereus fricii, Stenocereus standleyi, Mitrocereus militaris, and Pachycereus tepamo. Flowers are pollinated by bats such as Leptonycteris yerbabuenae, Leptonycteris nivalis, Glossophaga, and Sphingidae moths. In the morning flowers are pollinated by bees.

== Taxonomy ==
This species was first described in 1972 by Hernándo Sánchez-Mejorada. The name "chrysocarpus" comes from the Greek words "chrysos", meaning "gold", and "karpos", meaning "fruit", referring to the yellow thorns that adorn the ripening fruits.
