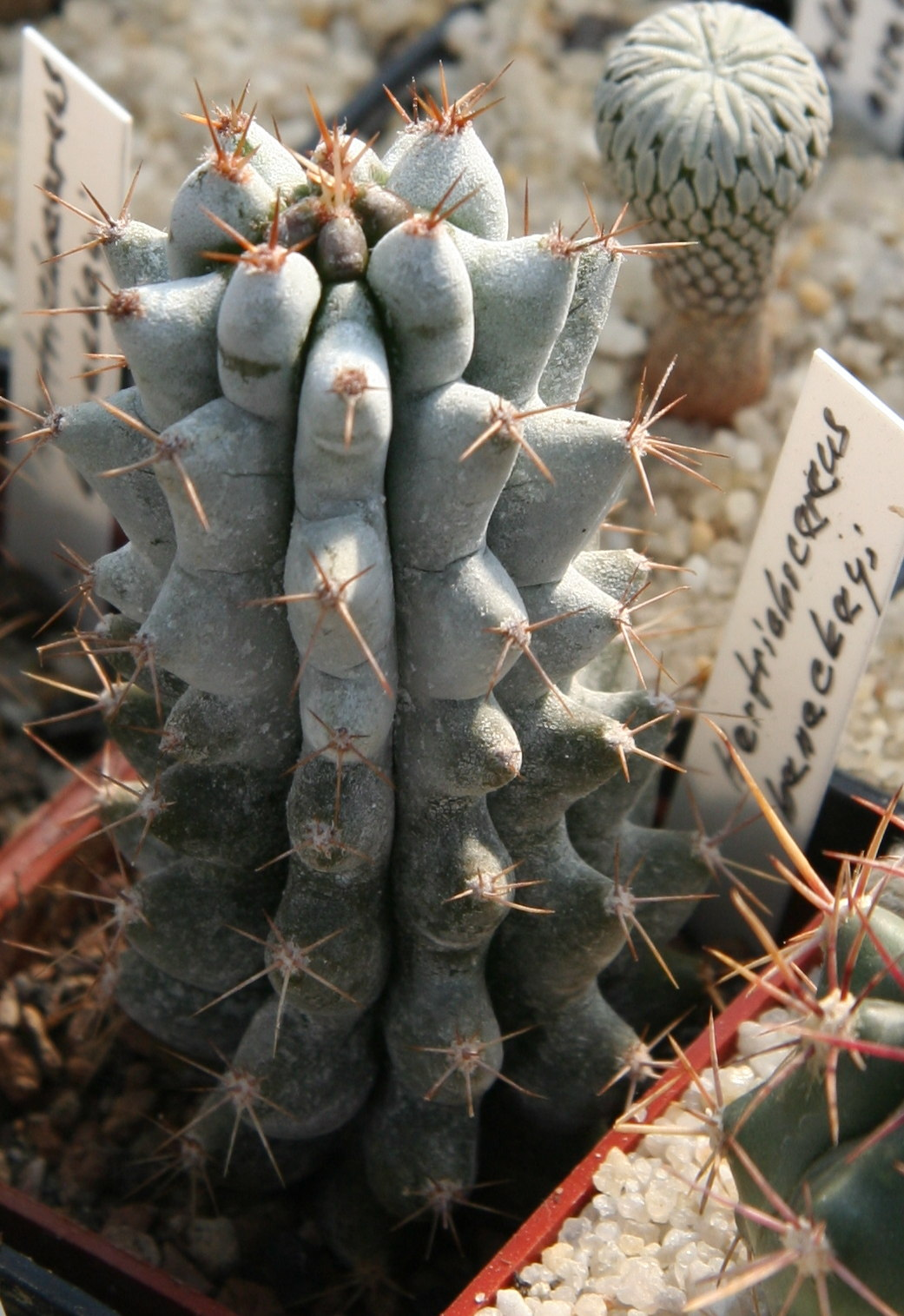

Conservation status
- Near Threatened (IUCN 3.1)

Scientific classification
- Kingdom: Plantae
- Clade: Tracheophytes
- Clade: Angiosperms
- Clade: Eudicots
- Order: Caryophyllales
- Family: Cactaceae
- Subfamily: Cactoideae
- Genus: Stenocereus
- Species: S. beneckei

Binomial name
- Stenocereus beneckei (C.Ehrenb.) Buxb. 1961

Synonyms
- Cereus beneckei C.Ehrenb. 1844; Hertrichocereus beneckei (C.Ehrenb.) Backeb. 1951; Lemaireocereus beneckei (C.Ehrenb.) Britton & Rose 1923; Piptanthocereus beneckei (C.Ehrenb.) Riccob. 1909; Rathbunia beneckei (C.Ehrenb.) P.V.Heath 1992; Cereus beneckei var. farinosus (Haage ex Salm-Dyck) Salm-Dyck 1950; Cereus farinosus Haage ex Salm-Dyck 1845; Echinocactus farinosus (Haage ex Salm-Dyck) C.F.Först. 1846; Rathbunia beneckei f. cristatus P.V.Heath 1992; Stenocereus beneckei f. cristatus (P.V.Heath) P.V.Heath 1996

= Stenocereus beneckei =

Species of cactus

Stenocereus beneckei is a species of cactus in the genus Stenocereus, endemic to Mexico.

== Description ==
Stenocereus beneckei is a shrub-like cactus with upright or slightly curved shoots, growing 1–2 meters tall. The light to gray-green shoots often appear whitish, with a diameter of 5–7 cm. They feature 6–9 widely spaced ribs divided into large, blunt cusps. The plant has a single stiff, blackish central spine up to 4 cm long, and 2–5 grayish marginal spines up to 1.7 cm long.

Flowers bloom near the shoot tips, opening at night and remaining open into the next day. They are brownish on the outside, white on the inside, and measure 6.5–8 cm long. The ellipsoid fruits are tuberous, initially green, turning red as they mature, and measure up to 5 cm long and 3 cm in diameter, with colorless flesh.

== Distribution ==
This species is native to deciduous forests in the Mexican states of Guerrero, Morelos, Puebla, and México, growing on rocky cliffs at altitudes of 1200 to 1400 meters.

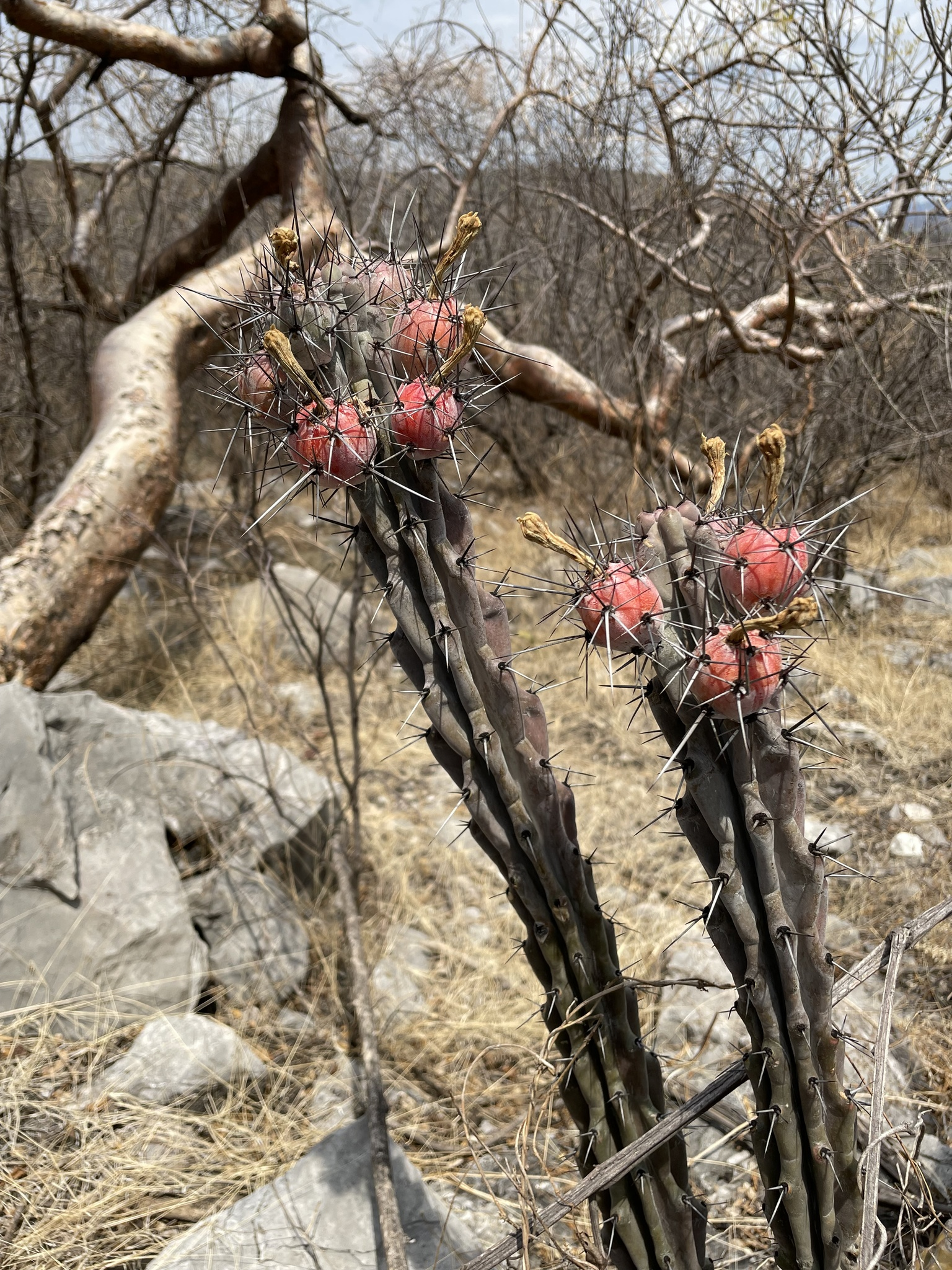
Plant fruiting in habitat in Temilpa Nuevo, Morelos, Mexico

== Taxonomy ==
First described as Cereus beneckei in 1844 by Carl August Ehrenberg, the species was later reclassified as Stenocereus beneckei by Franz Buxbaum in 1961. The specific epithet honors Stephan Benecke, a Berlin-born trader and German consul in Mexico who founded the Camara Nacional de Comercio in 1875.
