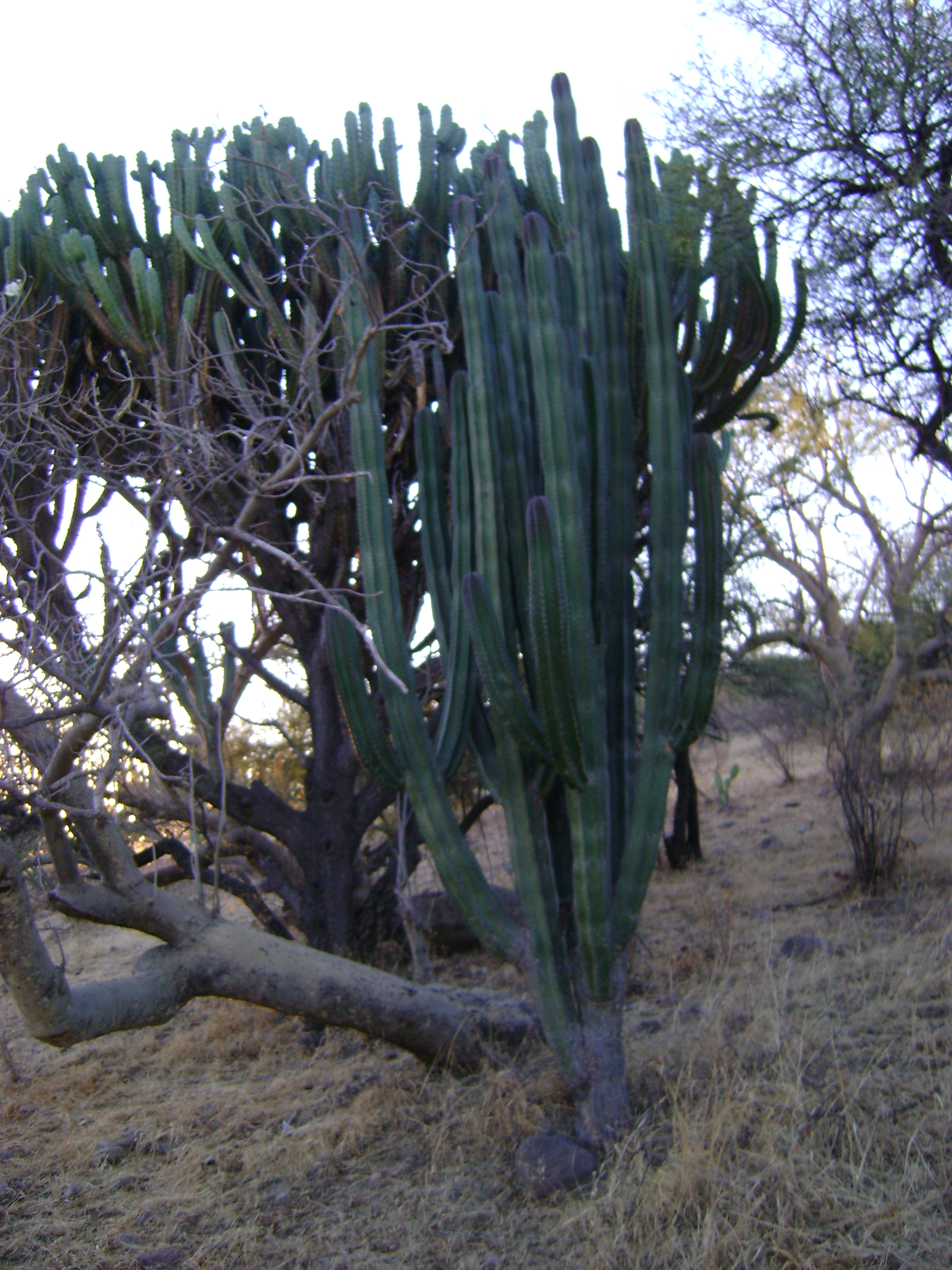
- Stenocereus montanus near Calvillo, Aguascalientes

Conservation status
- Least Concern (IUCN 3.1)

Scientific classification
- Kingdom: Plantae
- Clade: Tracheophytes
- Clade: Angiosperms
- Clade: Eudicots
- Order: Caryophyllales
- Family: Cactaceae
- Subfamily: Cactoideae
- Genus: Stenocereus
- Species: S. montanus

Binomial name
- Stenocereus montanus (Britton & Rose) Buxb.

Synonyms
- Glandulicereus montanus (Britton & Rose) Guiggi; Lemaireocereus montanus Britton & Rose; Rathbunia montana (Britton & Rose) P.V.Heath; Ritterocereus montanus (Britton & Rose) Backeb.

= Stenocereus montanus =

Species of cactus

Stenocereus montanus, known as sahuira, is a species of columnar cactus in the family Cactaceae.

== Description ==
Stenocereus montanus is a tree-like cactus that can grow between 6 and 9 meters tall and features some candelabra-like branches. Its smooth trunk supports shoots that initially spread out but eventually become upright, with diameters ranging from 13 to 20 centimeters. The cactus has seven to nine slightly rounded ribs that are not notched, and noticeable areoles adorned with dark brown, felt-like hairs. Each areole can produce nine to ten thorns, which start off white and gradually turn gray, measuring between 5 and 15 millimeters in length; the longest thorn can reach up to 3 centimeters. The flowers, which bloom at night, are white to pink-white and are pollinated by bats. They measure 6 to 8 centimeters long and have a diameter of 3.5 to 5 centimeters, with distinctly folded back bracts.

The fruits of Stenocereus montanus are spherical to egg-shaped, ranging in color from green to reddish-green or purple, with a diameter of 5 to 6 centimeters. They are covered with fine, light yellow thorns. The internal flesh can be orange, red, or white and is favored by birds and bats for its excellent flavor.

== Distribution ==
This cactus thrives in deciduous forests throughout the Mexican states of Chihuahua, Colima, Jalisco, Nayarit, Sonora and northern Sinaloa typically at altitudes between 200 and 400 meters. Plants are found growing among Fouquieria macdougallii, Jatropha cinerea, Neltuma yaquiana, Lysiloma acapulcense, Ceiba pentandra, Pachycereus pecten-aboriginum and Stenocereus thurberi.

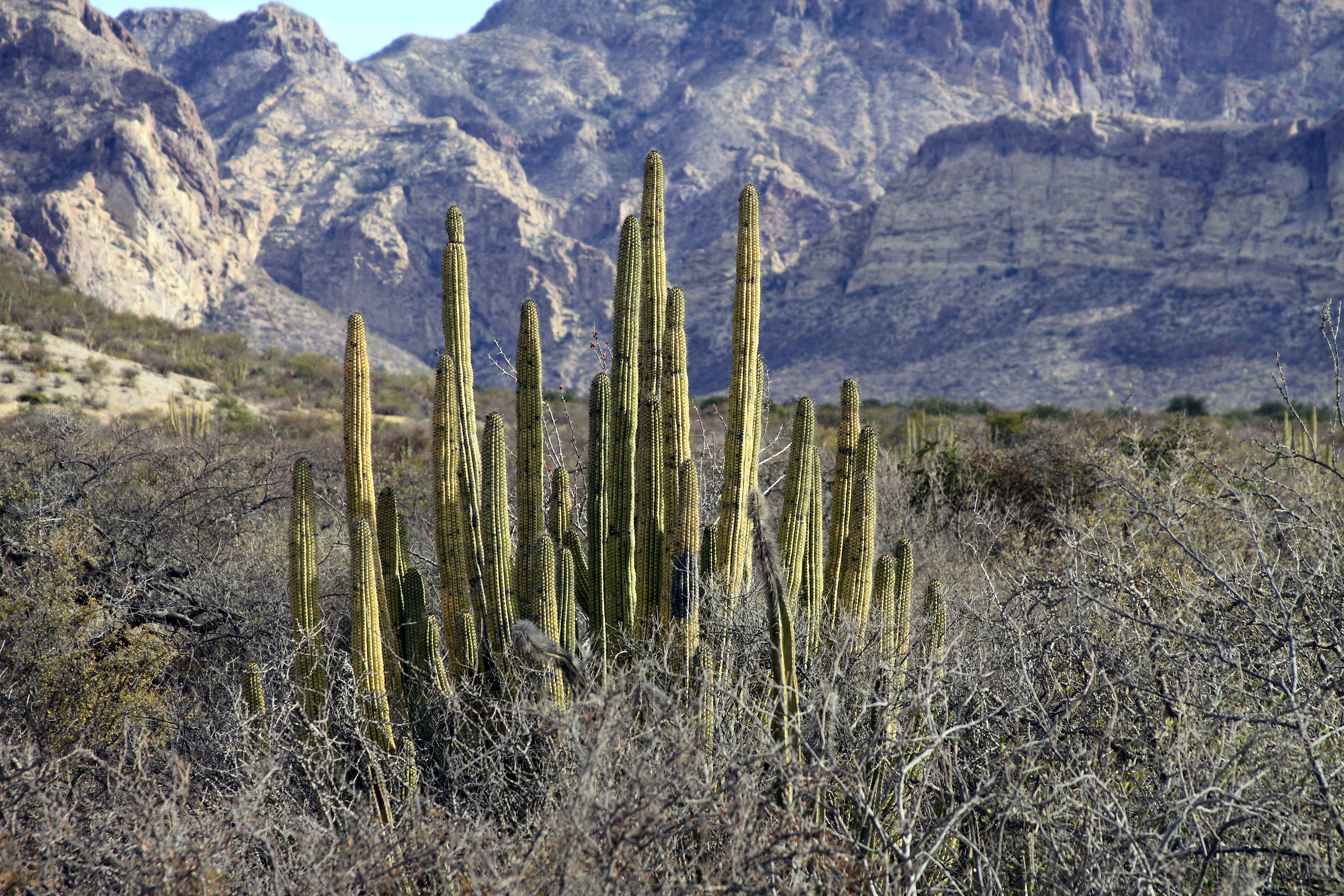
Plant at San Carlos, Sonora, Mexico.

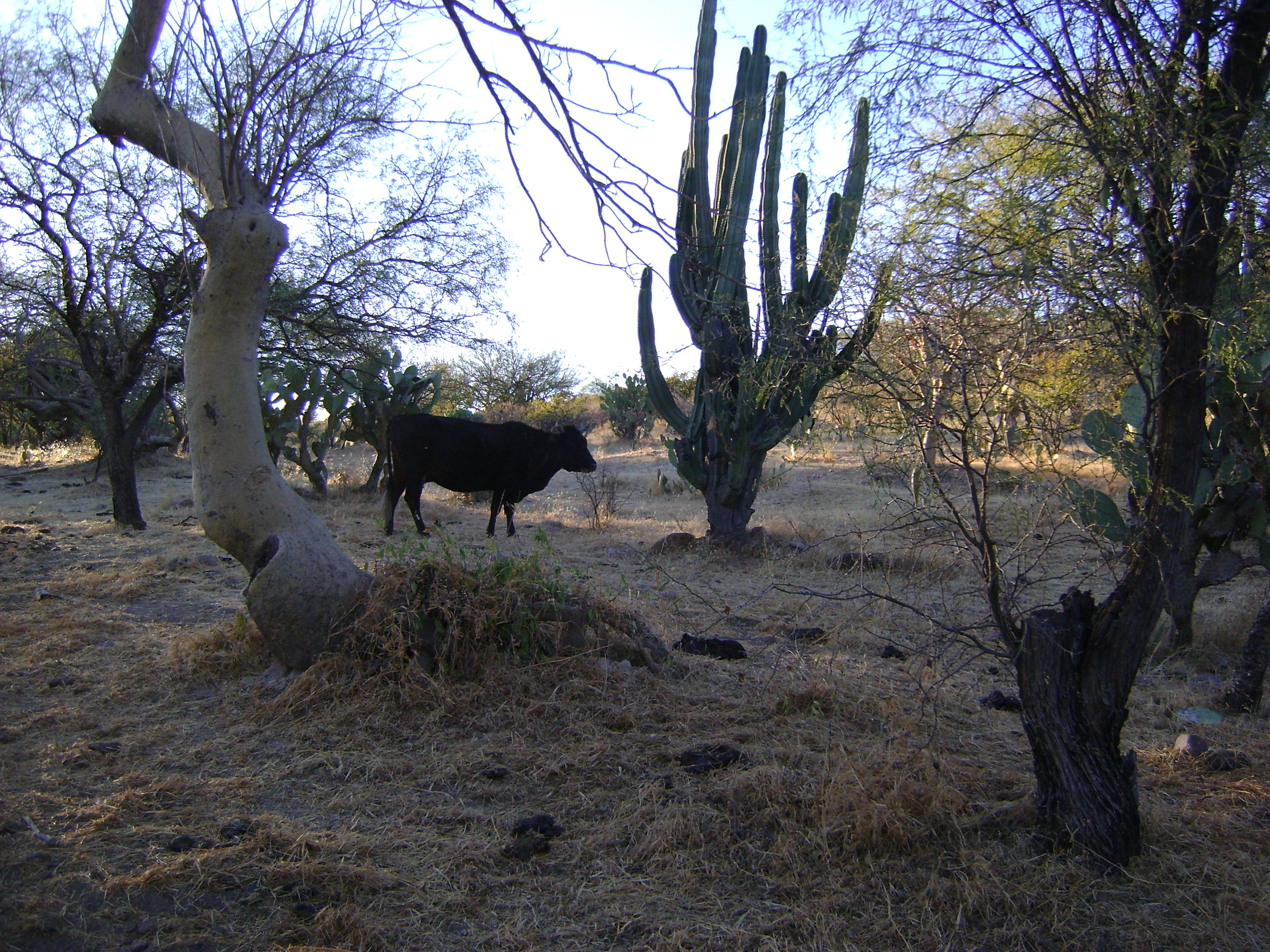
Plant growing near Calvillo, Aguascalientes

== Taxonomy ==
Stenocereus montanus was first described as Lemaireocereus montanus in 1920 by botanists Nathaniel Lord Britton and Joseph Nelson Rose. The name "montanus" is derived from Latin, meaning "native to mountains," reflecting its natural habitat. The Spanish common name for this species is "Pitaya Colorada," and in 1961, botanist Franz Buxbaum reclassified it into the genus Stenocereus.
