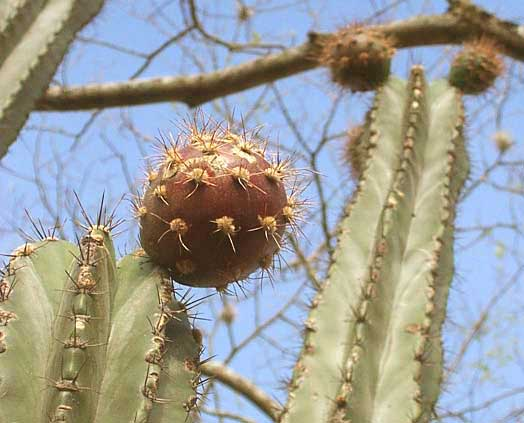
- Stenocereus huastecorum fruit

Scientific classification
- Kingdom: Plantae
- Clade: Embryophytes
- Clade: Tracheophytes
- Clade: Spermatophytes
- Clade: Angiosperms
- Clade: Eudicots
- Order: Caryophyllales
- Family: Cactaceae
- Subfamily: Cactoideae
- Genus: Stenocereus
- Species: S. huastecorum

Binomial name
- Stenocereus huastecorum Alvarado-Sizzo, Arreola-Nava & Terrazas

= Stenocereus huastecorum =

Species of flowering plant

Stenocereus huastecorum, sometimes called pitaya, is a plant species belonging to the family Cactaceae.

== Description ==
Stenocereus huastecorum is an organ pipe or candelabra-type cactus growing up to 9m tall (~30 feet). Its stems and branches are cylindrical, and furrowed lengthwise into 8 to 10 ridges about 2.5-2.8cm high (1+ inch). Atop each ridge appear special spine-bearing locations known as areoles, which are circular, pale gray, and separated from one another by 2-3cm (~0.8-1.2 inches). Spines arising from inside the areoles are of two kinds: there are three or so central spines up to 4cm long (~1.5 inch) projecting more or less upward or away from the cactus body's surface, while 10 or 11 radial spines, only up to 1cm long (~0.4 inch), lie closer to the body's surface.

Flowers grow up to 10cm long (~4 inches) and may spread to 5cm across (~2 inches). The flowers' external tepals are green with a purple hue, while internal ones are white, sometimes tinged with rose. The spherical or egg-shaped fruits are up to 5cm across, green with a red to purple hue, and covered with spines up to 1.5 cm long (~0.6 inch). When fruits are ripe, the spines fall off. The fruits' seed-bearing pulp is purple, and the small seeds are black.

== Distribution ==
According to the 2018 publication formally establishing Stenocereus huastecorum as a species, the taxon is endemic just to Mexico, mainly in the physiographic regions of the mountainous Sierra Madre Oriental and the Northeastern Coastal Plain, in the states of Tamaulipas (southern), San Luis Potosí (eastern), Querétaro (northern) and Guanajuato (eastern), plus there is a disjunct population on southern slopes of the Trans-Mexican Volcanic Belt in the state of Veracruz.

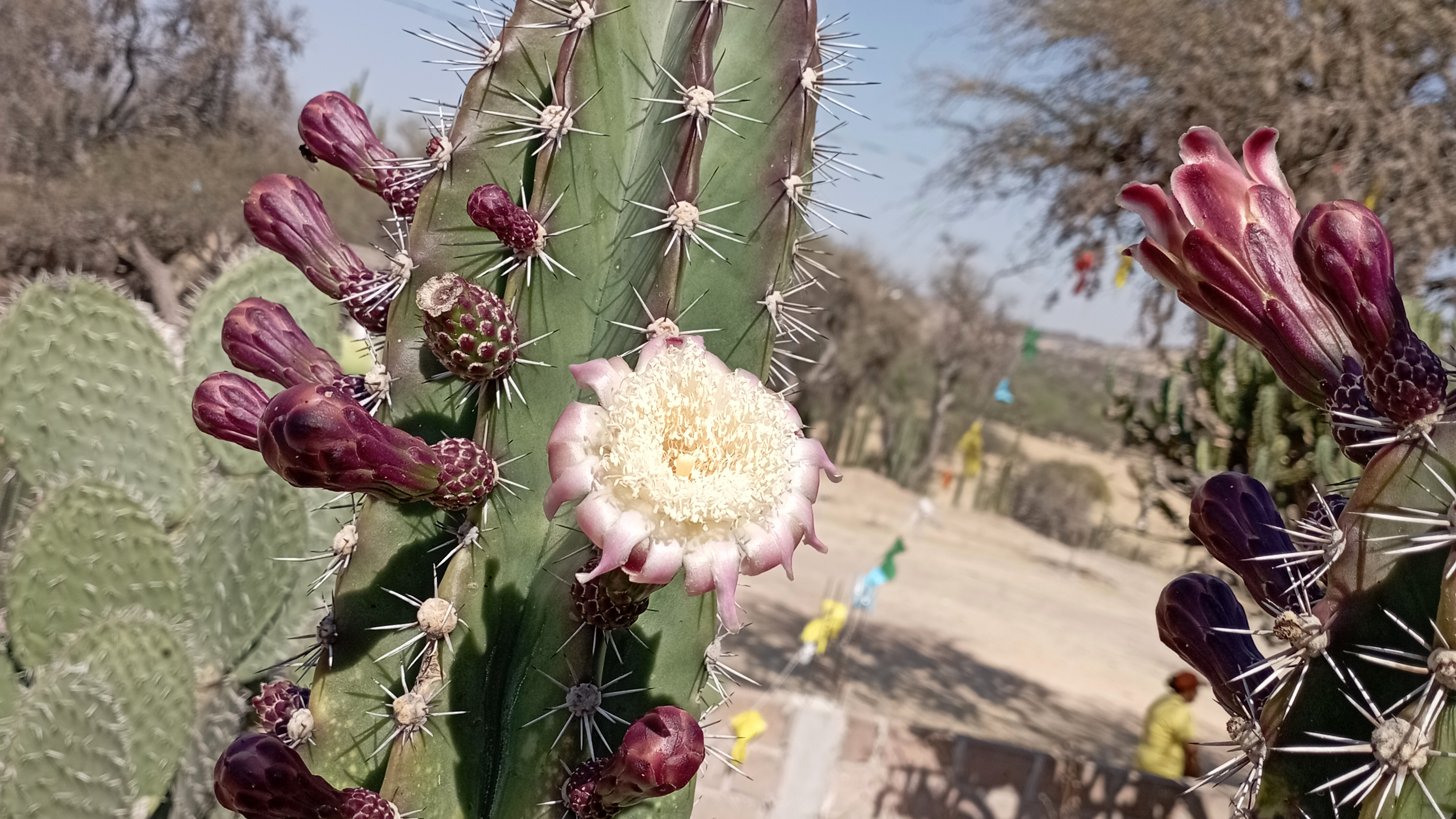
Plant blooming in El Montecillo, Guanajuato, Mexico

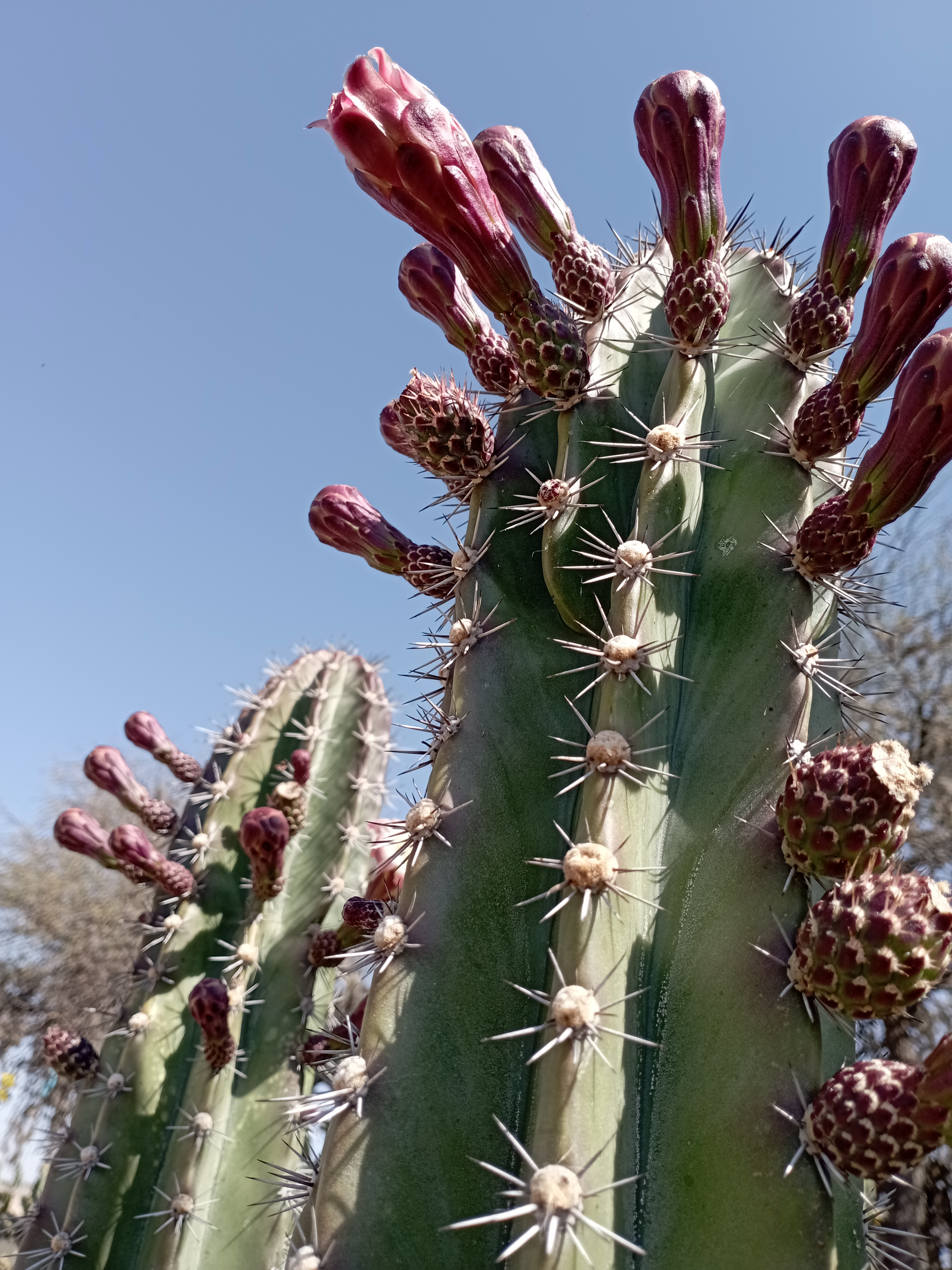

== Taxonomy ==
A grouping of cactus taxa known as "the Stenocereus griseus species complex" has been considered a puzzling group of similar-looking species sometimes displaying overlapping features. In 2018, a study was published based on a genetic analysis and ecological and morphological data of three assumed species of the complex occurring in Mexico and northern South America. The results indicated that within the populations studied a fourth species had been hiding; previously it had been considered to be an expression of S. griseus. Now that newly recognized species is known as Stenocereus huastecorum.

Adding to the earlier confusion, plants comprising the newly recognized Stenocereus huastecorum previously often had been misidentified as S. pruinosus.

== Etymology ==
The genus name Stenocereus derives from the Greek stenos meaning "narrow", and cereus, which is a Latinized form of the Greek kēros, meaning "beeswax." Cereus also is the genus name of a cactus. Some suppose that the beeswax connection is made because Cereus is a columnar cactus, vaguely similar in shape to a candle, and earlier candles often were made of beeswax.

The species name huastecorum honors Mexico's indigenous Huastec people, whose homeland largely coincides with the species' distribution area. The name Huastec is a corruption of Téenek meaning, more or less, "those who live in the countryside with their language and blood, and who share the same idea".

== Human uses ==
A web page of the Mexican government says that in Mexico pitaya fruits such as those of Stenocereus huastecorum are used to make juices, ice cream, atole, yogurt, cakes, jellies, liqueurs, sparkling wines, syrups and jams, among other edibles.

Laboratory studies indicate that the species' fruits provide an antioxidant effect, which may be explained by the juice's high content of betalains.

As any internet search on the name Stenocereus huastecorum reveals, seeds and plants are sold, under the names of pitaya, Huasteca organ pipe and others. The plants are appreciated by gardeners for their tall, striking appearance. In 2025, one merchant on Facebook sold them for "$15 per foot."
