= Stenocereus chacalapensis =

Conservation status
- Critically Endangered (IUCN 3.1)

Scientific classification
- Kingdom: Plantae
- Clade: Tracheophytes
- Clade: Angiosperms
- Clade: Eudicots
- Order: Caryophyllales
- Family: Cactaceae
- Subfamily: Cactoideae
- Genus: Stenocereus
- Species: S. chacalapensis

Binomial name
- Stenocereus chacalapensis (Bravo & T.MacDoug.) Buxb. 1961

Synonyms
- Glandulicereus chacalapensis (Bravo & T.MacDoug.) Guiggi 2012; Rathbunia chacalapensis (Bravo & T.MacDoug.) P.V.Heath 1992; Ritterocereus chacalapensis Bravo & T.MacDoug. 1957

Species of cactus

Stenocereus chacalapensis is a species of cactus in the genus Stenocereus, endemic to Mexico.

== Description ==
Stenocereus chacalapensis is an arborescent cactus that usually reaches a height of 10 to 15 meters and has many branches that resemble a chandelier. It develops a distinctive trunk, with long, erect, gray-green shoots that are held tightly and can reach a diameter of 15 centimeters. These shoots are characterized by seven slightly rounded and intact ribs. The cactus has 10 to 14 spines, varying in color from gray to black. These spines are not easily distinguished into central or radial types, and are between 5 and 28 millimeters long, the shortest emerging from the top of the ovate areole.

The fragrant white funnel-shaped flowers of Stenocereus chacalapensis bloom at night and remain open until the next day. These flowers can reach 11 centimeters long and 7 centimeters in diameter. The cactus also produces spherical brown fruits covered with many spines.

== Distribution ==
This species is endemic to the southern coastal regions of the Mexican state of Oaxaca around Santa María Huatulco, San Pedro Huamelula, San Isidro Chacalapa, and San Pedro Pochutla, growing on slopes and valleys at elevations between 20 and 230 meters. Plants are found growing along with Amphipterygium adstringens, Morisonia flexuosa, Cordia truncatifolia, Erythrostemon coccineus, Forchhammeria pallida, Guaiacum coulteri, Opuntia decumbens, Pachycereus pecten-aboriginum, Leuenbergeria lychnidiflora, Pereskiopsis diguetii, Pilosocereus collinsii and Sarcomphalus amole. Plants are pollinated by bats such as Choeronycteris mexicana.

== Taxonomy ==
Stenocereus chacalapensis was first described as Ritterocereus chacalapensis in 1957 by Helia Bravo Hollis and Thomas Baillie MacDougall. The name "chacalapensis" refers to the presence of the cactus near the Mexican city of Chacalapa, in the state of Oaxaca. In 1978, Helia Bravo Hollis reassigned it to the genus Stenocereus.
