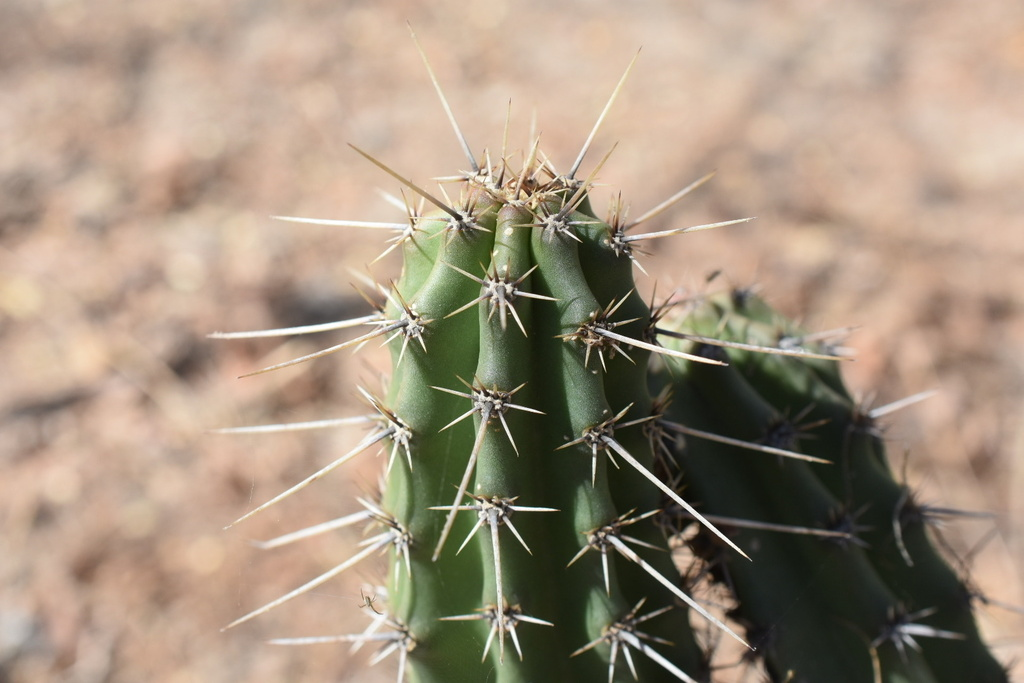

Scientific classification
- Kingdom: Plantae
- Clade: Tracheophytes
- Clade: Angiosperms
- Clade: Eudicots
- Order: Caryophyllales
- Family: Cactaceae
- Subfamily: Cactoideae
- Genus: Stenocereus
- Species: S. zopilotensis

Binomial name
- Stenocereus zopilotensis Arreola-Nava & Terrazas 2004

= Stenocereus zopilotensis =

Species of cactus

Stenocereus zopilotensis is a species of cactus in the genus Stenocereus, endemic to Mexico.

== Description ==
Stenocereus zopilotensis is a tree-like cactus that grows with candelabra-shaped branches, reaching heights of 4 to 5 meters. It has a distinct trunk that can be as tall as 45 centimeters and has a diameter of 20 centimeters. The shoots are parallel and ascending, light green in color, with diameters ranging from 6 to 11 centimeters, and typically do not branch further.

The cactus features seven to eight ribs (occasionally up to nine) that are slightly humped and narrower above the areoles. It has one to three central spines that are initially white but turn gray over time, measuring up to 1 centimeter long. These spines are awl-shaped and have a thicker base, with one central spine being up to 4.5 centimeters longer than the others. Additionally, there are seven to nine long, needle-like marginal spines that are yellowish at first but also turn gray as they mature. These marginal spines are of varying lengths, with the longest reaching up to 1.3 centimeters.

The cactus produces whitish-green flowers that bloom at night, located at the tips of the shoots. Each flower measures 6.5 to 7 centimeters in length and has a diameter of 4 to 5 centimeters. The egg-shaped to spherical fruits that follow have a diameter of 5 to 6 centimeters and are covered in fine thorns, up to 1 centimeter long, which eventually fall off.

== Distribution ==
Stenocereus zopilotensis is commonly found in the Mexican state of Guerrero, particularly in the Cañon del Zopilote, within deciduous forests at elevations between 200 and 750 meters.

== Taxonomy ==
This species was first described in 2004 by Hilda Julieta Arreola-Nava and Teresa Terrazas. The name "zopilotensis" refers to its distribution in the Cañón del Zopilote.
