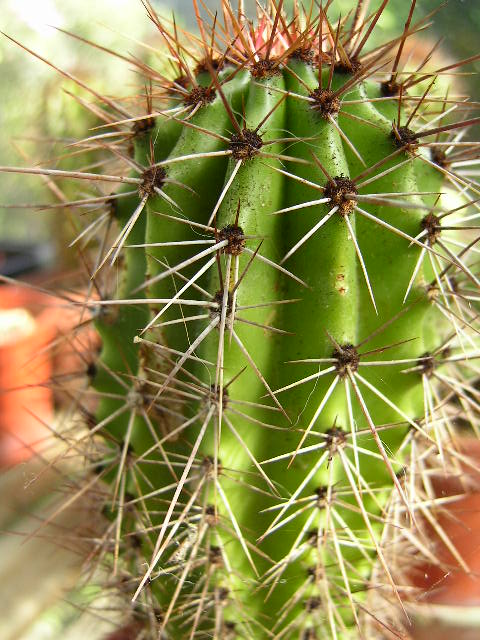
- Organ-pipe cactus Stenocereus thurberi

Scientific classification
- Kingdom: Plantae
- Clade: Embryophytes
- Clade: Tracheophytes
- Clade: Angiosperms
- Clade: Eudicots
- Order: Caryophyllales
- Family: Cactaceae
- Subfamily: Cactoideae
- Tribe: Echinocereeae
- Genus: Stenocereus (A.Berger) Riccob.

Type species
- Stenocereus stellatus

Species
- Several, see text

Synonyms
- Hertrichocereus Backeb.; Machaerocereus Britton & Rose; Neolemaireocereus Backeb.; Rathbunia Britton & Rose; Ritterocereus Backeb.

= Stenocereus =

Genus of plants

Stenocereus, from Ancient Greek στενός (stenós), meaning "narrow", and Latin cēreus, meaning "candle", is a genus of columnar or tree-like cacti from the Baja California Peninsula and other parts of Mexico, Arizona in the United States, Colombia, Costa Rica, Guatemala, Venezuela, and the West Indies. The genus has been enlarged by the addition of species from several other genera. A close relative is the peculiar chinoa or chende cactus, Polaskia chende.

== Description ==
The species within the genus exhibit varying growth habits, often resembling trees or shrubs. They can also stretch out or creep to form dense thickets, and some species develop well-formed trunks. The green shoots of these plants are cylindrical in shape and feature distinctive cylindrical ribs. From these ribs, woolly areoles are present, from which strong spines emerge. Additionally, some species may have warts, while others do not. The flowers are mostly borne near the apex of the stems, funnel- or bell-shaped, and mostly nocturnal. The stem that supports the flowers (pericarpel) is often covered with numerous spiny areoles. They are considered easy to grow and generally grow slowly.

Stenocereus thurberi (the organ-pipe cactus) is a well-known member of this genus and is widely distributed in Arizona and northern Mexico.

The fruit are similar to a dragon fruit. They are typically fleshy, up to 7.5 cm (3.0 in) in length, and adorned with thorns. The fruit tend to split open irregularly, and in most cases, the remnants of the flower remain attached until just before the fruit ripen. The seeds within the fruit are large, glossy, and usually dark black in color. They are also typically smooth in texture. Those of Stenocereus gummosus, acidic and very refreshing, are highly favored by the Seris of northwestern Mexico, who call the cactus ziix is ccapxl – "thing whose fruit is sour". It is commonly known in Spanish as pitaya agria, or by the English translation sour pitaya. S. griseus (dagger cactus) fruit, locally known as iguaraya, are relished by the Wayuu people from the Guajira Peninsula of Colombia.

Stenocereus species are often used as ornamental plants in hot and arid regions, and as noted above, some species can double as a fruit crop.

The interiors of Stenocereus trunks often grow to form tough, cane-like stakes suitable for certain kinds of construction. The Wayuu use those of dagger cactus for building wattle-and-daub walls, a technique they call yotojoro, after their name for the cactus wood "canes".

== Species ==
As of January 2026, Plants of the World Online accepts these species:

Image	Scientific name	Common name	Distribution
	Stenocereus alamosensis (J.M. Coult.) A.C. Gibson & K.E. Horak	Octopus cactus, cina	Mexico
	Stenocereus beneckei (Ehrenb.) A. Berger & Buxb.		Central Mexico
	Stenocereus chacalapensis (Bravo & T. MacDoug.) Buxb.		Oaxaca - Mexico
	Stenocereus chrysocarpus Sánchez-Mej.		Guerrero and Michoacán, Mexico
	Stenocereus eruca (Brandegee) A.C. Gibson & K.E. Horak	Creeping devil caterpillar cactus	Baja California Sur - Mexico
	Stenocereus fricii Sánchez-Mej.	Pitayo De Aguas	Colima, Jalisco, Michoacan de Ocampo - Mexico
	Stenocereus griseus (Haw.) Buxb.	Dagger cactus, yosú (Wayuunaiki)	Mexico to Venezuela
	Stenocereus gummosus (Engelm.) A. Gibson & K.E. Horak	Sour pitaya, pitaya agria, ziix is ccapxl (Cmiique iitom)	Baja California (Norte), Baja California Sur - Mexico
	Stenocereus heptagonus (L.) Mottram		Greater Antilles to Virgin Islands
	Stenocereus huastecorum Alvarado-Sizzo, Arreola-Nava & Terrazas		Northeastern and central Mexico
	Stenocereus humilis (Britton & Rose) D.R.Hunt		Central Colombia
	Stenocereus kerberi (K. Schum.) A.C. Gibson & K.E. Horak		Colima, Sinaloa - Mexico
	Stenocereus martinezii (J.G. Ortega) Buxb.	Pitahayo, Pitayo	Sinaloa - Mexico
	Stenocereus montanus (Britton & Rose) Buxb.		Chihuahua, Colima, Jalisco, Nayarit, Sinaloa, Sonora - Mexico
	Stenocereus pruinosus (Otto ex Pfeiff.) Buxb.		Chiapas, Guerrero, Oaxaca, Puebla, Tamaulipas, Veracruz-Llave - Mexico
	Stenocereus queretaroensis F.A.C.Weber ex Mathes.) Buxb.		Colima, Guanajuato, Jalisco, Michoacan de Ocampo, Queretaro de Zaragoza - Mexico
	Stenocereus quevedonis (J.G. Ortega) Buxb.	Pitire	Sinaloa - Mexico
	Stenocereus standleyi (J.G. Ortega) Buxb.	Pitaya Marismena	Guerrero, Sinaloa - Mexico
	Stenocereus stellatus (Pfeiff.) Riccob.	Baja organ pipe cactus	Oaxaca, Morelos, Puebla - Mexico
	Stenocereus thurberi (Engelm.) Buxb.	Organpipe cactus	Baja California (Norte), Baja California Sur, Sinaloa, Sonora - Mexico, Arizona - United States
	Stenocereus treleasei (Vaupel) Backeb.	Tunillo	Oaxaca - Mexico
	Stenocereus zopilotensis Arreola-Nava & Terrazas		Mexico (Guerrero)

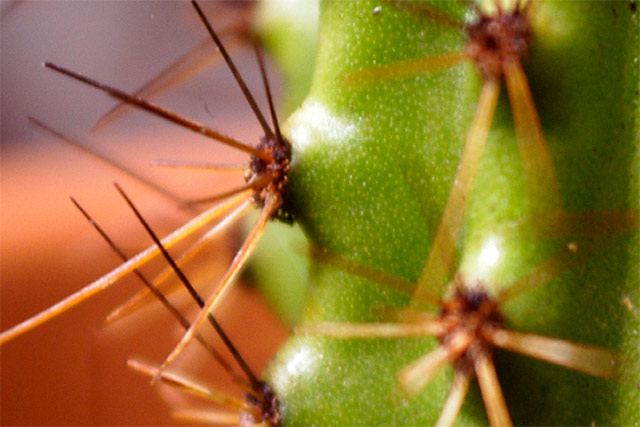
Close-up of organpipe cactus (S. thurberi) spines

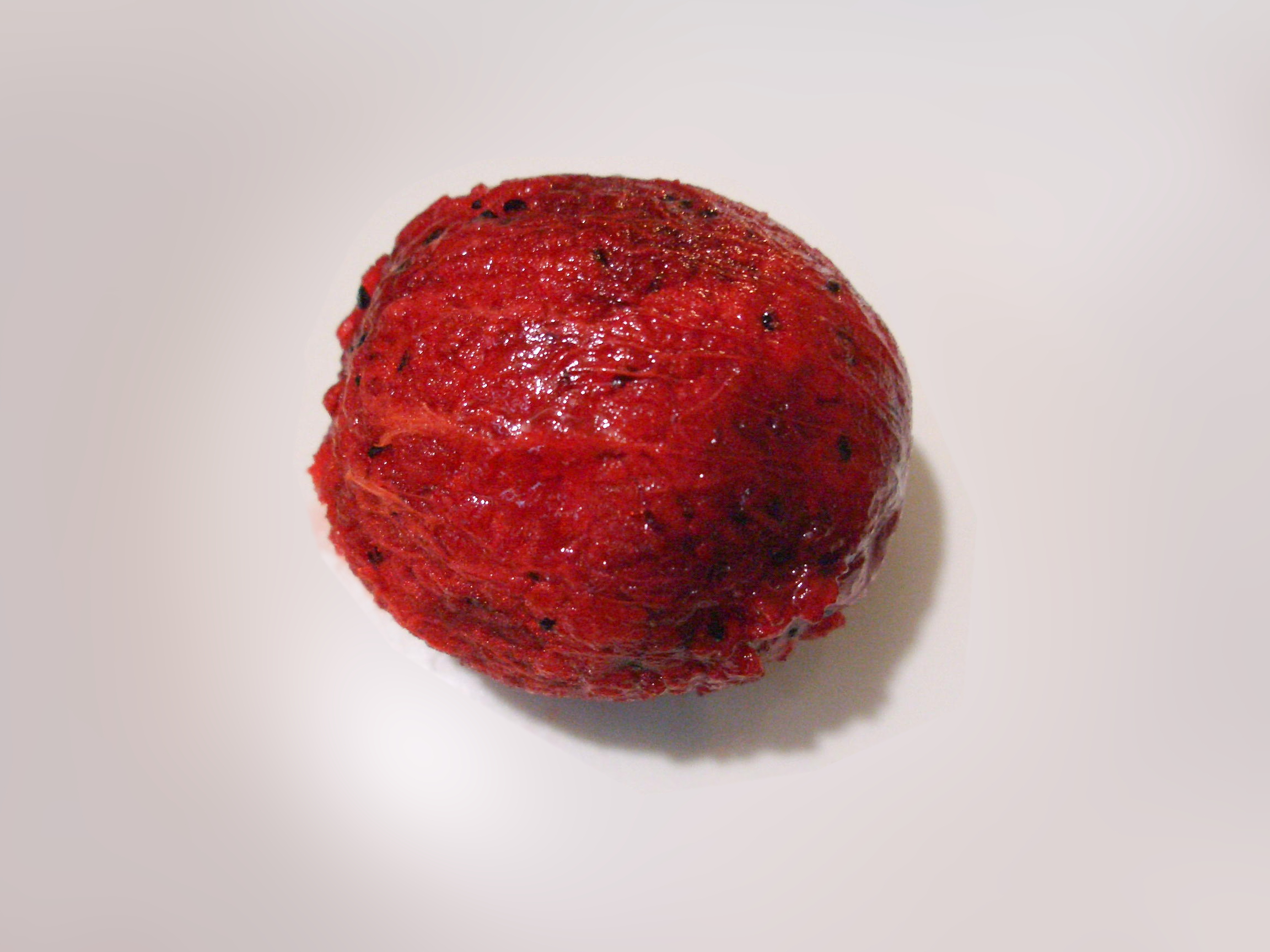
Fruit of Stenocereus queretaroensis prepared for eating

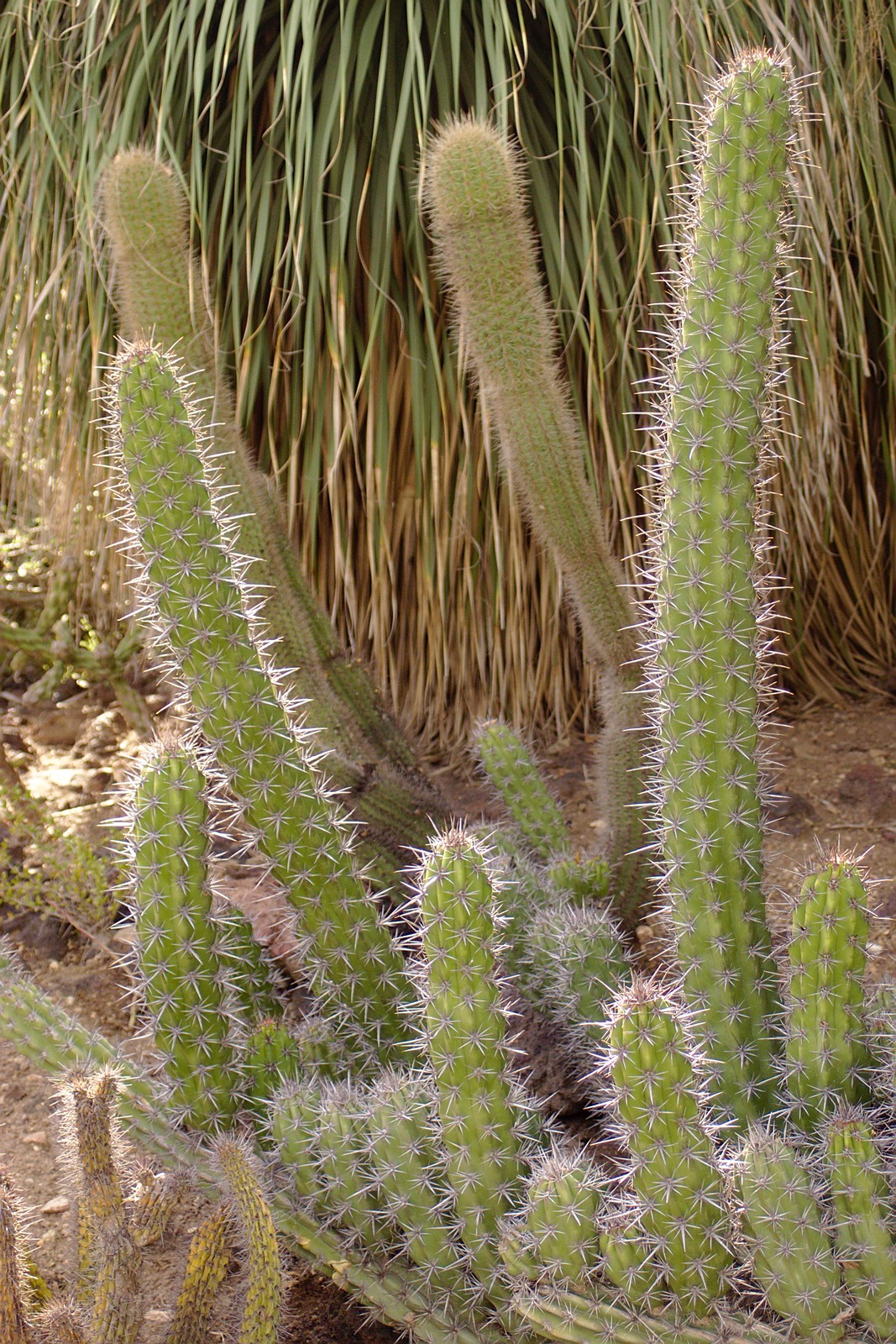
Stenocereus gummosus at the Huntington Desert Garden
