= Stenocereus humilis =

Conservation status
- Endangered (IUCN 3.1)

Scientific classification
- Kingdom: Plantae
- Clade: Embryophytes
- Clade: Tracheophytes
- Clade: Spermatophytes
- Clade: Angiosperms
- Clade: Eudicots
- Order: Caryophyllales
- Family: Cactaceae
- Subfamily: Cactoideae
- Genus: Stenocereus
- Species: S. humilis

Binomial name
- Stenocereus humilis (Britton & Rose) D.R.Hunt 2002

Synonyms
- Armatocereus humilis (Britton & Rose) Backeb. 1959; Lemaireocereus humilis Britton & Rose 1920; Ritterocereus humilis (Britton & Rose) Backeb. 1951

Species of cactus

Stenocereus humilis is a species of cactus in the genus Stenocereus, endemic to Colombia.

== Description ==
Stenocereus humilis is a shrub characterized by irregularly branched shoots, often forming dense thickets. The shoots are weak and dark green, measuring between 1 and 4 meters in length and reaching a diameter of up to 4 centimeters. They have three to six interrupted ribs, with woolly areoles located in their notches. The plant features five to eight needle-like spines that start off brown and later turn whitish, measuring 1 to 2 centimeters in length.

The flowers of Stenocereus humilis are funnel-shaped, greenish-white, and can grow up to 6 centimeters in length. The spherical fruits are heavily spined and can reach up to 4 centimeters in length.

== Distribution ==
This species is commonly found in the Cauca department of Colombia, particularly in the valley of the Río Dagua at altitudes between 700 and 1,000 meters.

== Taxonomy ==
Originally described as Lemaireocereus humilis in 1920 by Nathaniel Lord Britton and Joseph Nelson Rose, the name "humilis" is derived from Latin, meaning "low." In 2002, David Richard Hunt reclassified the species into the genus Stenocereus.
