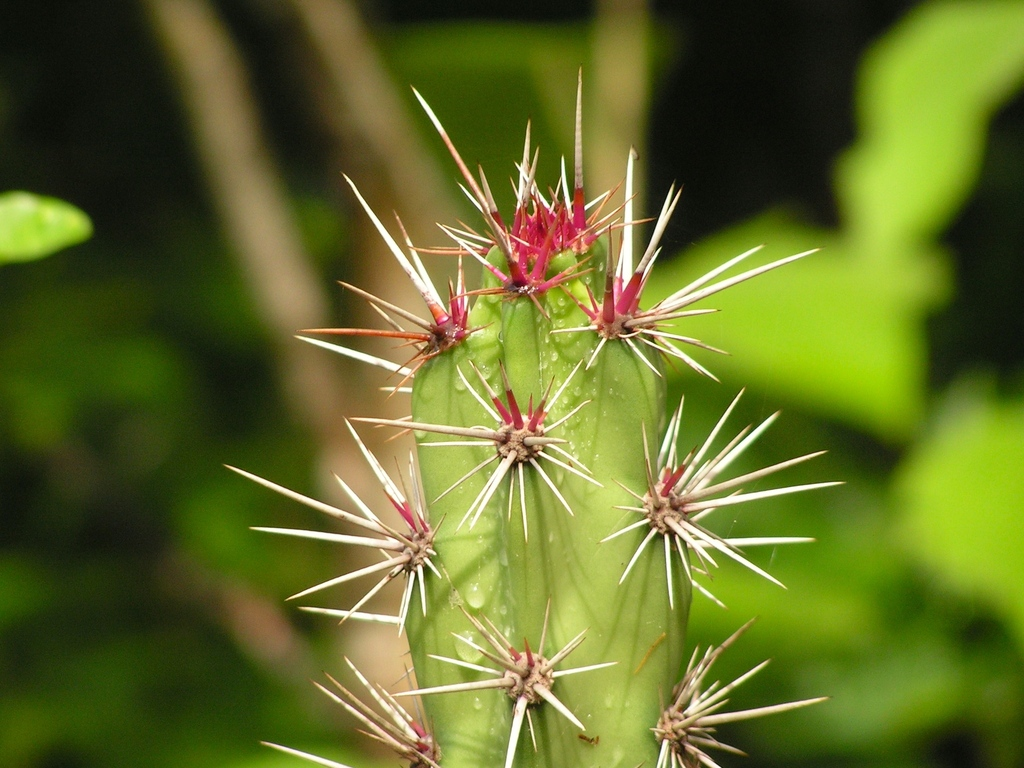

Conservation status
- Least Concern (IUCN 3.1)

Scientific classification
- Kingdom: Plantae
- Clade: Tracheophytes
- Clade: Angiosperms
- Clade: Eudicots
- Order: Caryophyllales
- Family: Cactaceae
- Subfamily: Cactoideae
- Genus: Stenocereus
- Species: S. kerberi

Binomial name
- Stenocereus kerberi (K. Schum.) A.C. Gibson & K.E. Horak 1978 publ. 1979

Synonyms
- Cereus kerberi K.Schum. 1897; Cleistocactus kerberi (K.Schum.) Rol.-Goss. 1904; Rathbunia kerberi (K.Schum.) Britton & Rose 1909

= Stenocereus kerberi =

Species of cactus

Stenocereus kerberi is a species of cactus in the genus Stenocereus, endemic to Mexico.

== Description ==
Stenocereus kerberi is a columnar cactus that can grow to heights of 2 to 3 meters and often forms dense clusters of branched shoots. The shoots are distinctly angular in cross-section, measuring 3 to 8 cm in diameter. Each shoot has four notched ribs, which are divided into noticeable humps. It features one to four grayish central spines that are 4 to 5 cm long, along with 10 to 16 grayish radial spines that range from 1 to 2 cm in length. The cactus produces slender, funnel-shaped flowers that are deep pink and open during the day, measuring 10 to 12 cm in length. Its spherical, red fruits can be up to 2.5 cm in diameter and retain remnants of the flower.

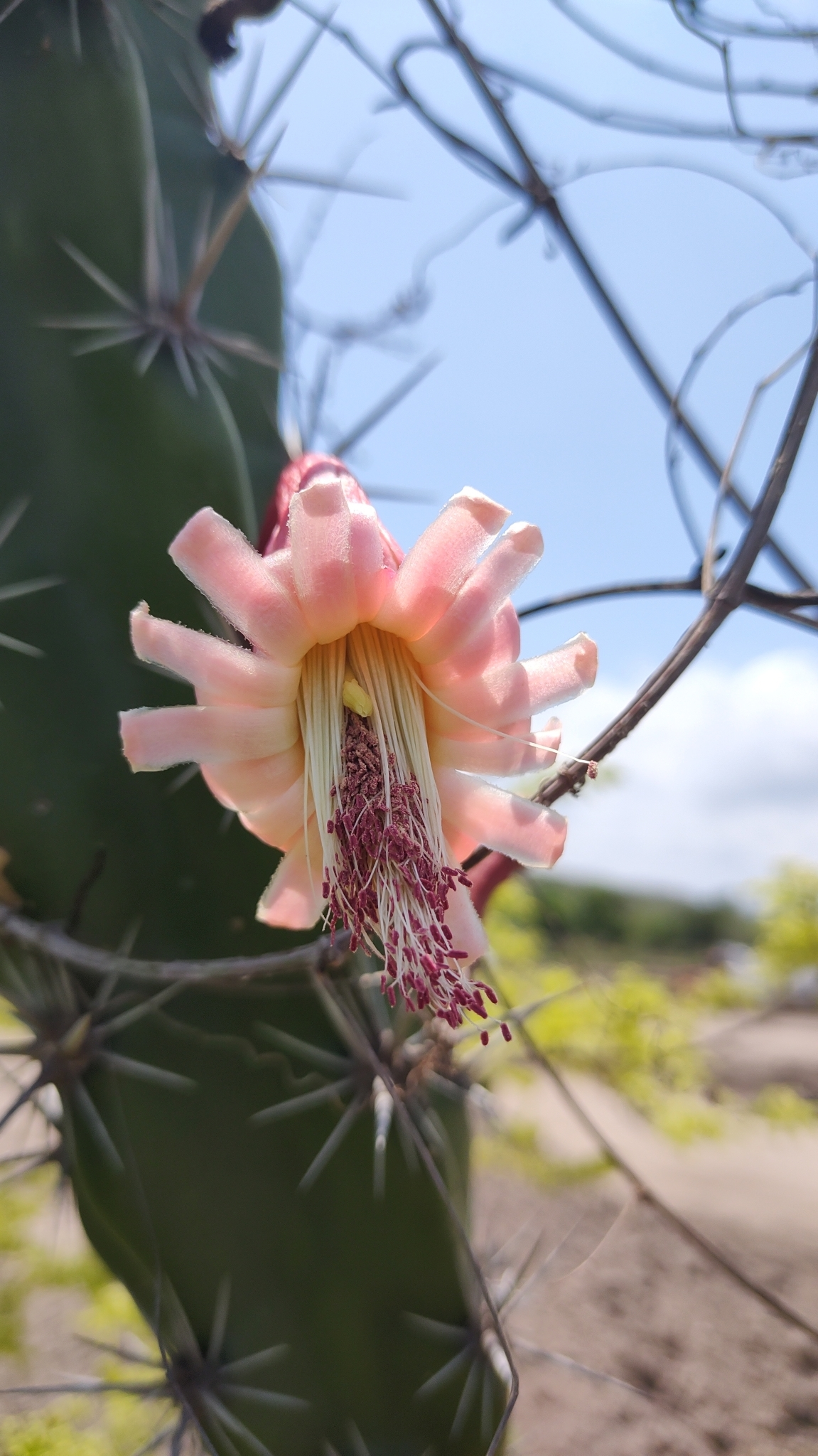
Flower

== Distribution and habitat ==
Stenocereus kerberi is endemic to Mexico, being found within the Mexican states of Colima, Jalisco, Nayarit, and Sinaloa. The species grows in tropical deciduous forest at elevations ranging between 0 and 800 meters above sea level.

== Taxonomy ==
This species was first described as Cereus kerberi by Karl Moritz Schumann in 1897. The name "kerberi" honors Edmund Kerber, who collected cacti in Mexico and sent samples to Berlin. In 1979, Arthur Charles Gibson and Karl E. Horak reclassified it into the genus Stenocereus.
