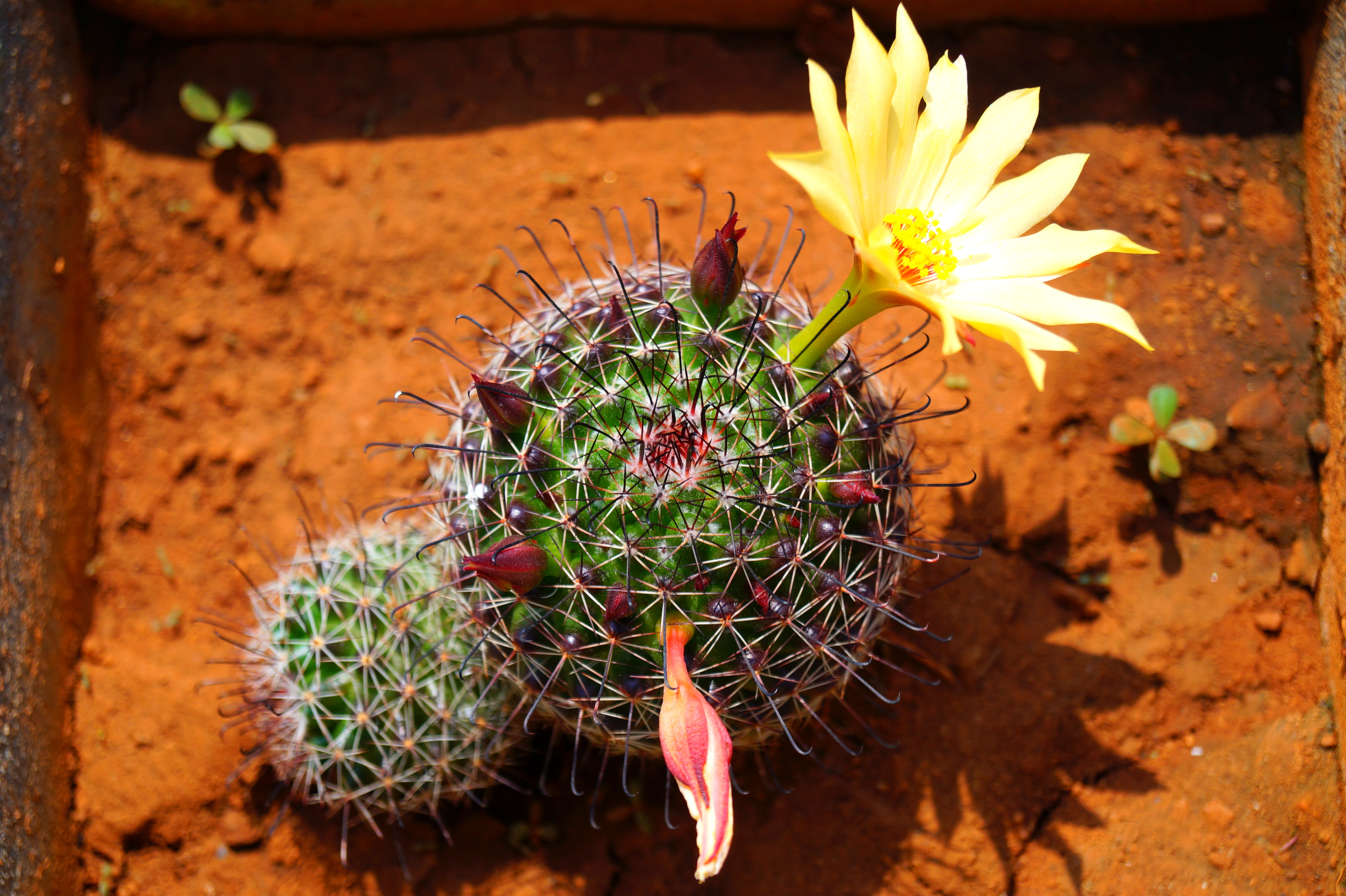
- Mammillaria beneckei var. balsasoides

Conservation status
- Least Concern (IUCN 3.1)

Scientific classification
- Kingdom: Plantae
- Clade: Tracheophytes
- Clade: Angiosperms
- Clade: Eudicots
- Order: Caryophyllales
- Family: Cactaceae
- Subfamily: Cactoideae
- Genus: Mammillaria
- Species: M. beneckei

Binomial name
- Mammillaria beneckei C.Ehrenb. (1844)

Synonyms
- Cactus beneckei (C.Ehrenb.) Kuntze; Dolichothele beneckei (C.Ehrenb.) Backeb.; Dolichothele nelsonii (Britton & Rose) Backeb.; Mammillaria balsasoides R.T.Craig; Mammillaria barkeri Shurly ex Backeb.; Mammillaria colonensis R.T.Craig; Mammillaria guiengolensis Bravo & T.MacDoug.; Neomammillaria nelsonii Britton & Rose; Oehmea beneckei (C.Ehrenb.) Buxb.

= Mammillaria beneckei =

Species of cactus

Mammillaria beneckei is a species of flowering plant in the cactus family Cactaceae, native to western and central Mexico.

== Description ==
Mammillaria beneckei is a small, variable cactus, typically forming low-growing clusters. It is usually solitary at first, later offsetting to form clumps that can reach 50 cm (20 in) or more in width.

The anthers are orange.

== Distribution and habitat ==
The species is endemic to western and central Mexico, occurring in the states of Colima, Guerrero, Jalisco, Michoacán, México, Nayarit, Oaxaca, and Sinaloa.

Its natural habitat is tropical deciduous forests and dry shrublands at elevations from sea level up to 1,600 m (5,200 ft). The species is often found growing on rocky slopes in association with other cacti and succulents, such as Backebergia militaris, Stenocereus marginatus, and Mammillaria mazatlanensis.

== Taxonomy ==
The species was first described by the German botanist Christian Gottfried Ehrenberg in 1844 in Botanische Zeitung (Berlin). The specific epithet honors the Berlin-based trader Stephan (Etienne) Benecke (1800–1877), who emigrated to Mexico, where he was the German consul of Mexico and in 1875 founded the Camara Nacional de Comercio.

The species is highly variable, and several forms have been described as separate species or varieties, including Mammillaria balsasoides, Mammillaria colonensis, and Mammillaria guiengolensis. These are now considered synonyms.

== Conservation ==
Mammillaria beneckei is listed as Least Concern (LC) on the IUCN Red List. The species is widespread and abundant within its range, and no major threats have been identified. However, like all cacti, it is listed in Appendix II of the Convention on International Trade in Endangered Species of Wild Fauna and Flora (CITES), which regulates international trade to prevent unsustainable harvesting.

== Cultivation ==
Beyond its native Mexico, M. beneckei has become a widely grown ornamental cactus in India.

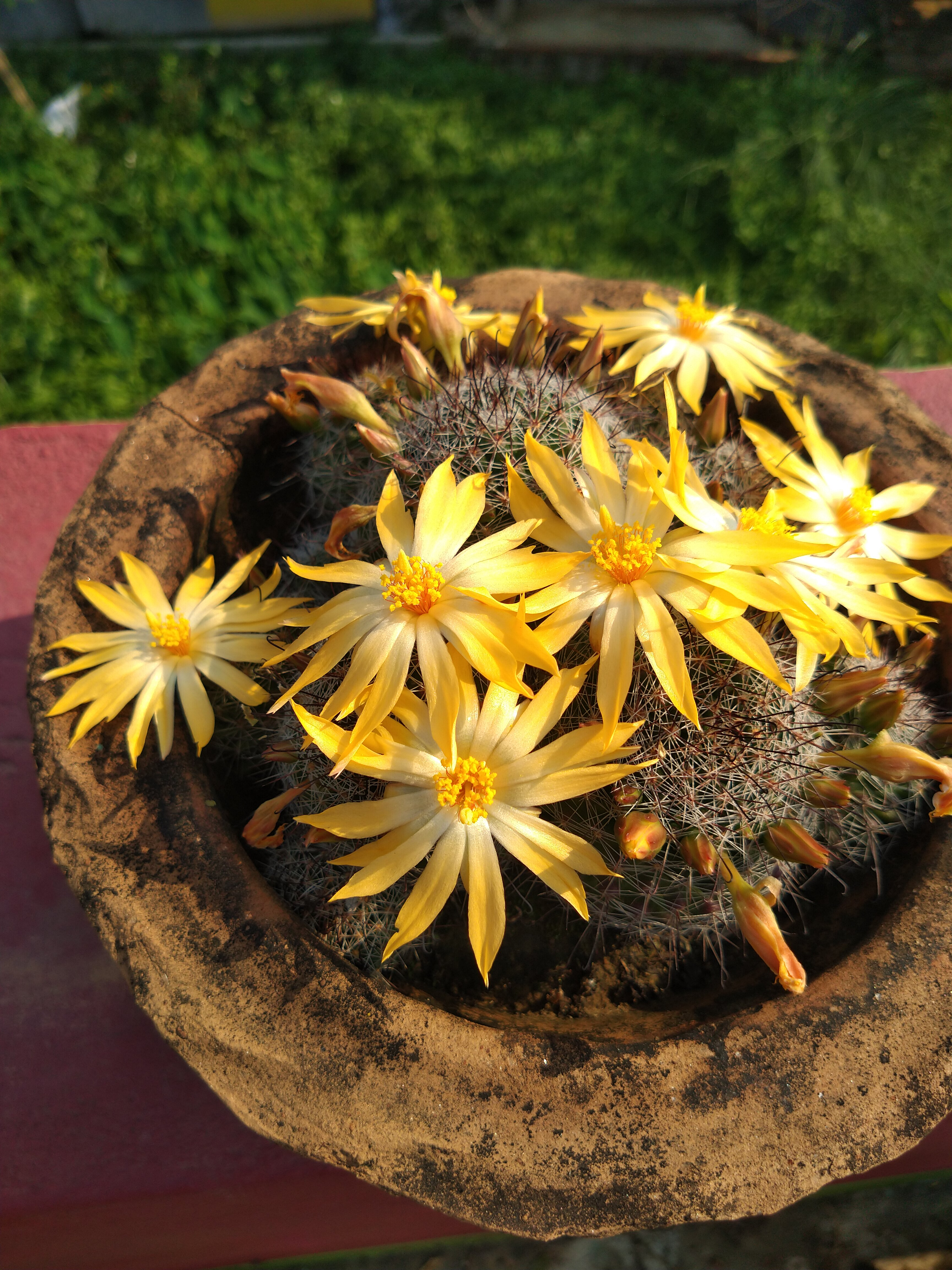
The flowers of Mammillaria benechei

== Common names ==
Common names for Mammillaria beneckei include:

- Benecke's fishhook cactus (English)
- Benecke's nipple cactus (English)
- Guiengola cactus (English)
- Biznaga de benecke (Spanish)
- Biznaga del cerro guiengola (Spanish)
