= Pachycereus tepamo =

Conservation status
- Least Concern (IUCN 3.1)

Scientific classification
- Kingdom: Plantae
- Clade: Tracheophytes
- Clade: Angiosperms
- Clade: Eudicots
- Order: Caryophyllales
- Family: Cactaceae
- Subfamily: Cactoideae
- Genus: Pachycereus
- Species: P. tepamo

Binomial name
- Pachycereus tepamo Gama & S.Arias

Species of cactus

Pachycereus tepamo is a species of Pachycereus found in Mexico.

== Description ==
Pachycereus tepamo is a tree-like cactus that can grow to heights of 7 to 10 meters, and occasionally up to 12 meters. It develops a trunk that can reach up to 1 meter in height, with bluish-green, upright shoots branching out from the base, each approximately 20 centimeters in diameter. The shoots typically have 8 to 9 ribs, although they can occasionally have 7 to 10. Each shoot features woolly areoles that are about 2.5 centimeters long, from which arise strong, stiff thorns that can be whitish-gray or black at their base and tip. There are usually four, and rarely five, central spines that have a polygonal cross-section and can grow up to 4.5 centimeters long. Among these, two spines point downward, one points upward, and one protrudes outward. Additionally, there are six to eleven flattened, stiff radial spines ranging from 5 to 30 millimeters in length.

The areoles capable of flowering are circular and woolly, producing 17 to 45 thorns that can be up to 6 centimeters long, without a clear distinction between central and peripheral types. Funnel-shaped flowers emerge near the tips of the shoots, opening at night and measuring 6 to 8 centimeters long. The pericarpel of the flowers is fully covered in yellow bristles, while the flower tube features somewhat purple-colored scales with bare axils. The plant also produces spherical, fleshy, red-purple fruits that are ripening, characterized by areoles covered in straw-yellow wool and numerous 3-centimeter-long bristles.

== Distribution ==
Pachycereus tepamo is primarily found in the Mexican state of Michoacán, specifically in the lower catchment area of the Río Balsas within tropical deciduous forests, at altitudes ranging from 160 to 1,100 meters.

== Taxonomy ==
The species was first described in 1998 by Susana Gama-López and Salvador Arias. The specific name 'tepamo' is derived from its common name in Spanish.
