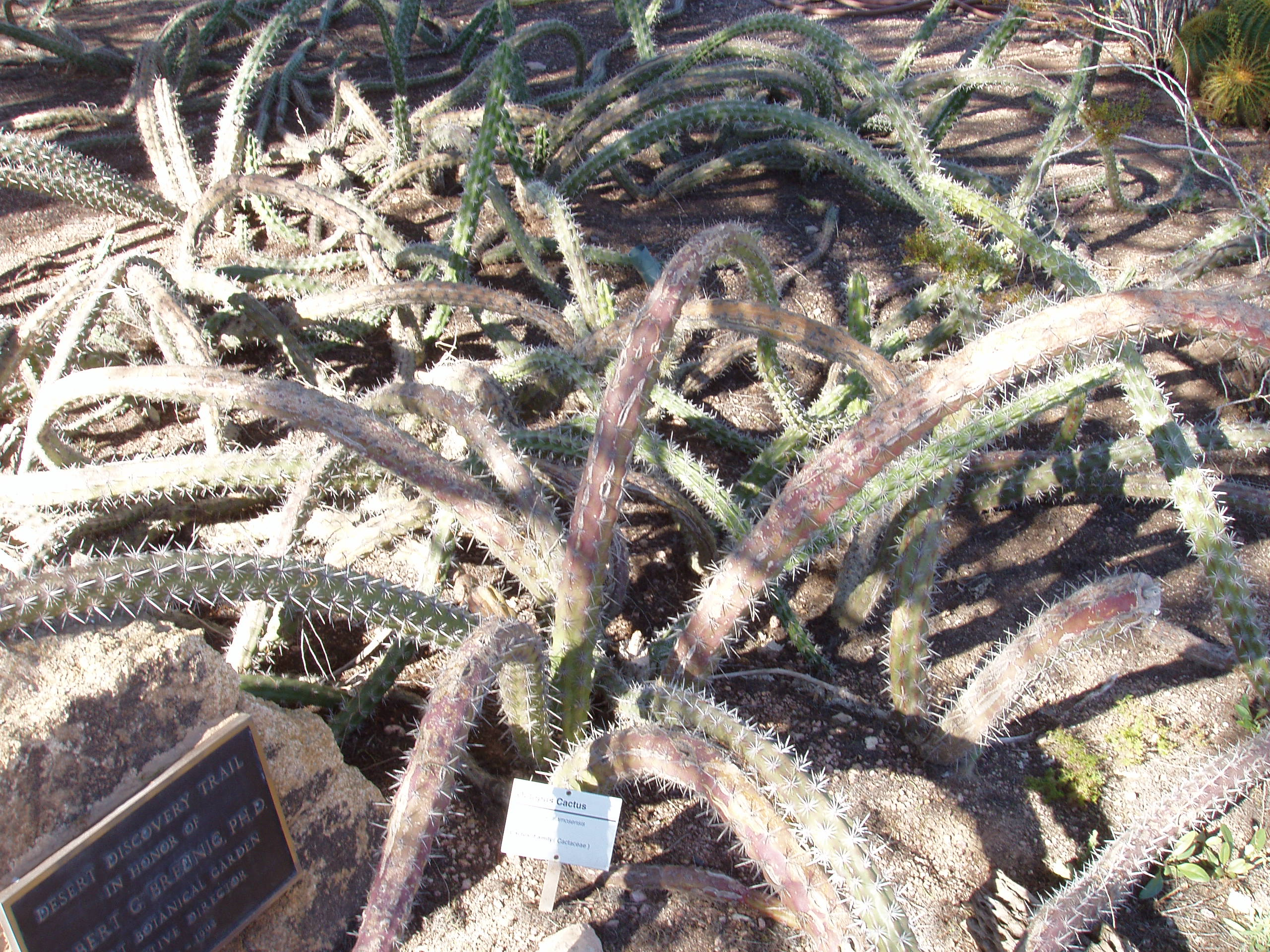

Conservation status
- Vulnerable (IUCN 3.1)

Scientific classification
- Kingdom: Plantae
- Clade: Tracheophytes
- Clade: Angiosperms
- Clade: Eudicots
- Order: Caryophyllales
- Family: Cactaceae
- Subfamily: Cactoideae
- Genus: Stenocereus
- Species: S. alamosensis

Binomial name
- Stenocereus alamosensis (J.M.Coult.) A.C.Gibson & K.E.Horak

Synonyms
- Cereus alamosensis J.M.Coult. 1896; Rathbunia alamosensis (J.M.Coult.) Britton & Rose 1909; Cereus pseudosonorensis Gürke 1910; Cereus sonorensis K.Schum. 1901; Rathbunia alamosensis f. cristata P.V.Heath 1992; Rathbunia alamosensis var. sonorensis (K.Schum.) P.V.Heath 1992; Rathbunia neosonorensis Backeb. 1960; Rathbunia pseudosonorensis (Gürke) A.Berger 1929; Rathbunia sonorensis (K.Schum.) Britton & Rose 1909; Stenocereus alamosensis f. cristatus (P.V.Heath) P.V.Heath 1996; Stenocereus alamosensis var. sonorensis (K.Schum.) P.V.Heath 1996

= Stenocereus alamosensis =

Octopus Cactus

Species of cactus

Stenocereus alamosensis (octopus cactus or cina) is a species of cactus native to Mexico.

== Description ==
Stenocereus alamosensis is a shrub-like cactus with bluish-green, columnar, and often arched shoots up to 8 cm in diameter, reaching 2–4 meters in height. Its stems have 5–8 slightly arched ribs, about 1 cm high. The cactus features 1–4 strong, protruding, whitish central spines up to 4.5 cm long, and 11–18 whitish marginal spines measuring 1.3–2.2 cm. The tubular red flowers bloom during the day, measuring 7–10 cm in length and 2–3 cm in diameter, with reflexed bracts. The spherical red fruits, typically bare when ripe, have a persistent flower remnant and are 3–4.5 cm in diameter.

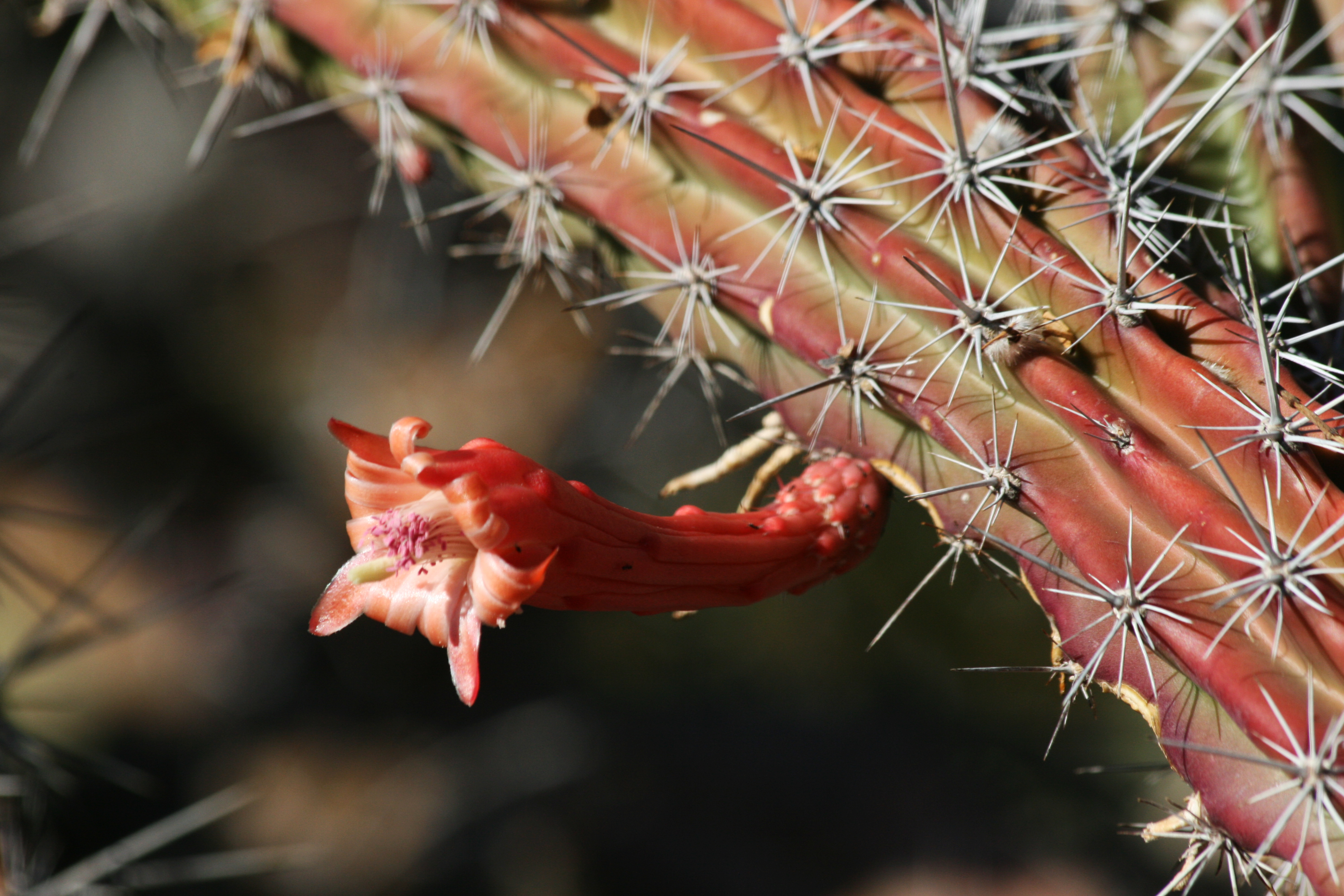
Flowers

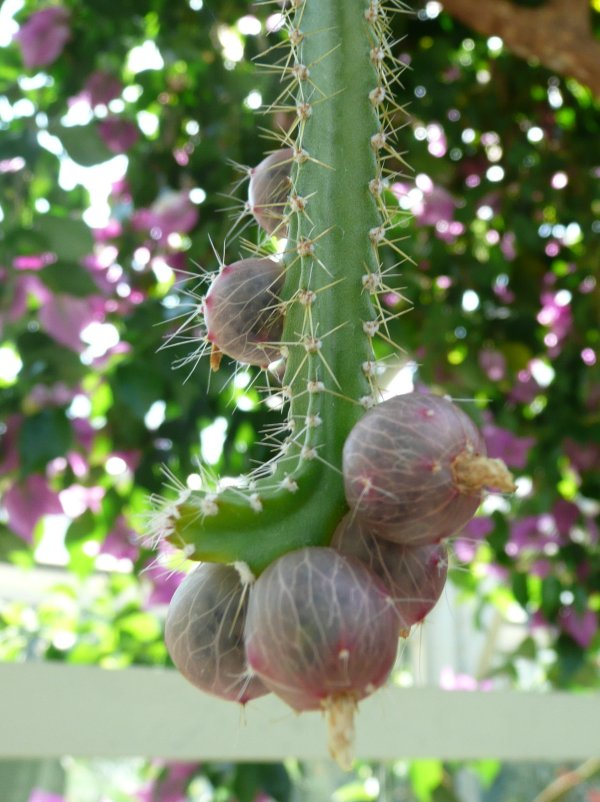
Fruits

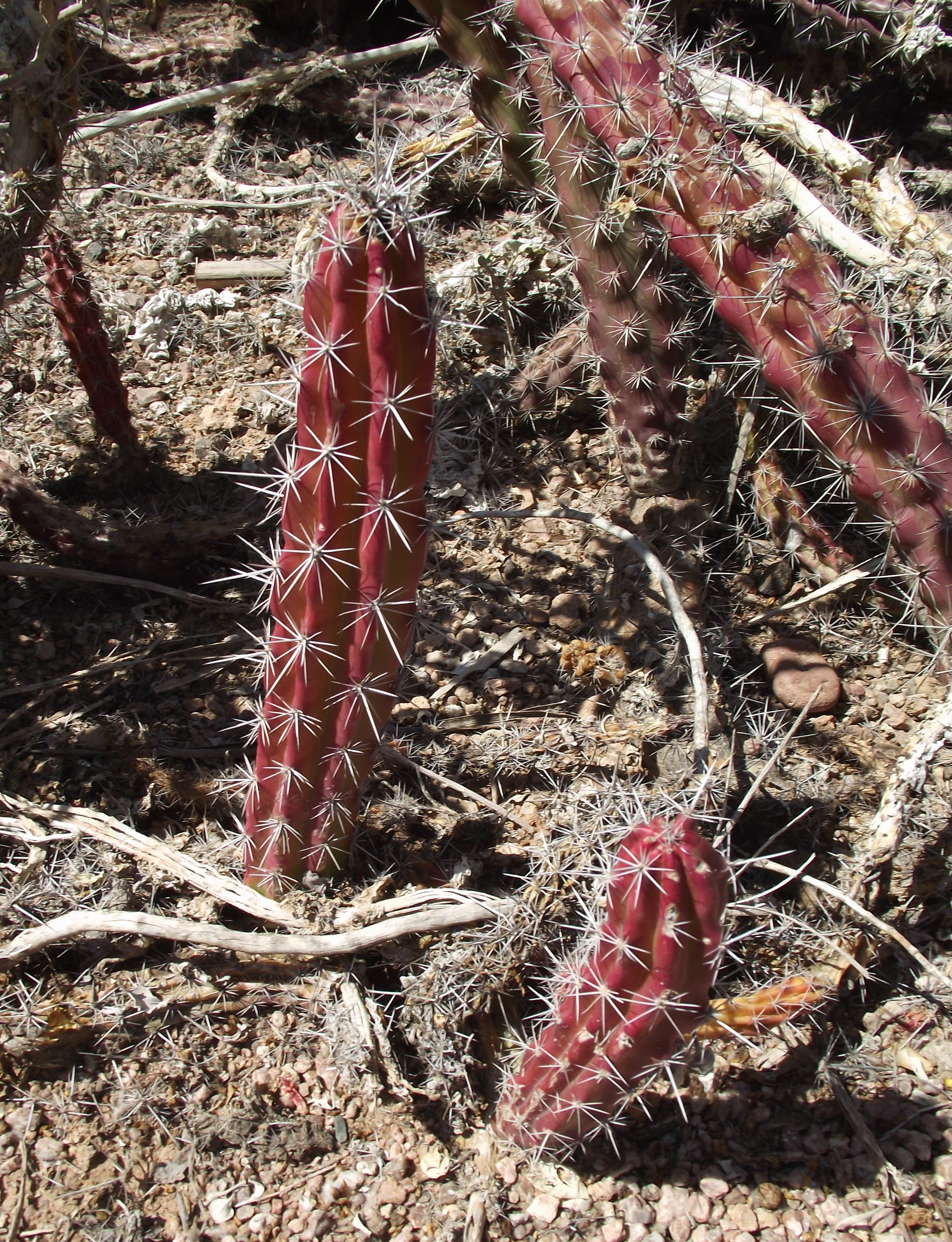
Plant

== Distribution ==
Native to Sonora and Sinaloa, Mexico, Stenocereus alamosensis grows at altitudes of 0 to 800 meters. It is viviparous (that is, the seeds germinate before leaving the parent plant), apparently an adaptation to living in coastal plains which are prone to flooding.

== Taxonomy ==
It was first described as Cereus alamosensis by John Merle Coulter in 1896, with its name referencing its occurrence near the city of Álamos. In 1979, Arthur Charles Gibson and Karl E. Horak reclassified it under the genus Stenocereus. The Seri people of Sonora call this cactus xasaacoj. The specific epithet, alamosensis, refers to the plant's occurrence at Álamos in the Mexican state of Sonora, in northwestern Mexico. Spanish common names include "Cina," "Nacido," "Sina," and "Tasajo."

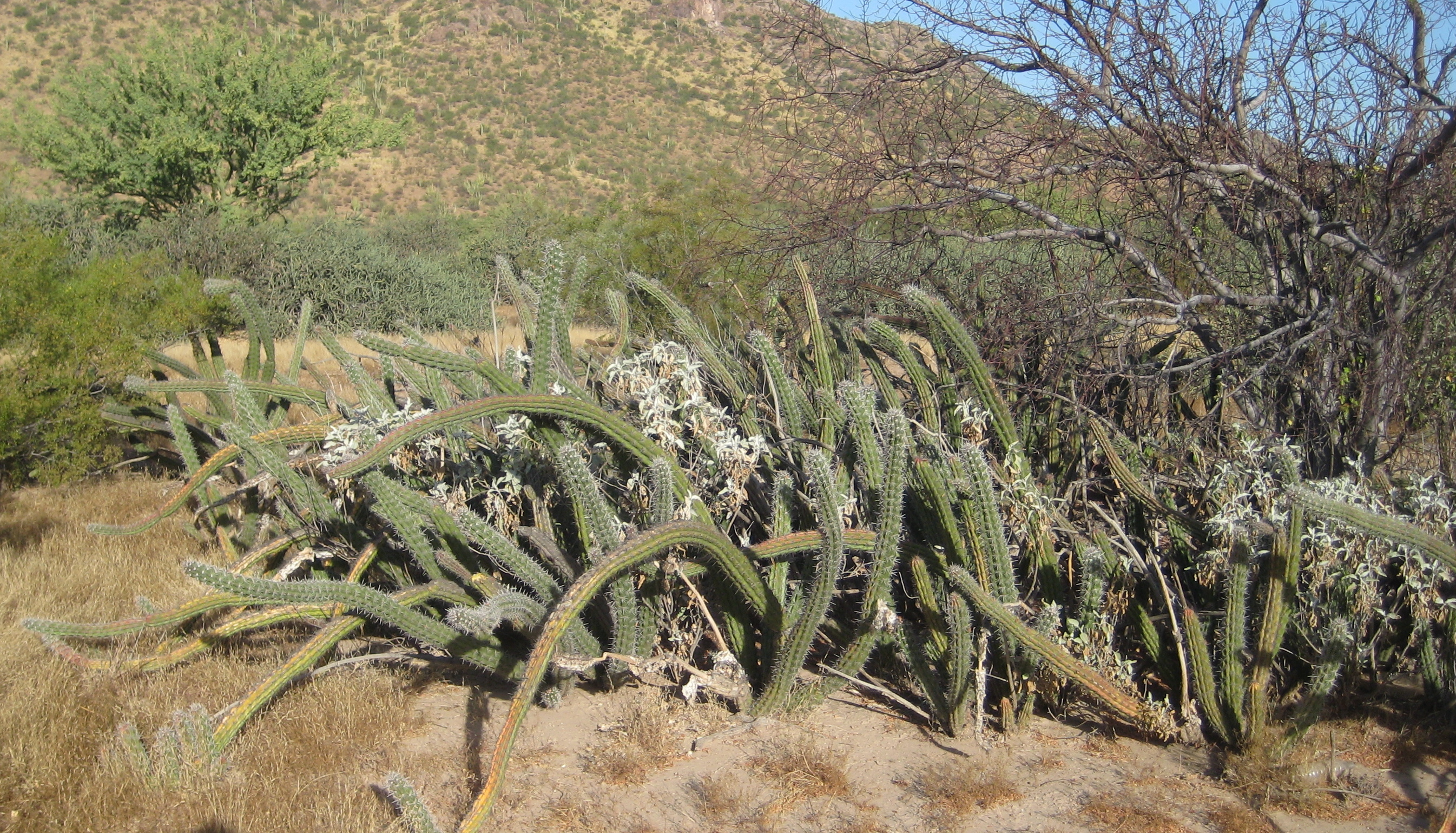
Stenocereus alamosensis west of Hermosillo, Sonora, Mexico

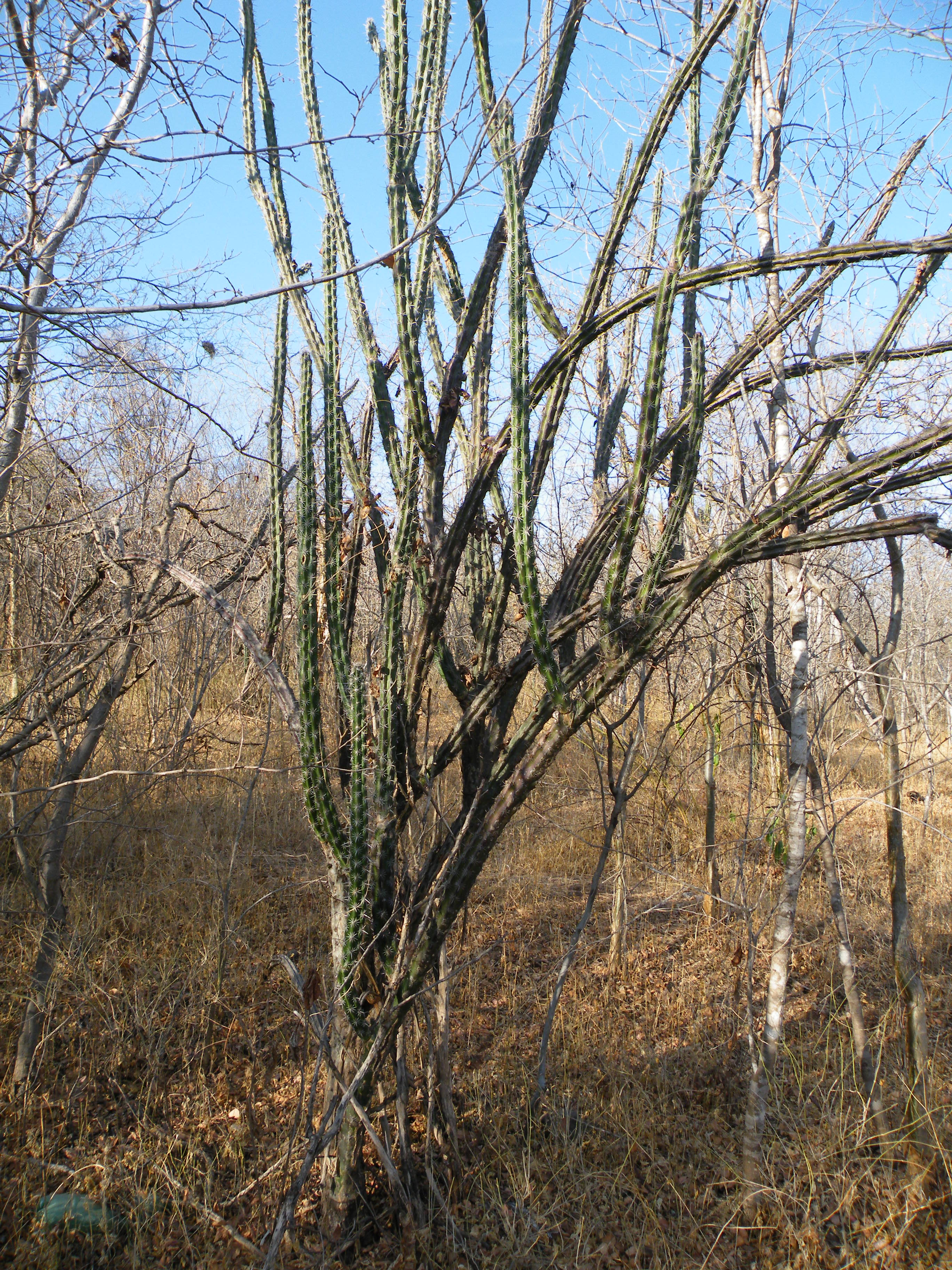
Stenocereus alamosensis growing in habitat in Guamuchil, Sinaloa
