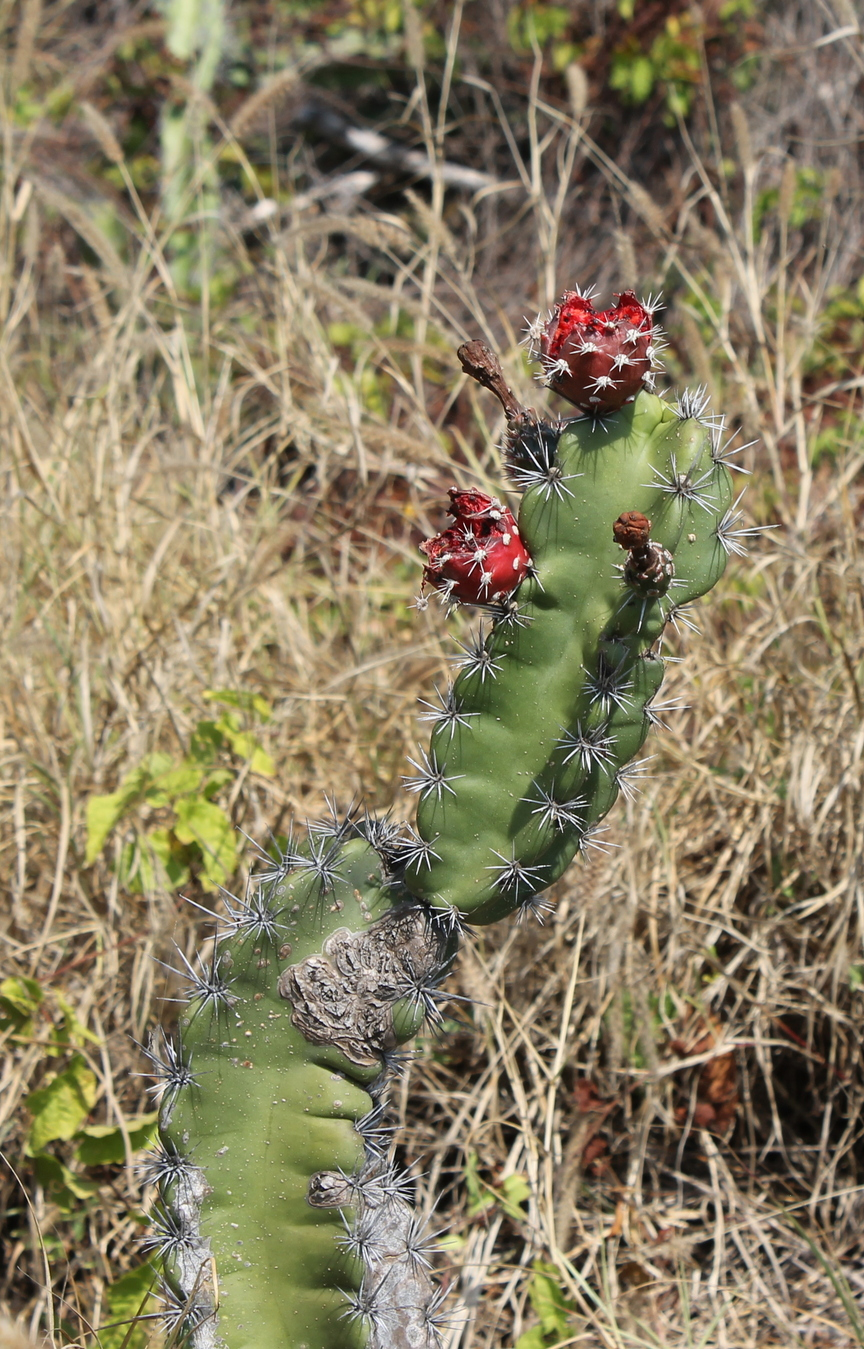

Conservation status
- Least Concern (IUCN 3.1)

Scientific classification
- Kingdom: Plantae
- Clade: Tracheophytes
- Clade: Angiosperms
- Clade: Eudicots
- Order: Caryophyllales
- Family: Cactaceae
- Subfamily: Cactoideae
- Genus: Stenocereus
- Species: S. standleyi

Binomial name
- Stenocereus standleyi (J.G.Ortega) Buxb. 1961

Synonyms
- Lemaireocereus standleyi J.G.Ortega 1929; Rathbunia standleyi (J.G.Ortega) P.V.Heath 1992; Ritterocereus standleyi (J.G.Ortega) Backeb. 1942

= Stenocereus standleyi =

Species of cactus

Stenocereus standleyi is a species of cactus in the genus Stenocereus, endemic to Mexico.

== Description ==
Stenocereus standleyi typically grows in a spreading or slightly tree-like form, featuring numerous branching shoots and reaching heights of 2 to 4 meters without a distinct trunk. The light green shoots can be up to 8 centimeters in diameter and usually have four broad, notched ribs. They possess four to six central spines, which start off reddish and become gray as they age, measuring 2 to 2.5 centimeters long. Additionally, there are 10 to 16 radial spines, each 10 to 15 millimeters long, which also turn gray over time. The plant produces narrow, bell-shaped white flowers that bloom at night and measure 6 to 8 centimeters in length. Its egg-shaped reddish fruits, which reach a diameter of 3 to 4 centimeters with red or orange pulp and black seeds. Fruits are covered in curved areoles.

== Distribution ==
Stenocereus standleyi is commonly found in several Mexican states, including Colima, Guerrero, Jalisco, Michoacán, Nayarit, and Sinaloa.

== Taxonomy ==
This species was first described in 1927 as Lemaireocereus standleyi by botanist Jesús González Ortega. The species name, standleyi, honors American botanist Paul Carpenter Standley. In 1961, Franz Buxbaum reclassified the species under the genus Stenocereus.
