= Franz Buxbaum =

Austrian botanist

Franz Buxbaum (25 February 1900 in Liebenau, Graz – 7 February 1979) was an Austrian botanist, specialising in cacti. Neobuxbaumia is named after him.
