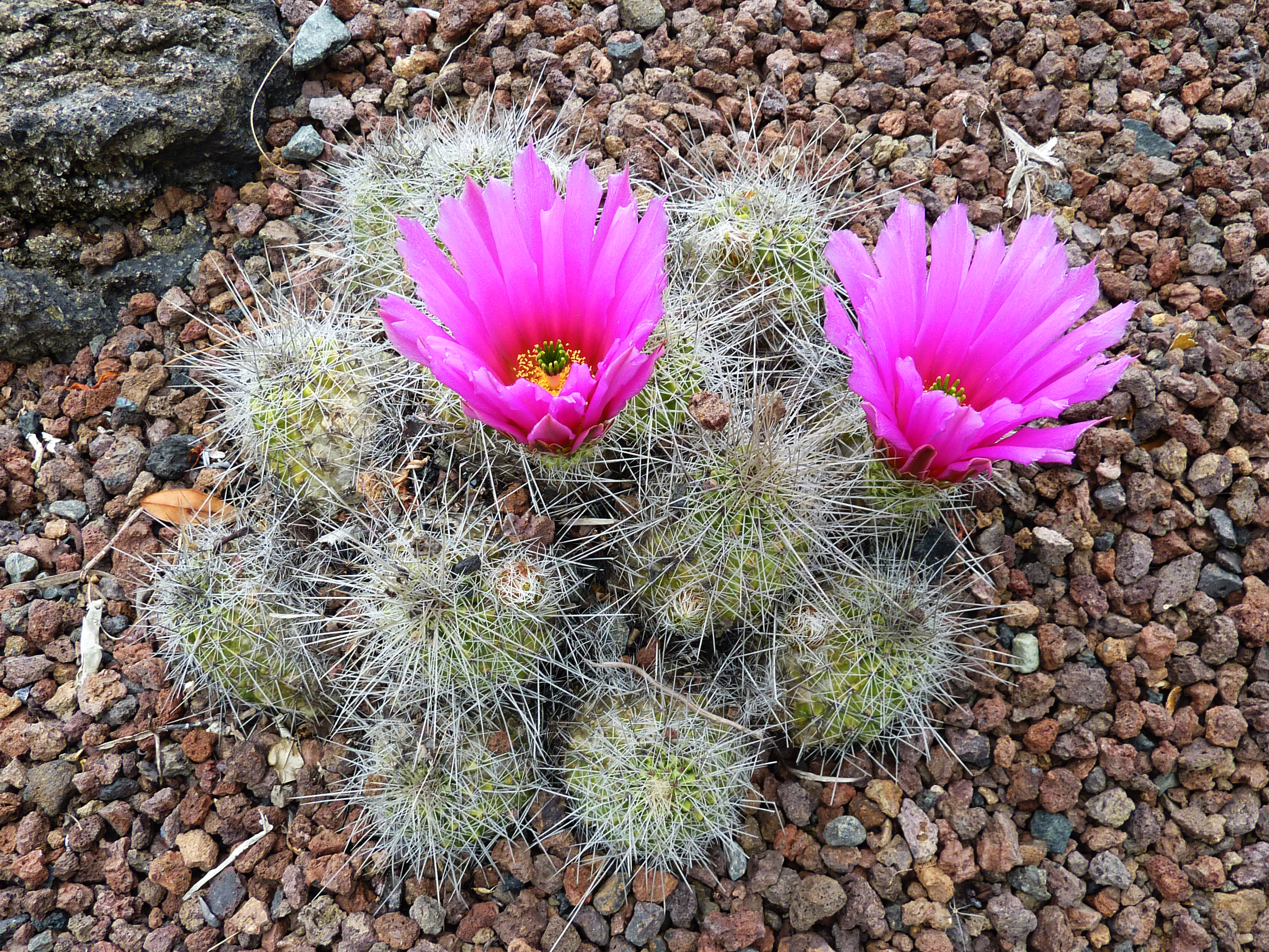
- Echinocereus stramineus
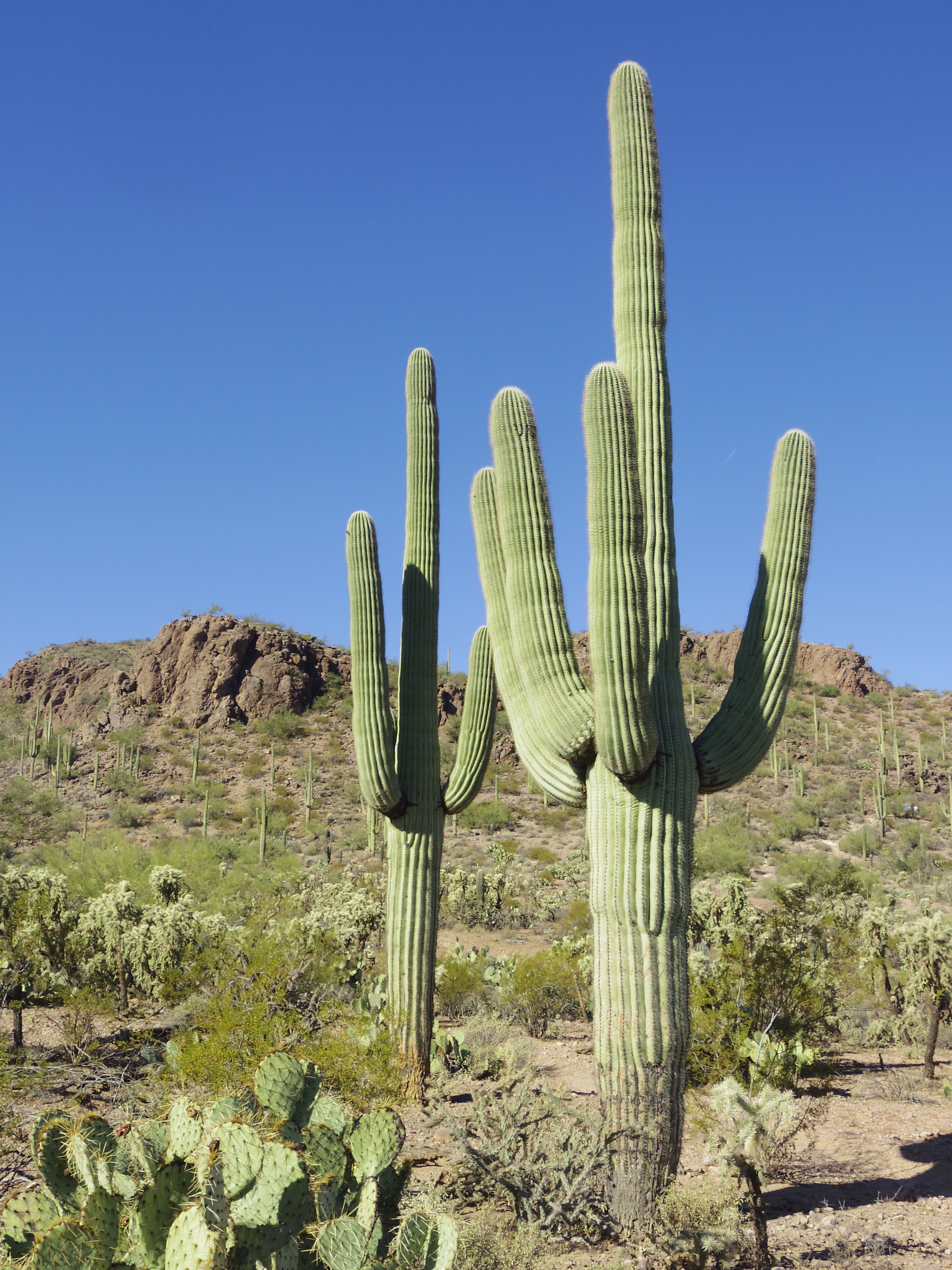
- Saguaro, Carnegiea gigantea

Scientific classification
- Kingdom: Plantae
- Clade: Tracheophytes
- Clade: Angiosperms
- Clade: Eudicots
- Order: Caryophyllales
- Family: Cactaceae
- Subfamily: Cactoideae
- Tribe: Echinocereeae; Buxbaum

Type genus
- Echinocereus

Genera
- See text.

= Echinocereeae =

Tribe of cacti

The Echinocereeae are a tribe of cacti in the subfamily Cactoideae. Since 2006, the tribe has included the former tribe Pachycereeae in many treatments of cactus classification. The exact circumscription of the tribe has been subject to considerable change, particularly since molecular phylogenetic approaches have been used in determining classifications, and remains uncertain. The tribe includes large treelike species, such as the saguaro (Carnegiea gigantea), as well as shorter shrubby species. Most members of the tribe are found in desert regions, particularly in Mexico and the southwestern United States.

== Description ==
The tribe includes large treelike species, as well as shorter shrubby species. Some species can grow to be over 15 m (50 ft) tall, like the saguaro (Carnegiea gigantea) and Cephalocereus macrocephalus (syn. Neobuxbaumia macrocephala). Their stems are ribbed and columnar, not divided into segments. Most have flowers that open at night.

== Taxonomy ==
In 1958, Franz Buxbaum published a division into tribes of what is now the subfamily Cactoideae, then Cereoideae. Two of these tribes were Pachycereeae (which he spelt "Pachycereae") and Echinocereeae (which he spelt "Echinocereae"). Pachycereeae was a newly published taxon; Echinocereeae was an elevation of the subtribe Echinocereinae ("Echinocereanae") established by Britton and Rose in 1922. Studies based on chloroplast DNA showed that Echinocereus, the type genus of the Echinocereeae, was nested within the Pachycereeae, as then circumscribed, and Pachycereeae was expanded to include Echinocereeae. In 2006, David Hunt and the International Cactaceae Systematics Group used the name Echinocereeae rather than Pachycereeae for the tribe. This has been followed in much subsequent work, including a major 2011 molecular phylogenetic analysis of the family Cactaceae. However, some authors continue to use the name Pachycereeae for the tribe.

=== Phylogeny ===
Genera placed at one time or another within the Echinocereeae (or Pachycereeae) fell within the "Core Cactoideae I" clade in the 2011 molecular phylogenetic study by Barcenas et al. Possible phylogenetic relationships within this clade are shown in the cladogram below, based on Guerrero et al. (2019) and revisions to the Hylocereeae in 2017 and 2020.

- Core Cactoideae I
  - Austrocactus, Corryocactus, Eulychnia
  - - Armatocereus, Leptocereus, Neoraimondia, Strophocactus (including Pseudoacanthocereus)
    - Core Echinocereeae
    - Hylocereeae

=== Genera ===
"Core Echinocereeae" recovered in molecular phylogenetic analyses in 2005 and 2011 contains the following genera, often only in part compared to earlier generic circumscriptions. Some genera were further placed in two subtribes, Pachycereinae and Echinocereinae. The position of some genera remained unclear, as of October 2023. Brachycereus was not included in many studies, but has been placed with Armatocereus and Jasminocereus, both included in Echinocereeae.

Image	Genus	Subtribe
	Armatocereus Backeb.	-
	Austrocactus Britton & Rose	-
	Bergerocactus Britton & Rose	Pachycereinae
	Brachycereus Britton & Rose 1920	-
	Carnegiea Britton & Rose	Pachycereinae
	Cephalocereus Pfeiff.	Pachycereinae
	Corryocactus Britton & Rose ("outside of a well-supported larger clade")	–
	Deamia Britton & Rose	Pachycereinae
	Echinocereus Engelm.	Echinocereinae
	Escontria Rose	–
	Isolatocereus Backeb.	Echinocereinae
	Jasminocereus Britton & Rose	-
	Lemaireocereus Britton & Rose	Pachycereinae
	Leptocereus (A.Berger) Britton & Rose (may be placed here or in the tribe Leptocereeae)	–
	Lophocereus Britton & Rose, when it is separated from Pachycereus	Pachycereinae
	Marginatocereus Backeb.	Pachycereinae
	Marshallocereus Backeb.	Echinocereinae
	Mitrocereus (Backeb.) Backeb.	Echinocereinae
	Morangaya G.D.Rowley	-
	Myrtillocactus Console	Echinocereinae
	Neoraimondia Britton & Rose	
	Pachycereus (A.Berger) Britton & Rose	Pachycereinae
	Peniocereus (A.Berger) Britton & Rose	Pachycereinae
	Polaskia Backeb.	Echinocereinae
	Pterocereus T.MacDoug. & Miranda	Pachycereinae
	Stenocereus (A.Berger) Riccob.	Echinocereinae
	Strophocactus Britton & Rose	–

The 2011 study found the tribe Hylocereeae to be embedded within a wider Echinocereeae, but studies in 2017 and 2020 asserted the independence of the Hylocereeae, including within it two genera placed within Pachycereeae in earlier classifications: Acanthocereus and Pseudoacanthocereus (sunk into Strophocactus).

== Natural hybrids ==
=== genera ===
Image	Scientific name	Distribution
	× Isillocactus M.H.J.van der Meer	Mexico (Hidalgo)
	× Myrtgerocactus Moran	Northwestern Mexico
	× Patrocereus M.H.J.van der Meer	Mexico (Guerrero)
	× Pacherocactus (K.Brandegee) G.D.Rowley	Mexico (Baja California)
	× Polascontria Y.Cruz & S.Vázque	Mexico (Oxaca)

== Distribution and habitat ==
Members of the Echinocereeae are native from the southwestern United States, through Mexico, Central America and the Caribbean to northern South America. Many are classic columnar desert cacti of Mexico and the southwestern US, like the saguaro (Carnegiea gigantea). A few have a wider distribution: Stenocereus griseus is found from northeastern Mexico to Colombia.
