= Austrocactus spiniflorus =

Conservation status
- Endangered (IUCN 3.1)

Scientific classification
- Kingdom: Plantae
- Clade: Tracheophytes
- Clade: Angiosperms
- Clade: Eudicots
- Order: Caryophyllales
- Family: Cactaceae
- Subfamily: Cactoideae
- Genus: Austrocactus
- Species: A. spiniflorus

Binomial name
- Austrocactus spiniflorus (Phil.) F.Ritter

Synonyms
- This species has 9 synonyms: (see text)

Species of cactus

Austrocactus spiniflorus, commonly known in Spanish as espinifloro, is a succulent flowering plant in the genus Austrocactus, within the family Cactaceae. It is endemic to central Chile, from the east of the Santiago Metropolitan Region to the northeast of the O'Higgins Region.

== Description ==
Austrocactus spiniflorus is a species of cactus with a branching and spreading growth form. Its thin cylindrical stems can grow to 20 cm in length and 2 cm in diameter. The epidermis is green to dark red in color. This species has a tuberous root (which can grow to 20 cm in length) with a well-developed neck; this root can form rhizomes.

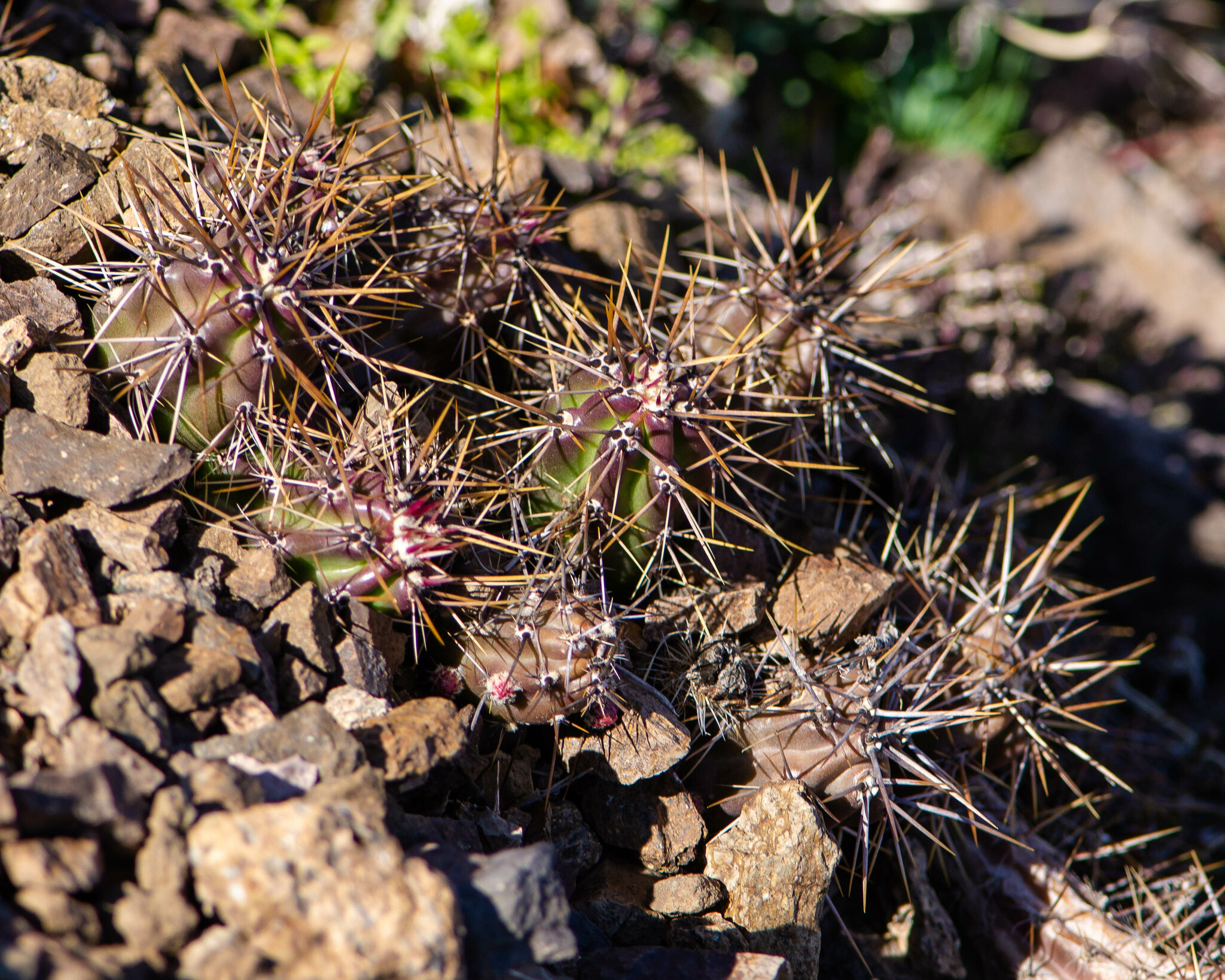
Stems and spines

The stem has 6-8 ribs, which do not have tubercles. The areoles are situated on the ribs; these are rounded and measure up to 2.5 mm in diameter. They have a white, felt-like covering and tiny deciduous leaves. This species has 1-3 central spines per areole; these point outwards. They are smooth, needle-shaped, and are bright red at the base when young. Furthermore, there are up to 8 spreading radial spines, which are also smooth and needle-shaped. The flowers are cup-shaped and grow to approximately 7 cm in length and 7.5 cm in width. The cavity of the ovary is oval in shape and measures approximately 2.5 cm in length and 1.2 cm in width. The tepals are spatulate. The internal tepals are off-white to yellowish in color; the external tepals are red. The style is white in color, and the stigma has approximately 10 light yellow lobes. The pericarpel is green, and is covered in fine reddish scales, some white woolly trichomes, and fine spines.

The fruit becomes club-shaped as it matures, and it grows to approximately 5 cm in length and 2.5 cm in width. It is yellow in color, and the surface is covered in short spines. Unlike most other Austrocactus species, the fruit of Austrocactus spiniflorus is very mucilaginous.

The seeds are black, matte, and somewhat comma-shaped. They measure approximately 3 mm in length and 2 mm in width. The hilum is small.

== Distribution and habitat ==
This species is native to central Chile, in the eastern Santiago Metropolitan Region and the northeastern O'Higgins Region.

It is found mainly in the subtropical biome at altitudes between 1200 and 1700 meters above sea level. It grows in Andean shrublands in open and sheltered areas with few rocks and moist soils into which water from snowmelt can remain for long periods of time. Although it thrives in areas with high exposure to the sun, it also requires some shade. During the winter, populations of this species can remain covered in snow for 3 to 4 months.

== Taxonomy ==
Austrocactus spiniflorus was first described as Opuntia spiniflora, a name published in 1859 by the German botanist Rodulfo Amando Philippi in the scientific journal Linnaea 30: 211.

Later, the German botanist Friedrich Ritter moved this species to the genus Austrocactus, renaming it Austrocactus spiniflorus. He registered these changes in the scientific journal Sukkulentenkunde. Jahrbücher der Schweizerischen Kakteen-Gesellschaft 7–8: 35, published in 1963.

Etymology

- Austrocactus: The genus name is derived from the Latin australis (meaning "southern"), and from cactus. This name references the southern distribution of the species in this genus: the region of Patagonia, in southern South America.
- spiniflorus: The specific epithet is Latin; it translates to "spiny flowers", in reference to the characteristic spiny flowers of this species.

Synonyms

- Cereus hypogaeus F.ACWeber ex Regel, 1882
- Corryocactus spiniflorus (Phil.) Hutchison, 1963
- Echinocereus clavatus K.Schum., 1895
- Echinocereus hypogaeus (FACWeber ex Regel) Rümpler, 1885
- Erdisia spiniflora (Phil.) Britton & Rose, 1920
- Eulychnia clavata Phil. former K. Schum., 1894
- Opuntia bicolor Phil., 1864
- Opuntia clavata Phil., 1872
- Opuntia spiniflora Phil., 1859 (basionym)

== Conservation status ==
On the IUCN Red List, Austrocactus spiniflorus is classified as being "Endangered" (EN), meaning that this species faces a high risk of extinction in the wild. This is due to its scarcity; many of its populations are made up of small groups of at most approximately 100 plants. Furthermore, this species is distributed across an area of approximately 1400 km², of which it is only present in five localities.

The primary threats faced by this species include illegal poaching, urban development, the grazing of goats, and tourist activity. These factors reduce the quality of the habitat and impact the viability of populations.

== Cultivation ==
Austrocactus spiniflorus is cultivated mainly as an ornamental. It may be propagated via seed or pups. It is uncommon in collections.

== Gallery ==
Plant in habitat in Cachapoal, O'Higgins Region, Chile

Plant size

Flower

Stem

Fruit
