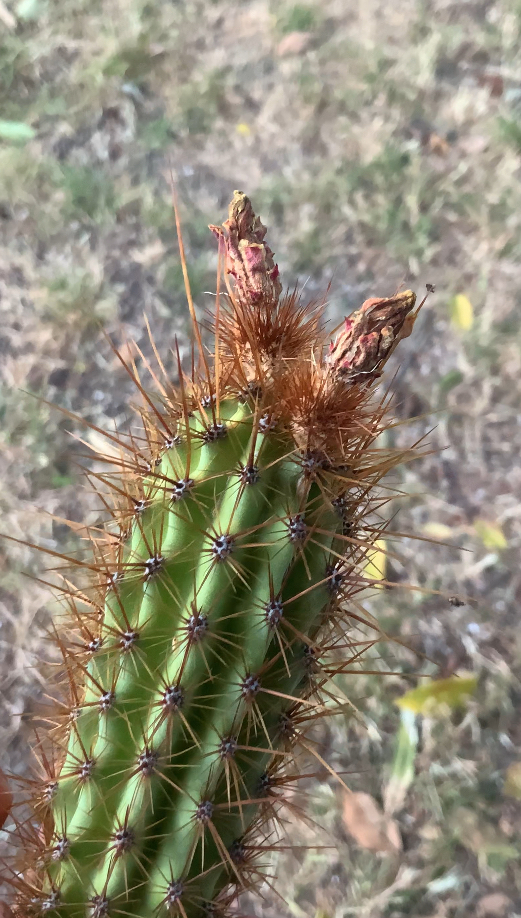

Scientific classification
- Kingdom: Plantae
- Clade: Tracheophytes
- Clade: Angiosperms
- Clade: Eudicots
- Order: Caryophyllales
- Family: Cactaceae
- Subfamily: Cactoideae
- Tribe: Echinocereeae
- Genus: × Myrtgerocactus; Moran
- Species: × M. lindsayi

Binomial name
- × Myrtgerocactus lindsayi Moran

= × Myrtgerocactus =

× Myrtgerocactus lindsayi

Hybrid genus of cacti

× Myrtgerocactus lindsayi is a species of cacti, the only one in the hybrid genus × Myrtgerocactus. It is thought to be a natural hybrid between Myrtillocactus cochal and Bergerocactus emoryi. Its generic name comes from those of its parents ("Mytillocactus" and "Bergerocactus") and its specific epithet, "lindsayi", is in honor of the botanist George Lindsay.

The cactus was first found by Lindsay near El Rosario, Baja California, Mexico, in 1950 while on a trip to look for Pacherocactus. Specimens were cultivated at the Desert Botanical Garden, finally blooming in 1961 and formally described the following year.
