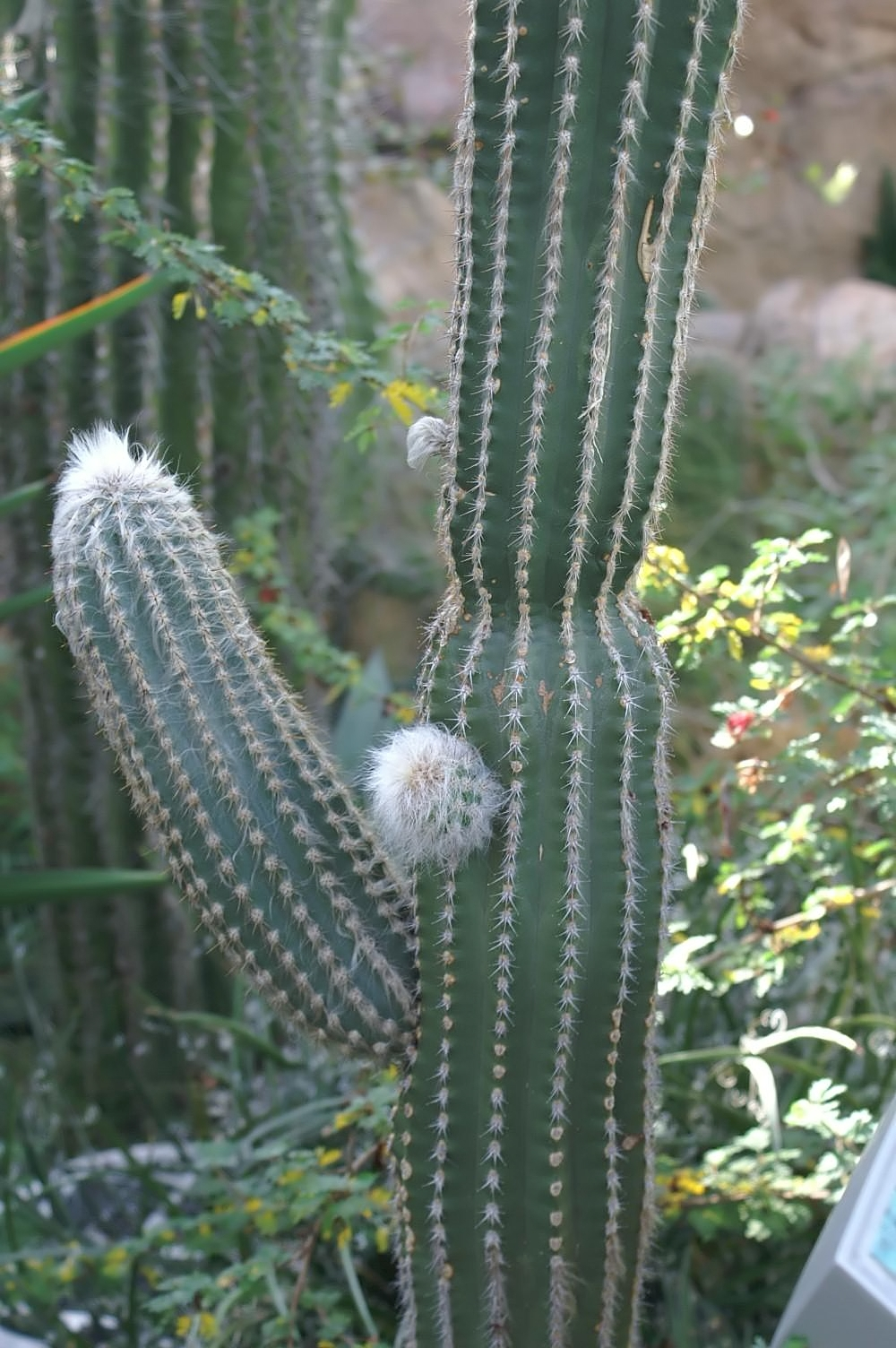

Conservation status
- Vulnerable (IUCN 3.1)

Scientific classification
- Kingdom: Plantae
- Clade: Tracheophytes
- Clade: Angiosperms
- Clade: Eudicots
- Order: Caryophyllales
- Family: Cactaceae
- Subfamily: Cactoideae
- Tribe: Echinocereeae
- Genus: Mitrocereus (Backeb.) Backeb.
- Species: M. militaris

Binomial name
- Mitrocereus militaris (Audot) Bravo

Synonyms
- List: For Mitrocereus; Backebergia Bravo For Mitrocereus militaris; Backebergia militaris (Audot) Bravo ex Sánchez-Mej. 1973; Cephalocereus militaris (Audot) H.E.Moore 1975; Cereus militaris Audot 1846; Pachycereus militaris (Audot) D.R.Hunt 1987; Backebergia chrysomallus (Lem.) Bravo 1954; Cephalocereus chrysomallus (Lem.) K.Schum. 1894; Cereus chrysomallus (Lem.) Lem. 1853; Cereus militaris var. californicus K.Schum. 1897; Mitrocereus chrysomallus (Lem.) Backeb. 1942; Pachycereus chrysomallus (Lem.) Britton & Rose 1909; Pilocereus chrysomallus Lem. 1847; Pilocereus militaris Salm-Dyck 1850

= Mitrocereus =

Genus of cacti

Mitrocereus (syn. Backebergia) is a monotypic genus of cacti. Its sole species is Mitrocereus militaris, native to Mexico.

== Description ==
Mitrocereus militaris is a tree-shaped cactus with initially single greyish-green columnar shoots that later branch out, reaching heights of 12 to 15 meters and crown diameters of up to 5 meters. The stems have 11 to 14 ribs with areoles close together, covered with short wool and white woolly hairs. Areoles typically have 3 to 4 protruding, yellowish to brownish central spines over 10 cm (3.9 in) long, and 10 to 12 radial spines that are flexible, bristle-like, and 1.5 to 4 cm (0.59 to 1.57 in) long. At the tips of the shoots, a cap-shaped pseudocephalium made of yellowish-brown wool develops, which can be up to 30 cm (12 in) long with a diameter of up to 20 cm (7.9 in).

The flowers, which open at night, appear laterally from the pseudocephalium. They are reddish to cream-colored, 5 cm (2.0 in) long, and reach a diameter of 3.5 to 4 cm (1.4 to 1.6 in). The pericarpel and flower tube are covered with small scales, tufts of wool, and bristles. The elongated fruits are fleshy and become dry when ripe, covered with scales, bristles, and long tufts of woolly hair.

== Natural Hybrids ==
The distribution of this plant overlaps with that of Pachycereus pecten-aboriginum and the natural hybrid × Patrocereus has been found in Guerrero.

== Distribution ==
Mitrocereus militaris is distributed in the Mexican states of Guerrero, Jalisco, Michoacán, and Colima at elevations of 100 to 600 meters.

== Taxonomy ==
The plant, first described as Cereus militaris in 1845 by N. Audot, derives its specific epithet militaris from Latin, meaning military or army, referring to the terminal pseudocephalium resembling a soldier's cap. David Richard Hunt placed the species in the genus Pachycereus in 1987. It is commonly known as Golden Fleece, Military Cap, and Teddy-Bear Cactus.
