= Austrocactus bertinii =

Conservation status
- Least Concern (IUCN 3.1)

Scientific classification
- Kingdom: Plantae
- Clade: Tracheophytes
- Clade: Angiosperms
- Clade: Eudicots
- Order: Caryophyllales
- Family: Cactaceae
- Subfamily: Cactoideae
- Genus: Austrocactus
- Species: A. bertinii

Binomial name
- Austrocactus bertinii (J.F.Cels) Britton & Rose, 1922

Synonyms
- This species has 12 synonyms: (see text)

Species of plant

Austrocactus bertinii is a species of succulent flowering plant in the genus Austrocactus, within the family Cactaceae. It is native to southern Chile and central and southern Argentina.

== Description ==
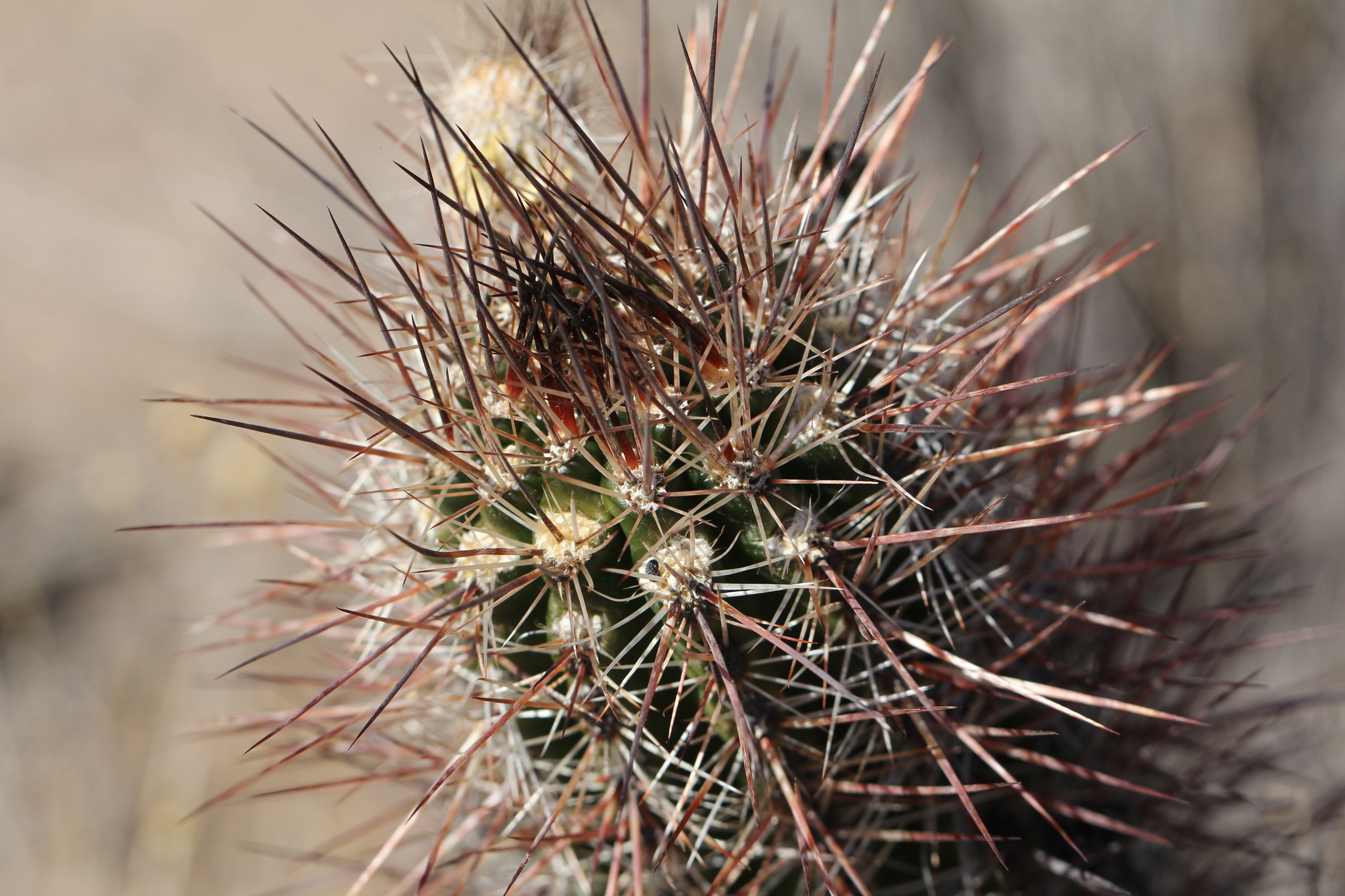
Apical meristem and spines of Austrocactus bertinii

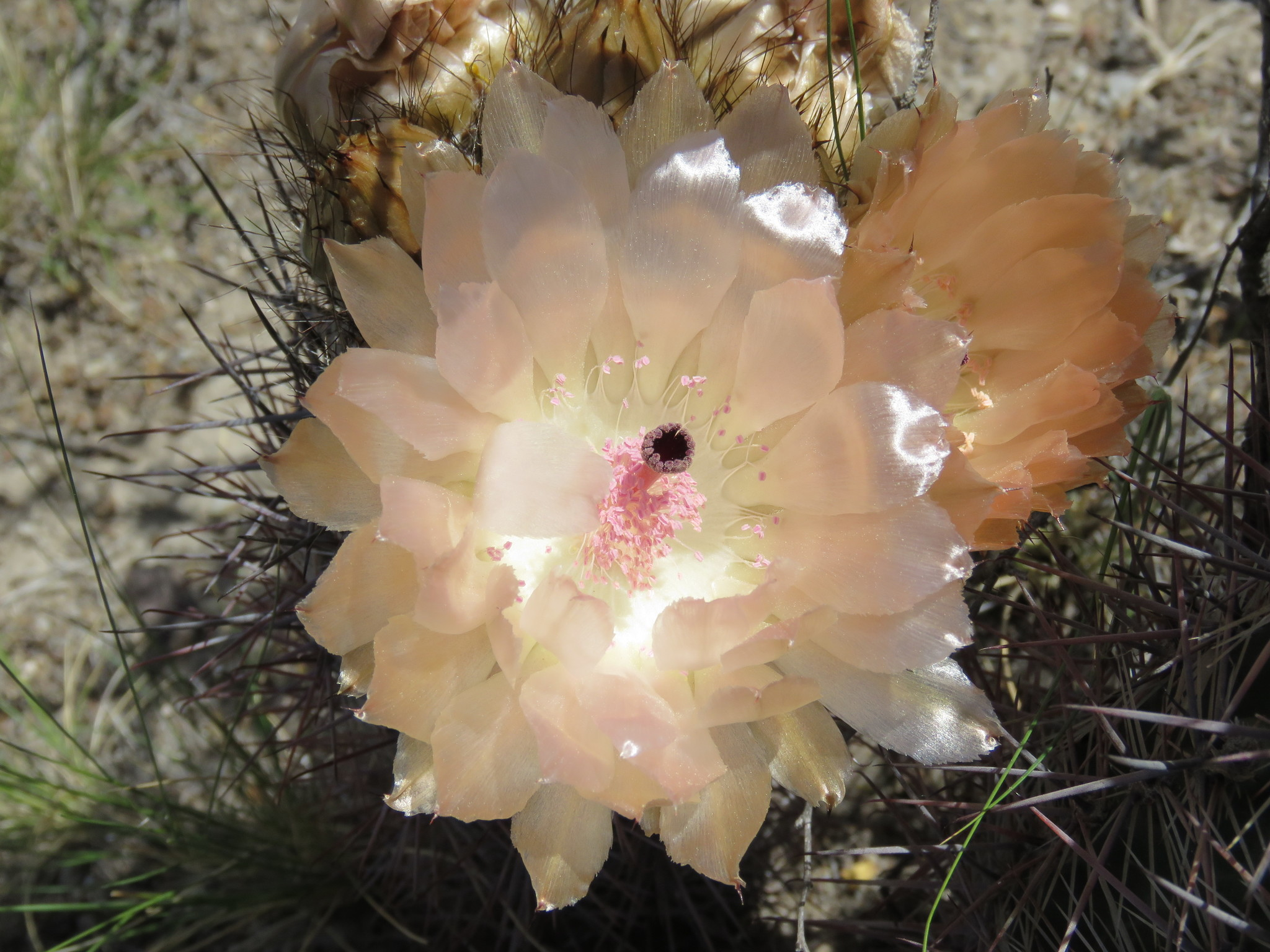
Flower of Austrocactus bertinii

Austrocactus bertinii is a species of cactus that normally grows solitarily. Its growth habit is erect, and it has a club-shaped to columnar stem that grows to 40-80 cm tall and 10 cm in diameter. The epidermis is dark green in color. The stem has 10-12 ribs, which are divided into inconspicuous tubercles, on which are situated the oval-shaped areoles. The areoles are approximately 3 mm long and 6 mm wide.

The new growth is covered in short, cream-colored woolly trichomes. This species develops 4 central spines per areole: one pointing outwards from the stem, one pointing upwards, and two pointing sideways. These spines are strong, more or less straight, awl-shaped, and have mostly pubescent surfaces. Furthermore, the areoles possess 15 radial spines; these are slightly pubescent, needle-shaped, and radiate outwards from the areole. The flowers are infundibuliform to campanulate in shape, and grow up to 5.5 cm long and 4.5 cm in diameter.

The cavity of the ovary is obovoid in shape, and is approximately 6 mm long and 9 mm wide. The tepals are broadly lanceolate, with well-defined apices and slightly-scalloped margins. The tepal color varies from cream-colored at the bases to pink or flesh-colored at the apices, with an outer-central stripe that is pinkish-brown. The coloration of the style can vary from light pink to magenta, while the stigma possesses 12-14 dark purple lobes. The pericarpel is dark olive green in color, with a small amount of wool and long, smooth bristles on the margin.

The fruit is barrel-shaped and grows to approximately 1.3 cm long and 1.4 cm in diameter. Its color varies from dark green to eggplant purple. Its surface is sparsely covered with wool and sharp bristles. As it matures, it dries out and splits irregularly from the base.

The seeds are comma-shaped and dark gray-brown in color. They are approximately 2 mm in diameter and 1 mm thick.

== Distribution and habitat ==
Austrocactus bertinii has a native distribution that extends from the province of Aysén in southern Chile to Argentina. In Argentina, it is found mainly along the Atlantic coast of northern Santa Cruz province, as well as in the provinces of Chubut and Río Negro. It is also found in areas around the Río Negro, Colorado, Neuquén, and Grande rivers in the provinces of Río Negro, La Pampa, Neuquén, and Mendoza.

It mainly inhabits the temperate biome, from sea level to 1000 meters in elevation. It is found in cold environments, where it usually grows protected under shrubs and other plant cover with reduced solar exposure.

== Taxonomy ==
Austrocactus bertinii was first described as Cereus bertinii, a name published in 1860 by the botanist Jean François Cels in the scientific journal Horticulteur Français; journal des amateurs et des intérêts horticoles 1863: 251.

Later, American botanists Nathaniel Lord Britton and Joseph Nelson Rose transferred the species to the genus Austrocactus and renamed it Austrocactus bertinii. They registered these changes in their book The Cactaceae; descriptions and illustrations of plants of the cactus family 3: 44–45, f. 56, published in 1922.

Etymology

- Austrocactus: The genus name is derived from the Latin australis (meaning "southern"), and from cactus. This name references the southern distribution of the species in this genus: the region of Patagonia, in southern South America.
- bertinii: The specific epithet honors Pierre Bertin (1800-1891), who collected specimens of this species in Patagonia.

Synonyms

- Austrocactus dusenii (F.A.C.Weber ex Speg.) Speg., 1923
- Austrocactus patagonicus (F.A.C.Weber ex Speg.) Hosseus, 1926
- Cereus bertinii J.F.Cels, 1863 (basionym)
- Cereus dusenii F.A.C.Weber ex Speg., 1899
- Cereus patagonicus F.A.C.Weber ex Speg., 1897
- Echinocactus bertinii (J.F.Cels) A.Berger, 1929
- Echinocereus bertinii (J.F.Cels) Walton, 1898
- Malacocarpus bertinii (J.F.Cels) Hosseus, 1939
- Malacocarpus dusenii Hosseus, 1939
- Malacocarpus patagonicus (F.A.C.Weber ex Speg.) Britton & Rose, 1922
- Notocactus bertinii (J.F.Cels) W.T.Marshall, 1941
- Notocactus patagonicus (F.A.C.Weber ex Speg.) W.T.Marshall, 1941

== Conservation status ==
On the IUCN Red List, Austrocactus bertinii is classified as "Least Concern", meaning that it is currently at low risk of extinction. It is classified as such due to its wide distribution and its abundance in much of its range.

Within much of its range, this species may benefit from habitat modifications associated with livestock grazing. However, in the part of Chile where it is found, it faces local threats related to the expansion of cherry cultivation and the growth of urban areas.

== Cultivation ==
Austrocactus bertinii is cultivated as an ornamental plant for its cold-hardiness and attractiveness. Its cultivation is relatively simple, provided that it is kept dry in autumn and winter. It can tolerate temperatures down to -18 ºC (-0.4 ºF) in dry conditions, and in fact often requires a cold period in the winter for optimum growth and flowering in cultivation.

It grows best in full sun and in well-drained mineral substrates. During its growing season, it requires regular irrigation, but the substrate should be allowed to dry out completely between waterings. In winter, it should be kept dry; even excessive humidity can cause its roots to rot. When fertilizing, it is recommended to use low-nitrogen fertilizers with higher proportions of phosphorus and potassium during the growing season.

When the plant's roots occupy the entire container, transplanting is best done in spring. The substrate should be changed every other year. Due to the sensitivity of the roots, this species is sometimes grafted to enhance its resistance to rot and to eliminate root-related issues.

Austrocactus bertinii may be propagated via seed or pups. Pups may be separated from their parent plant in spring or summer; they then require a dry period to form callus prior to being planted. The seeds germinate best in spring, in aerated substrates and at temperatures of approximately 22-24 ºC (71.6-75.2 ºF).

== Gallery ==
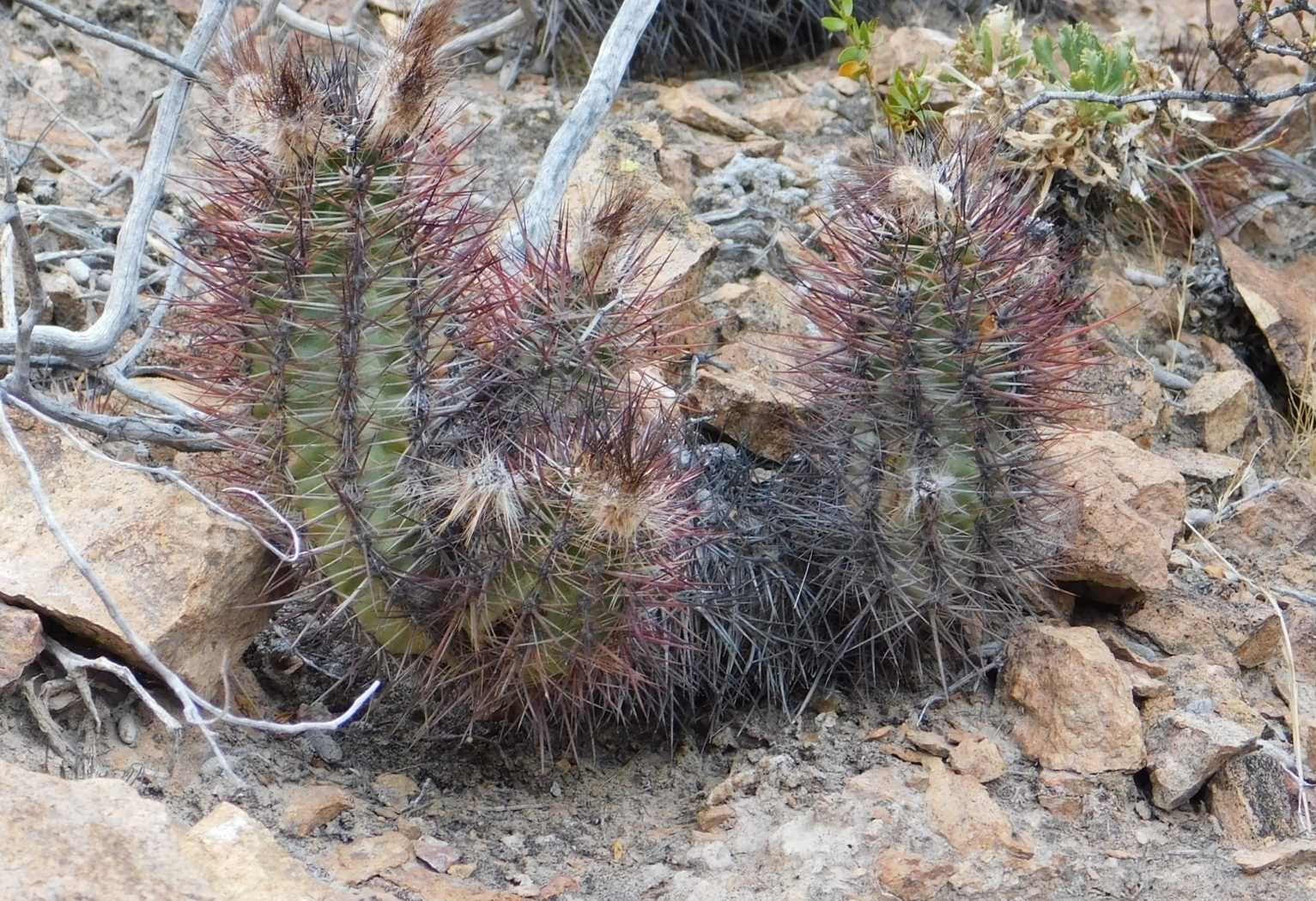
Plant in habitat in Chubut, Argentina

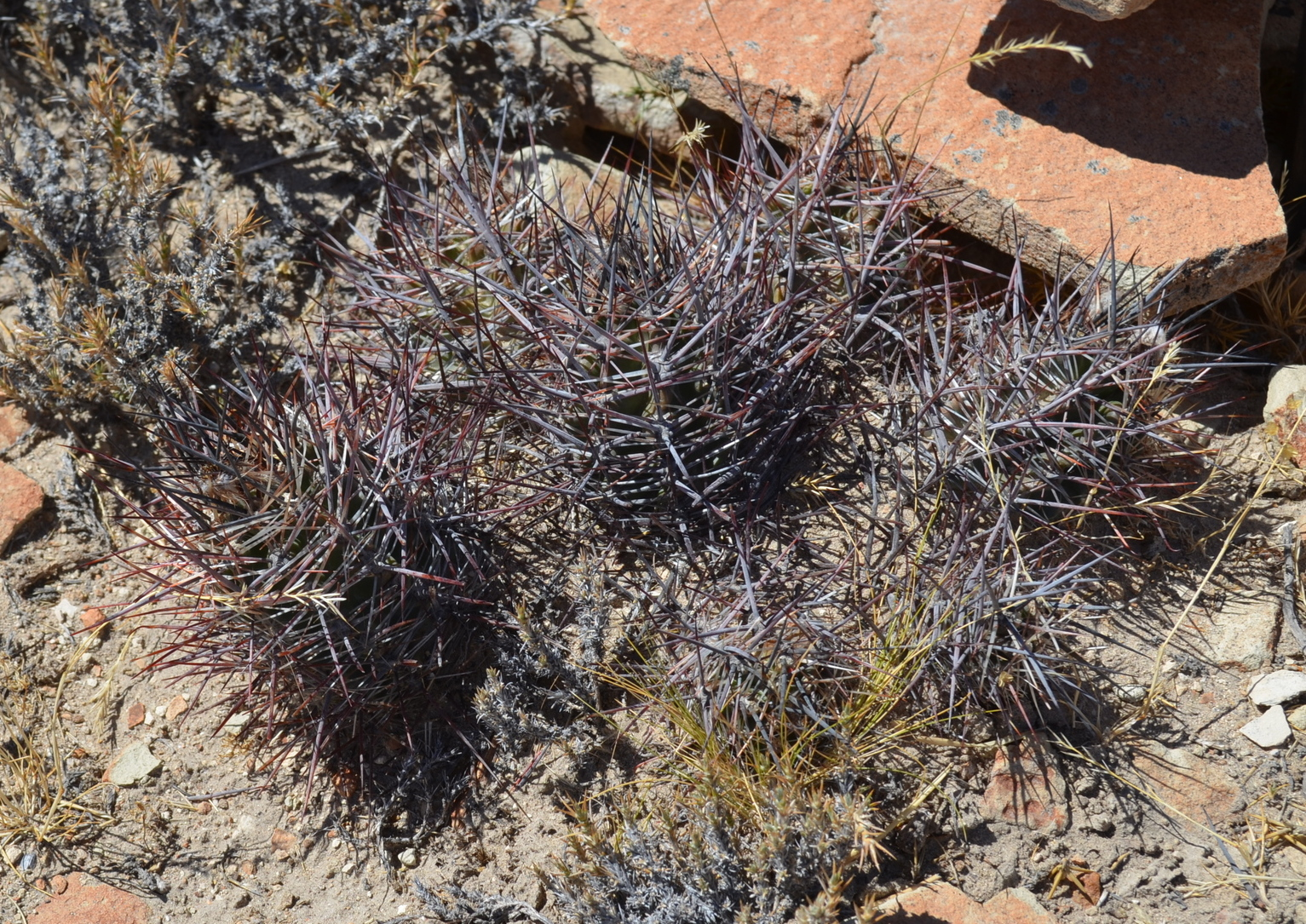
Plant in Santa Cruz Province, Argentina

Spines

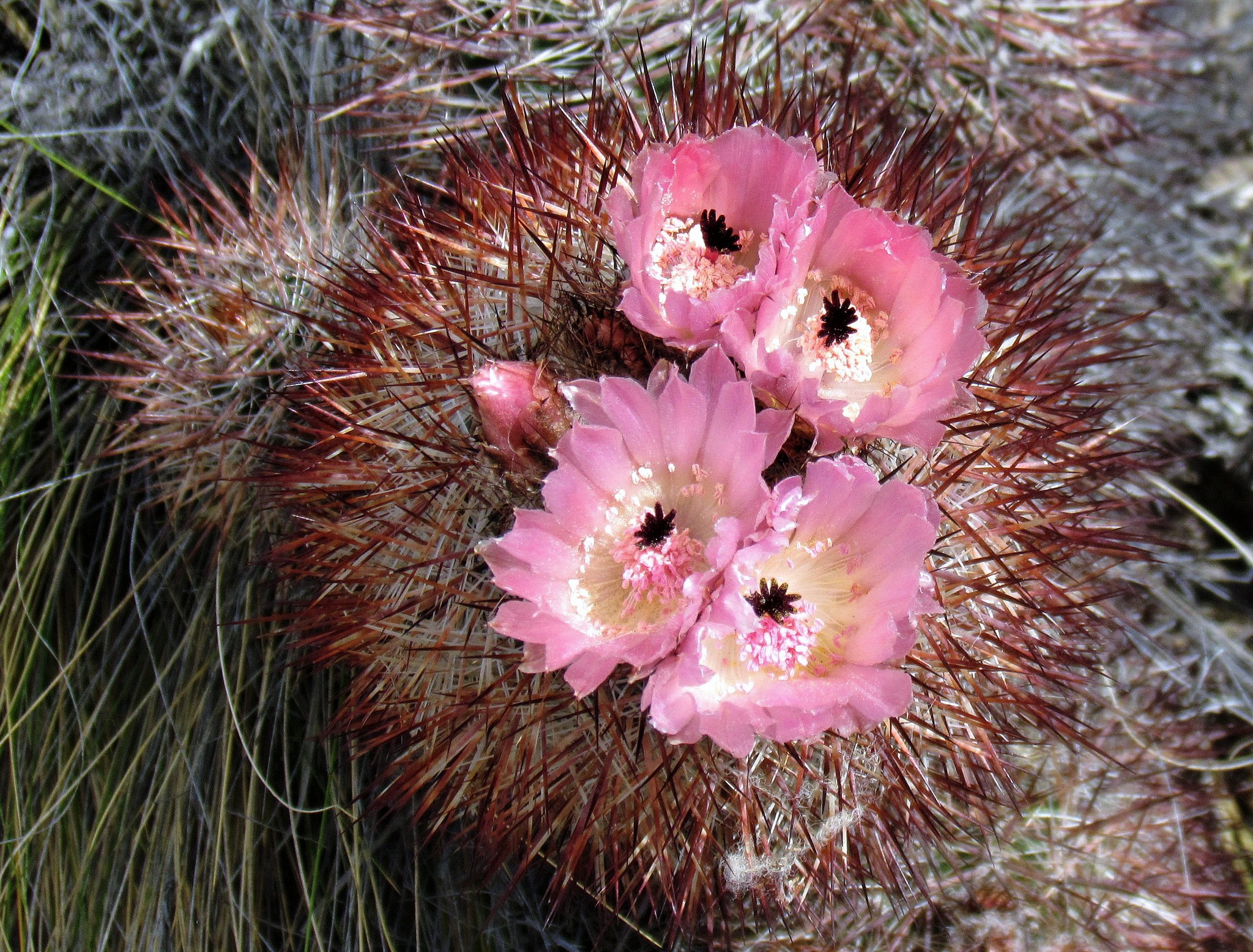
Plant in flower

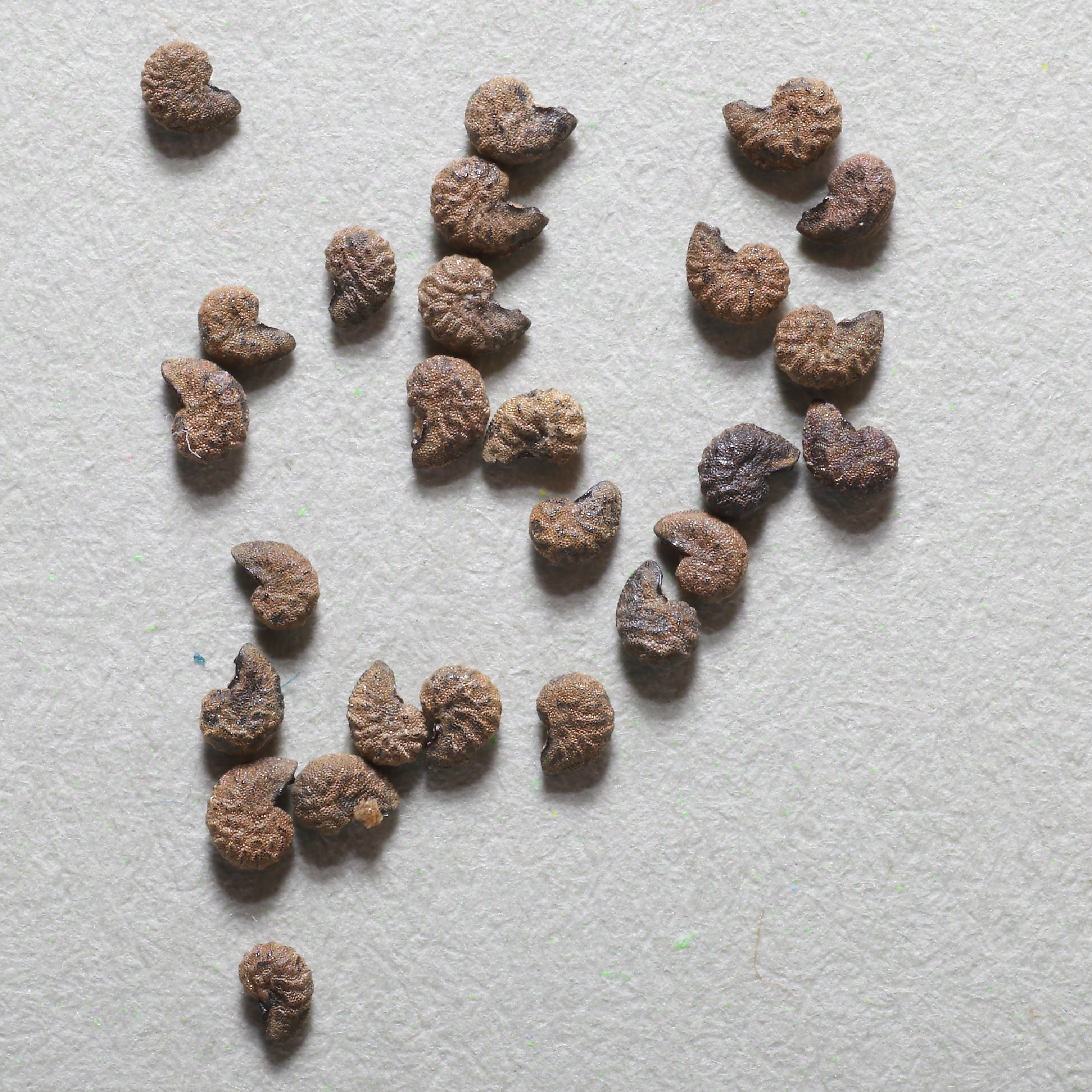
Seeds
