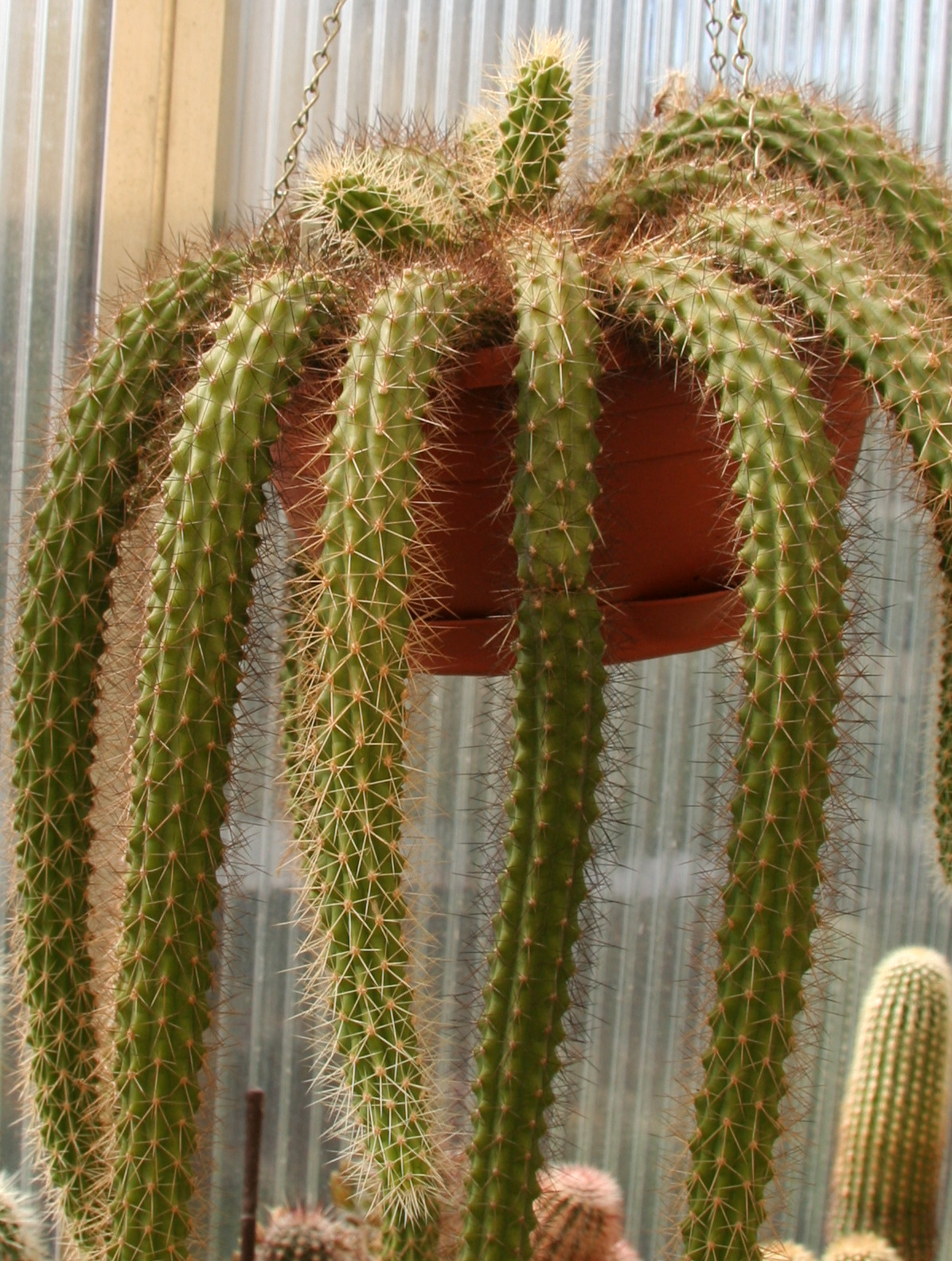
- Echinocereus pensilis (synonym of Morangaya pensilis)

Conservation status
- Least Concern (IUCN 3.1)

Scientific classification
- Kingdom: Plantae
- Clade: Tracheophytes
- Clade: Angiosperms
- Clade: Eudicots
- Order: Caryophyllales
- Family: Cactaceae
- Subfamily: Cactoideae
- Tribe: Echinocereeae
- Genus: Morangaya; G.D.Rowley
- Species: M. pensilis

Binomial name
- Morangaya pensilis (K.Brandegee) G.D.Rowley

Synonyms
- Cereus pensilis K.Brandegee; Echinocereus pensilis (K.Brandegee) J.A.Purpus

= Morangaya =

Genus of cylindrical cacti

Morangaya is a monotypic genus of ribbed, usually small to medium-sized, cylindrical shaped cacti, that is native to north western Mexico. The only species is Morangaya pensilis. It is found in the mountains and rocky hills.

== Description ==
It has a mostly clumping form with basally branching vine-like stems. That are at first erect, but then become arching and prostrate or hanging, usually with aerial roots. The stems are cylindrical and taper toward the tips, up to 2 m (6 ft 7 in) long or more, 2.5–4 cm (1–2 in) in diameter. It has 8 - 10 ribs which are low, rounded and tuberculate (small tuber-like). The areoles are 1–2 cm (0–1 in) spaced apart. The needle-like spines are yellow that turn reddish as they age. It has 1 central spine, 1–2.5 cm (0–1 in) long, with 6 to 10 radials more or less radiating, on young areoles. When the plants are older, they can have up 70 or more radials. The flowers which bloom between April and May, are orange or reddish at the stem tip or on older parts, 5–7 cm (2–3 in) long and 4–5 cm (2–2 in) in diameter. They are tubular to narrowly funnelform in shape. The areoles of the tube and ovary, have white or yellowish wool and chestnut bristly/silky spines. After flowering, it produces a fruits (or seed capsule), which is globose to elongate in shape, spiny, red with red pulp 1.5–2 cm (1–1 in) in diameter. Inside, it contains black and rugose seeds, which are very oblique at base.

== Taxonomy ==
It has the common names of 'snake cactus' and 'pitayita hanging cactus'.

The genus name of Morangaya is in honour of Reid Venable Moran (1916–2010), an American botanist, Edward G. Gay (1916–1997) and Betty Gay (1919–2013) who were experts on the flora of Baja California.

The genus and the species of Morangaya pensilis (K.Brandegee) G.D.Rowley were circumscribed by Gordon Douglas Rowley in Ashingtonia vol.1 on page 44 in 1974.

The name Echinocereus pensilis was first published in Monatsschr. Kakteenk. 18: 5 in 1908 by J.A.Purpus. Morangaya pensilis then became a synonym of the older name. Until it was re-established as a separate species with its own genus, Morangaya. Due to molecular phylogenetic studies in 2015. Also anatomical evidence supported this moment.

Although, it is still named as Echinocereus pensilis in some sources.

== Conservation ==
The species suffers from various damages to its native habit, including fragmentation, illegal collection and trade, and also land use changes, especially to farming and cattle ranching, which have impacts on the habitats. Therefore, it passes the requirements for categorization as Vulnerable on the IUCN Red List.
