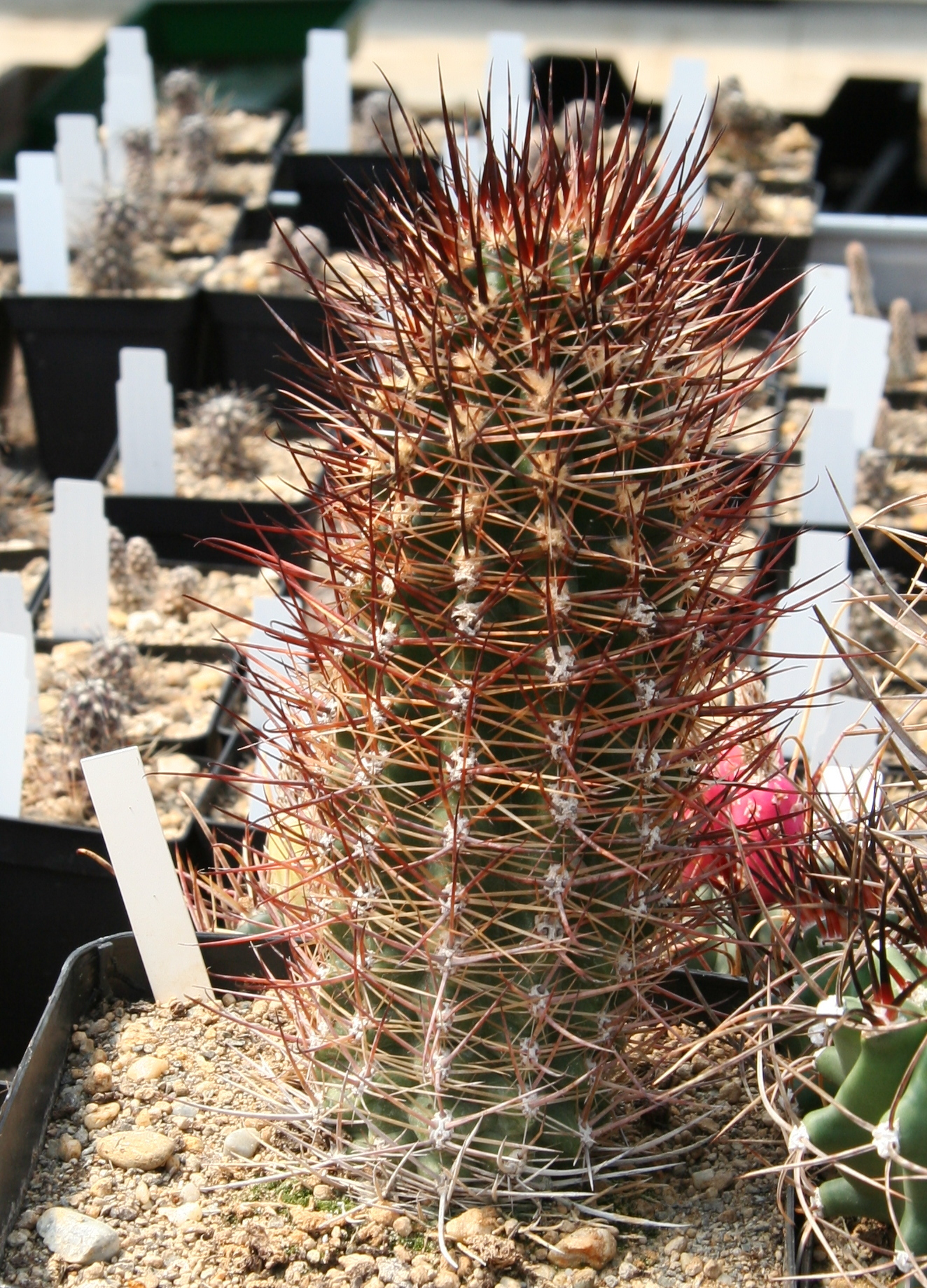

Scientific classification
- Kingdom: Plantae
- Clade: Tracheophytes
- Clade: Angiosperms
- Clade: Eudicots
- Order: Caryophyllales
- Family: Cactaceae
- Subfamily: Cactoideae
- Tribe: Echinocereeae
- Genus: Austrocactus; Britton & Rose

Species
- See text.

= Austrocactus =

Species of cactus

Austrocactus is a genus of cacti with ten species endemic to Argentina and Chile.

They have solitary or branched bodies, and the ribs are usually divided into tubercules (except Austrocactus spiniflorus). The tallest species in this genus is 80 centimeters. Flowers are pink, orange, red, or yellow with a characteristic spiny tube.

== Species ==
As of September 2026, Plants of the World Online accepted the following species:

Image	Scientific Name	Distribution
	Austrocactus aonikenkensis E.Sarnes & N.Sarnes	Argentina (Santa Cruz)
	Austrocactus bertinii (J.F.Cels) Britton & Rose	S Chile to N Central and S Argentina
	Austrocactus coxii (K.Schum.) Backeb.	S Argentina
	Austrocactus decorus E.Sarnes & N.Sarnes	Argentina (Neuquén)
	Austrocactus diamantinus E.Sarnes & N.Sarnes	Argentina (Mendoza)
	Austrocactus elegans Böhnert	Chile (Maule) to Argentina (Mendoza and Neuquén)
	Austrocactus ferrarii R.Kiesling, E.Sarnes & N.Sarnes	Argentina (Mendoza)
	Austrocactus hibernus F.Ritter	C Chile
	Austrocactus implexus E.Sarnes & N.Sarnes	Argentina (Chubut)
	Austrocactus nobilis E.Sarnes & N.Sarnes	Argentina (Rio Negro)
	Austrocactus occidentalis Merkl.	Argentina (Chubut)
	Austrocactus pauxillus E.Sarnes & N.Sarnes	Argentina (Mendoza)
	Austrocactus philippii (Regel & Schmidt) Buxb.	C Chile to Argentina (Mendoza)
	Austrocactus praecox E.Sarnes & N.Sarnes	Argentina (Mendoza)
	Austrocactus spiniflorus (Phil.) F.Ritter	C Chile
	Austrocactus subandinus E.Sarnes & N.Sarnes	NW Argentina

== Key to Identification ==
Ribs divided into tubercles:

- stems upright
  - large stems (>25 cm)
    - Austrocactus bertinii
    - Austrocactus dusenii – synonym of Austrocactus bertinii
    - Austrocactus intertextus sensu Speg. – synonym of Austrocactus coxii
    - Austrocactus patagonicus – synonym of Austrocactus bertinii
  - smaller stems (<25 cm)
    - Austrocactus ferrarii
    - Austrocactus longicarpus – synonym of Austrocactus coxii ssp. longicarpus
    - Austrocactus philippii
- stems prostrate
  - stems with adventitious roots
    - Austrocactus colloncurensis – synonym of Austrocactus coxii ssp. colloncurensis
    - Austrocactus coxii
    - Austrocactus gracilis – synonym of Austrocactus coxii
    - Austrocactus hibernus
  - stems without adventitious roots
    - Austrocactus subandinus

Ribs smooth:

- Austrocactus spiniflorus
