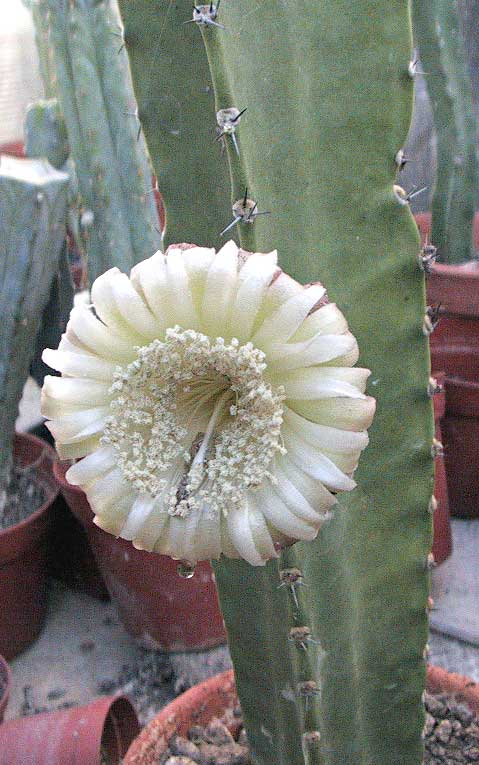

Conservation status
- Endangered (IUCN 2.3)

Scientific classification
- Kingdom: Plantae
- Clade: Tracheophytes
- Clade: Angiosperms
- Clade: Eudicots
- Order: Caryophyllales
- Family: Cactaceae
- Subfamily: Cactoideae
- Tribe: Echinocereeae
- Genus: Pterocereus; T.MacDoug. & Miranda
- Species: P. gaumeri

Binomial name
- Pterocereus gaumeri (Britton & Rose) T.MacDoug. & Miranda

Synonyms
- Anisocereus gaumeri (Britton & Rose) Backeb. 1960; Cereus yucatanensis Standl. 1930; Pachycereus gaumeri Britton & Rose 1920

= Pterocereus =

Genus of cacti

Pterocereus is a monotypic genus of cactus containing the sole species Pterocereus gaumeri.

== Description ==
Pterocereus gaumeri grows tree-shaped with long, slender shoots, has little or no branches and reaches heights of up to 8 meters. It forms a trunk up to 1.5 meters high. The three to four very sharp-edged ribs look wing-like. The areoles on it are far apart from each other. The approximately ten thorns are gray or reddish black and up to 5 cm (2.0 in) long.

The cylindrical to funnel-shaped, greenish white flowers exude a foul-smelling scent. They open at night and are 8.5 to 9.5 cm (3.3 to 3.7 in) long. Its pericarpel and floral tube are covered with fleshy, leaf-like scales that have recurved tips, as well as some wool and a few bristles. The spherical fruits are light red.

=== Subspecies ===
There are two recognized subspecies:

Image	Scientific name	Distribution
	Pterocereus gaumeri subsp. foetidus (T.MacDoug. & Miranda) S.Arias & Terrazas	Mexico (Chiapas)
	Pterocereus gaumeri subsp. gaumeri	Mexico (Veracruz, Quintana Roo, Yucatan)

== Distribution ==
Pterocereus gaumeri is distributed in the Mexican states of Yucatán, Chiapas and Veracruz.

== Phytochemistry ==
contains the tetrahydroisoquinoline glycoalkaloid pterocereine, and its aglycone analogue, deglucopterocereine and deglucopterocereine-N-oxide.

== Taxonomy ==
The first description was made in 1920 by Nathaniel Lord Britton and Joseph Nelson Rose. The specific epithet gaumeri honors the American botanist and naturalist George Franklin Gaumer (1850–1929), who discovered the species. Nomenclature synonyms are Anisocereus gaumeri (Britton & Rose) Backeb. (1942) and Pachycereus gaumeri Britton & Rose (1920). Taxonomic synonyms are Cereus yucatanensis Standl. (1930), Pterocereus foetidus T. MacDoug. & Miranda (1954), Anisocereus foetidus (T.MacDoug. & Miranda) W.T.Marshall (1957), Pachycereus foetidus (T.MacDoug. & Miranda) P.V.Heath (1992).
