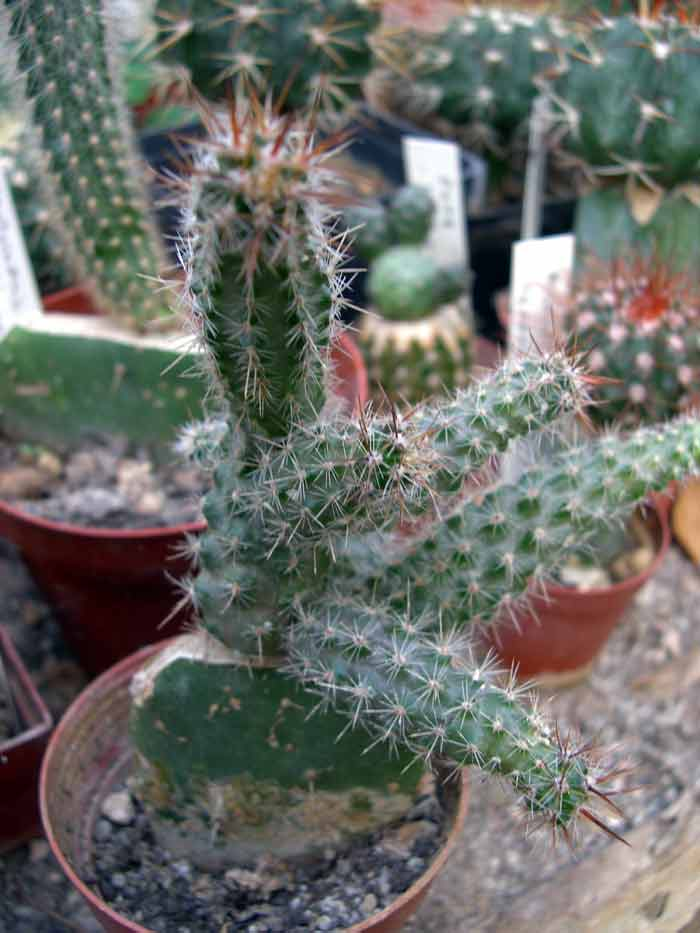
- Specimen growing grafted on Opuntia

Scientific classification
- Kingdom: Plantae
- Clade: Tracheophytes
- Clade: Angiosperms
- Clade: Eudicots
- Order: Caryophyllales
- Family: Cactaceae
- Subfamily: Cactoideae
- Genus: Austrocactus
- Species: A. coxii

Binomial name
- Austrocactus coxii (K.Schum.) Backeb.

= Austrocactus coxii =

Species of cactus

Austrocactus coxii is a plant species in the genus Austrocactus from the cactus family (Cactaceae), indigenous to southern Argentina and southern Chile. It grows as short columnar stems up to 5 cm diameter, reaching 60 cm in height, with 6-10 tuberculate ribs. Central spines are hard, straight or slightly hooked, light brown to whitish and up to 4 cm long. Thin spines are interwoven and range from 6 to 10 in number; each is up to 1 cm long. Its diurnal red flowers are up to 3.5 cm in diameter.

== Synonyms ==
- Austrocactus intertextus
- Echinocactus coxii
- Echinocactus intertextus
- Malacocarpus coxii
- Malacocarpus intertextus
