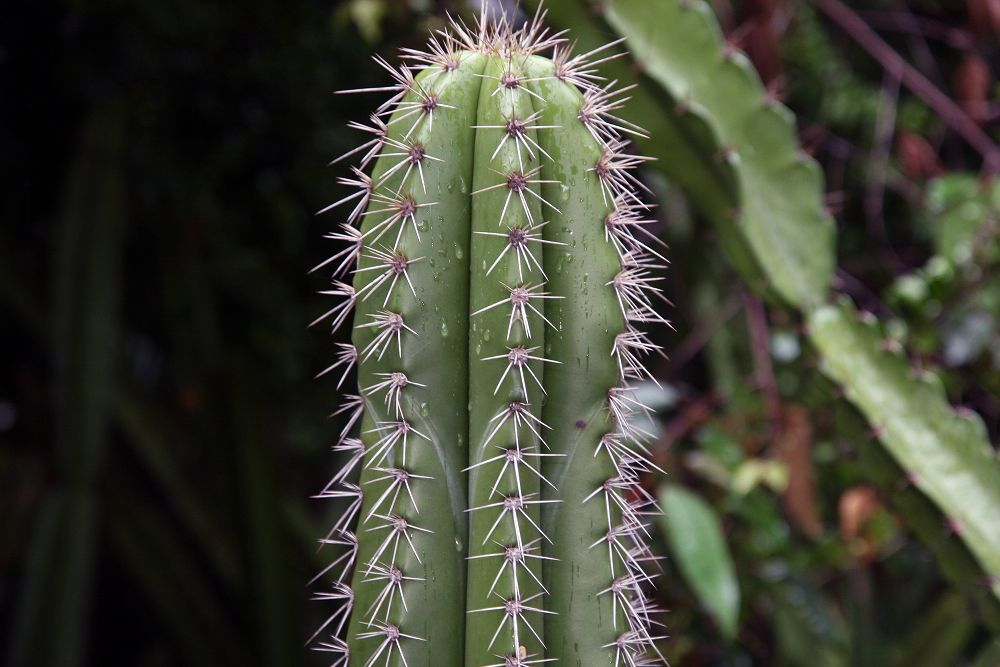

Conservation status
- Least Concern (IUCN 3.1)

Scientific classification
- Kingdom: Plantae
- Clade: Tracheophytes
- Clade: Angiosperms
- Clade: Eudicots
- Order: Caryophyllales
- Family: Cactaceae
- Subfamily: Cactoideae
- Tribe: Echinocereeae
- Genus: Marshallocereus; Backeb. 1950
- Species: M. aragonii

Binomial name
- Marshallocereus aragonii (F.A.C.Weber) Backeb. 1951

Synonyms
- Cereus aragonii F.A.C.Weber 1902; Lemaireocereus aragonii (F.A.C.Weber) Britton & Rose 1920; Neolemaireocereus aragonii (F.A.C.Weber) Backeb. 1944; Pachycereus aragonii (F.A.C.Weber) P.V.Heath 1992; Stenocereus aragonii (F.A.C.Weber) Buxb. 1961; Cereus aragonii var. palmatus F.A.C.Weber 1902; Cereus eichlamii (Britton & Rose) Standl. 1940; Cereus laevigatus var. guatemalensis Eichlam 1912; Cereus yunckeri Standl. 1940; Lemaireocereus eichlamii Britton & Rose 1920; Lemaireocereus laevigatus var. guatemalensis (Eichlam) Borg 1951; Lemaireocereus longispinus Britton & Rose 1920; Marshallocereus aragonii subsp. eichlamii (Britton & Rose) Guiggi 2012; Pachycereus aragonii var. palmatus (F.A.C.Weber) P.V.Heath 1992; Pachycereus eichlamii (Britton & Rose) D.R.Hunt 2013; Rathbunia eichlamii (Britton & Rose) P.V.Heath 1992; Rathbunia longispinus (Britton & Rose) P.V.Heath 1992; Rathbunia yunckeri (Standl.) P.V.Heath 1992; Ritterocereus eichlamii (Britton & Rose) Backeb. 1951; Stenocereus eichlamii (Britton & Rose) Buxb. 1978; Stenocereus longispinus (Britton & Rose) Buxb. 1961; Stenocereus yunckeri (Standl.) M.Bravo & Sánchez-Mej. 1983

= Marshallocereus =

Species of cactus

Marshallocereus is a monotypic genus of flowering plant in the family Cactaceae. The only species is Marshallocereus aragonii that is found in Costa Rica, El Salvador, Guatemala, Honduras, Mexico, and Nicaragua.

== Description ==
Marshallocereus aragonii is a columnar cactus with dark green shoots that grow up to 5–6 meters tall (rarely exceeding 6 meters) and 12–15 centimeters in diameter. It branches minimally from the base and typically lacks a distinct trunk. The shoots often display a diagonal, light band pattern marking the end of annual growth. The plant features 5–8 rounded ribs, 2–3 cm high, with 1–3 gray central spines (2–3 cm long) and 5–9 shorter marginal spines (up to 2 cm long). The funnel-shaped flowers bloom at night, measuring 6–8 cm in length. They have greenish-brown outer bracts, white inner bracts, and a tubercled, thorn-covered pericarpel.

== Distribution ==
This species is native to northwestern Costa Rica, El Salvador, Guatemala, Honduras, Mexico (Chiapas), and Nicaragua growing in dry forests at elevations from 50 to 800 meters.

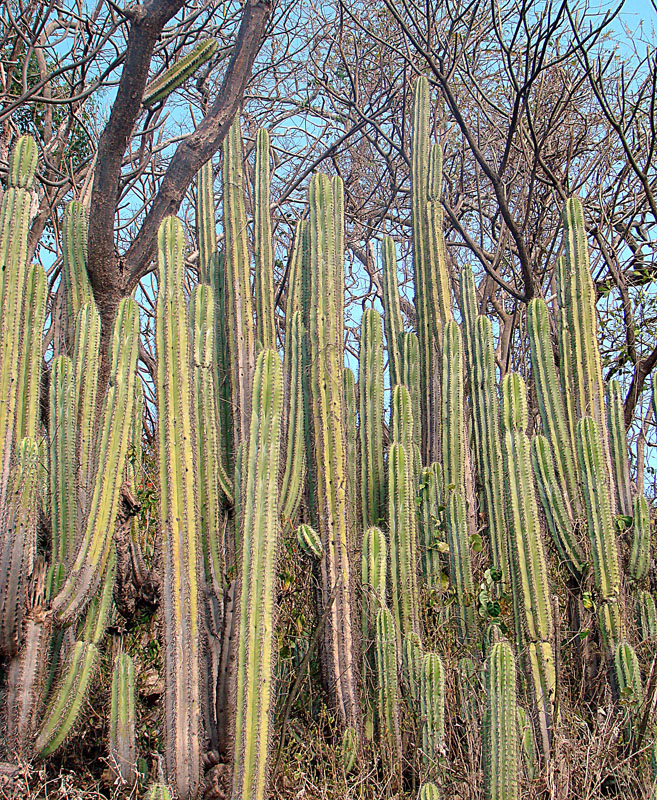
Plant growing in western Costa Rica

== Taxonomy ==
First described in 1902 by Frédéric Albert Constantin Weber as Cereus aragonii, it was named in honor of Manuel Aragon, a Costa Rican statistician. In 1951, Curt Backeberg reclassified it into the genus Marshallocereus, established the year prior. Common names include Guanocal, Organo, Pitahaya, and Tuna.
