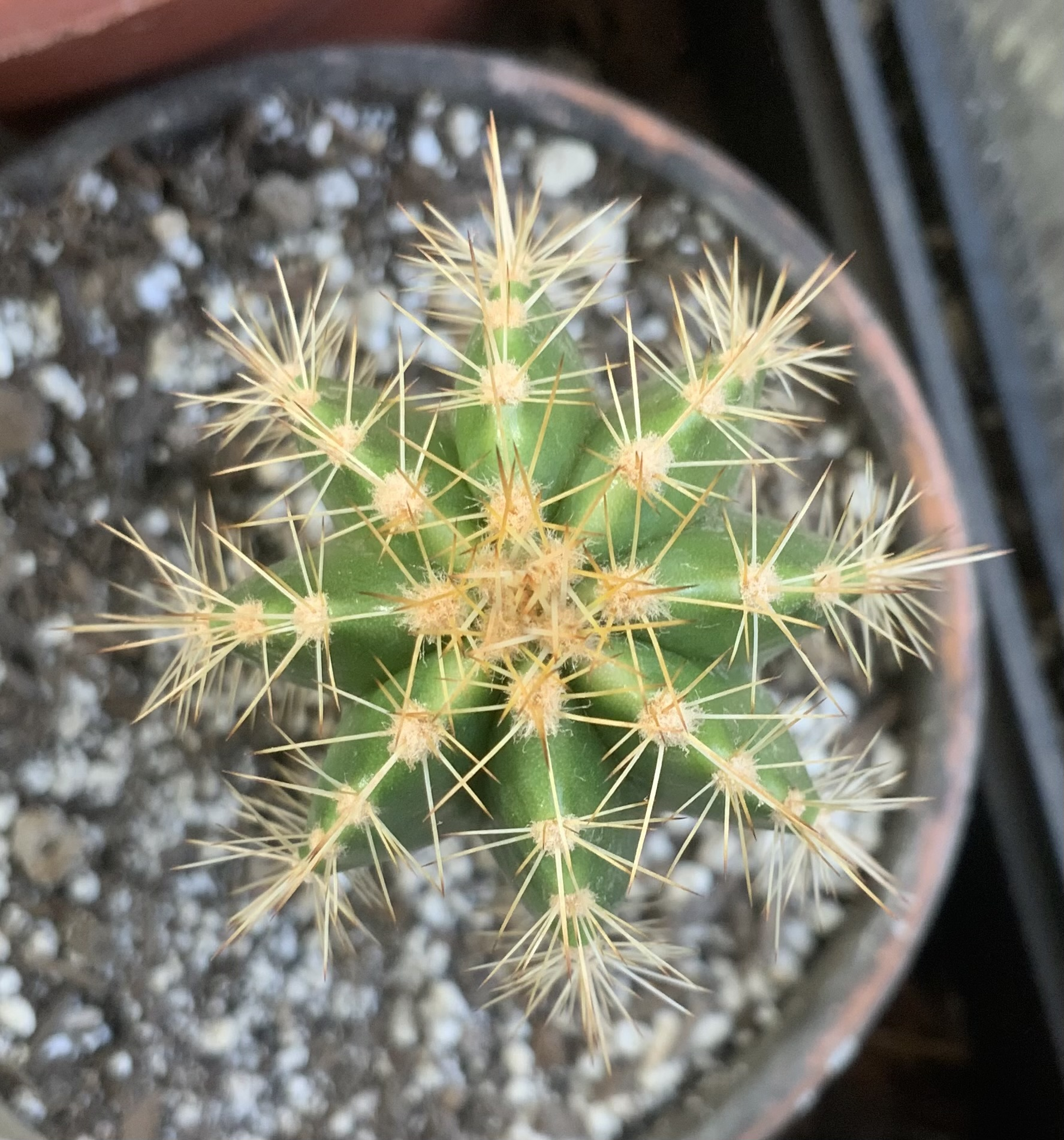

Scientific classification
- Kingdom: Plantae
- Clade: Tracheophytes
- Clade: Angiosperms
- Clade: Eudicots
- Order: Caryophyllales
- Family: Cactaceae
- Subfamily: Cactoideae
- Tribe: Echinocereeae
- Genus: × Patrocereus; M.H.J.van der Meer
- Species: × P. apicicostatus

Binomial name
- × Patrocereus apicicostatus (S.Arias & Terrazas) M.H.J.van der Meer

= × Patrocereus =

× Patrocereus apicicostatus

Hybrid genus of cacti

× Patrocereus apicicostatus is a species of cacti, the only one in the hybrid genus × Patrocereus. It is thought to be a natural hybrid between Mitrocereus militaris and Pachycereus pecten-aboriginum. Its generic name comes from those of its parents ("Mitrocereus" and "Pachycereus") and its specific epithet, "apicicostatus" refers to the Latin ăpex (stem ăpĭc-) ‘apex, tip’ + Latin costātus ‘ribbed’. For the ribbed apex of the fertile zone of the stems.

The cactus was first found by a group of researchers in 2003 visiting the Balsas river Basin. They discovered a plant resembling the stature of Mitrocereus, yet the golden hairs only grow on certain tips. It also resembles the stem structure of Pachycereus pecten-aboriginum. The vegetative characteristics of the specimens show a clear mid point between the two. The area was revisited several times in the years following, solidifying the status of the hybrid. In 2008, enough evidence was collected and the genus was described as ×Pachebergia. Then in 2021, when the name Backebergia was changed to Mitrocereus, The name of the notogenus followed.
