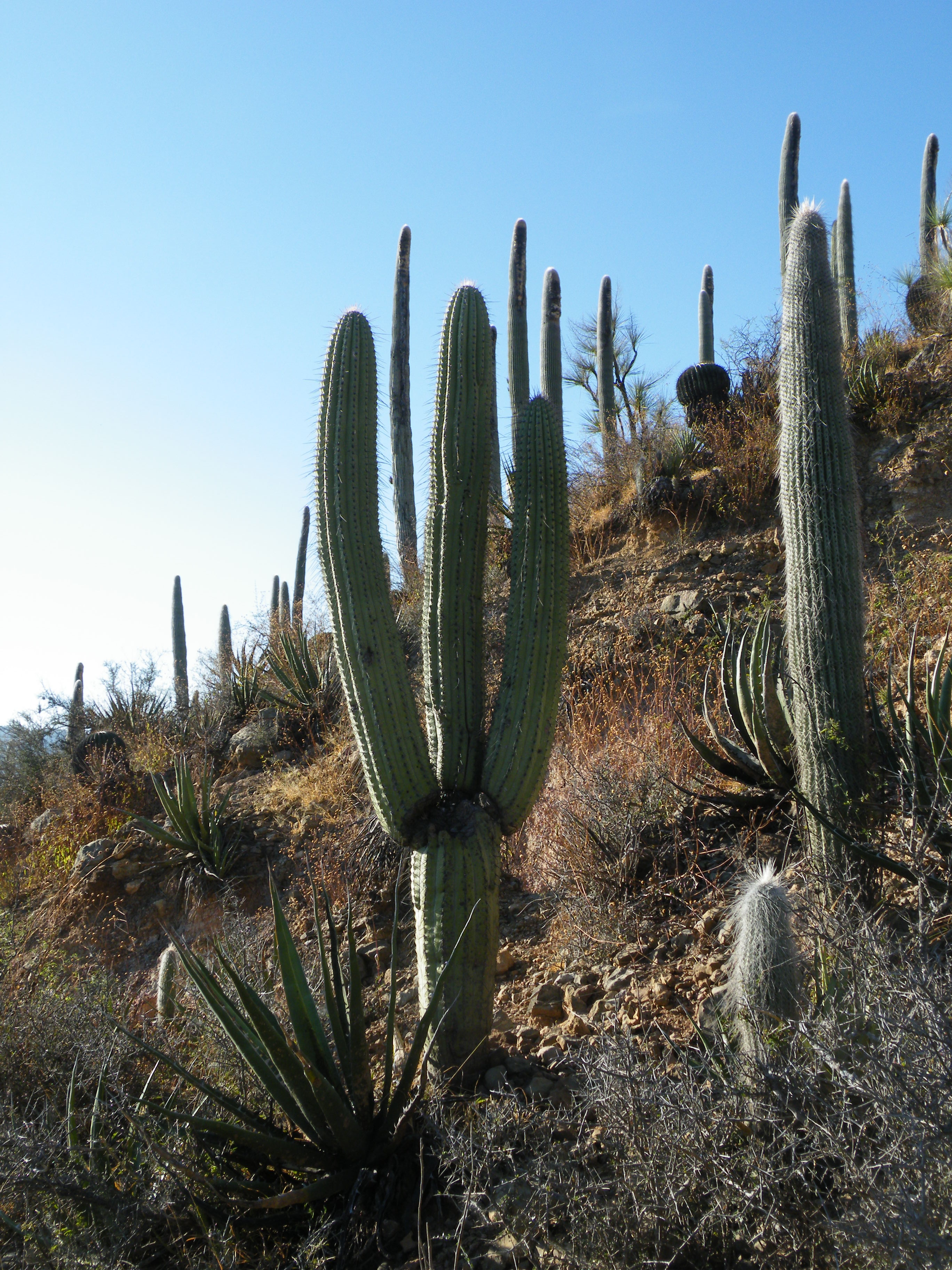

Conservation status
- Least Concern (IUCN 3.1)

Scientific classification
- Kingdom: Plantae
- Clade: Embryophytes
- Clade: Tracheophytes
- Clade: Spermatophytes
- Clade: Angiosperms
- Clade: Eudicots
- Order: Caryophyllales
- Family: Cactaceae
- Subfamily: Cactoideae
- Genus: Cephalocereus
- Species: C. macrocephalus

Binomial name
- Cephalocereus macrocephalus F.A.C.Weber ex K.Schum.
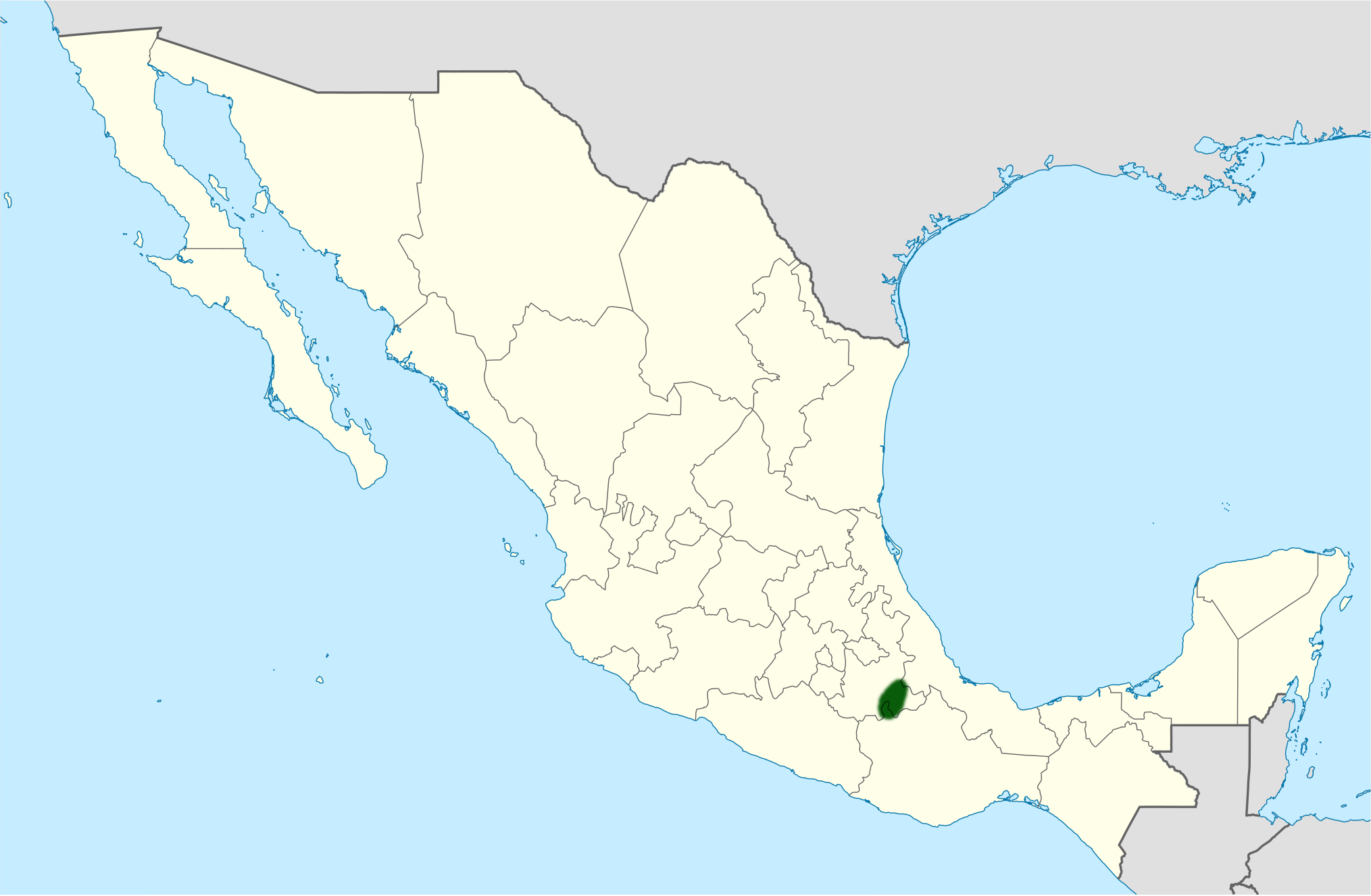

Synonyms
- Carnegiea macrocephala (F.A.C.Weber ex K.Schum.) P.V.Heath; Cereus macrocephalus (F.A.C.Weber ex K.Schum.) A.Berger; Cereus ruficeps (F.A.C.Weber) Vaupel; Mitrocereus ruficeps (F.A.C.Weber) Backeb.; Neobuxbaumia macrocephala (F.A.C.Weber ex K.Schum.) E.Y.Dawson; Pachycereus ruficeps (F.A.C.Weber) Britton & Rose; Pilocereus macrocephalus (F.A.C.Weber ex K.Schum.) F.A.C.Weber; Pilocereus ruficeps F.A.C.Weber

= Cephalocereus macrocephalus =

Species of cactus

Cephalocereus macrocephalus, synonym Neobuxbaumia macrocephala, is a species of cactus endemic to Mexico (the states of Puebla and Oaxaca).

== Description ==
Cephalocereus macrocephalus usually grows in branches, but sometimes also singly, and reaches heights of 7 to 15 meters. The trunk has a diameter of 30 to 60 centimeters. The columnar, cloudy green shoots are up to 12 meters long and have a diameter of 30 to 40 centimeters. The 17 to 26 ribs are low and blunt. One of the one to three, 4 to 5 centimeter long central spines is flattened. The spread, grayish eight to twelve marginal spines are up to 1 centimeter long. The terminal pseudocephalium consists of large areoles that bear abundant yellow wool and numerous bristles.

The cylindrical to tubular flowers appear in a circle from the pseudocephalium near the shoot tips. They are white, 1.2 to 1.6 centimeters long and reach a diameter of 2.1 to 2.8 centimeters. Its pericarpel and flower tube are covered with small tubercles and broad scales. The purple-red, spherical fruits are up to 2 centimeters long and covered with scales.

== Taxonomy ==
The species was first described in 1897 by Karl Moritz Schumann with the name accredited to Frédéric Albert Constantin Weber. The specific epithet (macrocephalus) is derived from the ancient Greek words makrós (μακρός) meaning "long" and kephalḗ (κεφαλή) meaning "head".

== Distribution ==
Cephalocereus macrocephalus is widespread in the Mexican state of Puebla in the Tehuacán Valley.

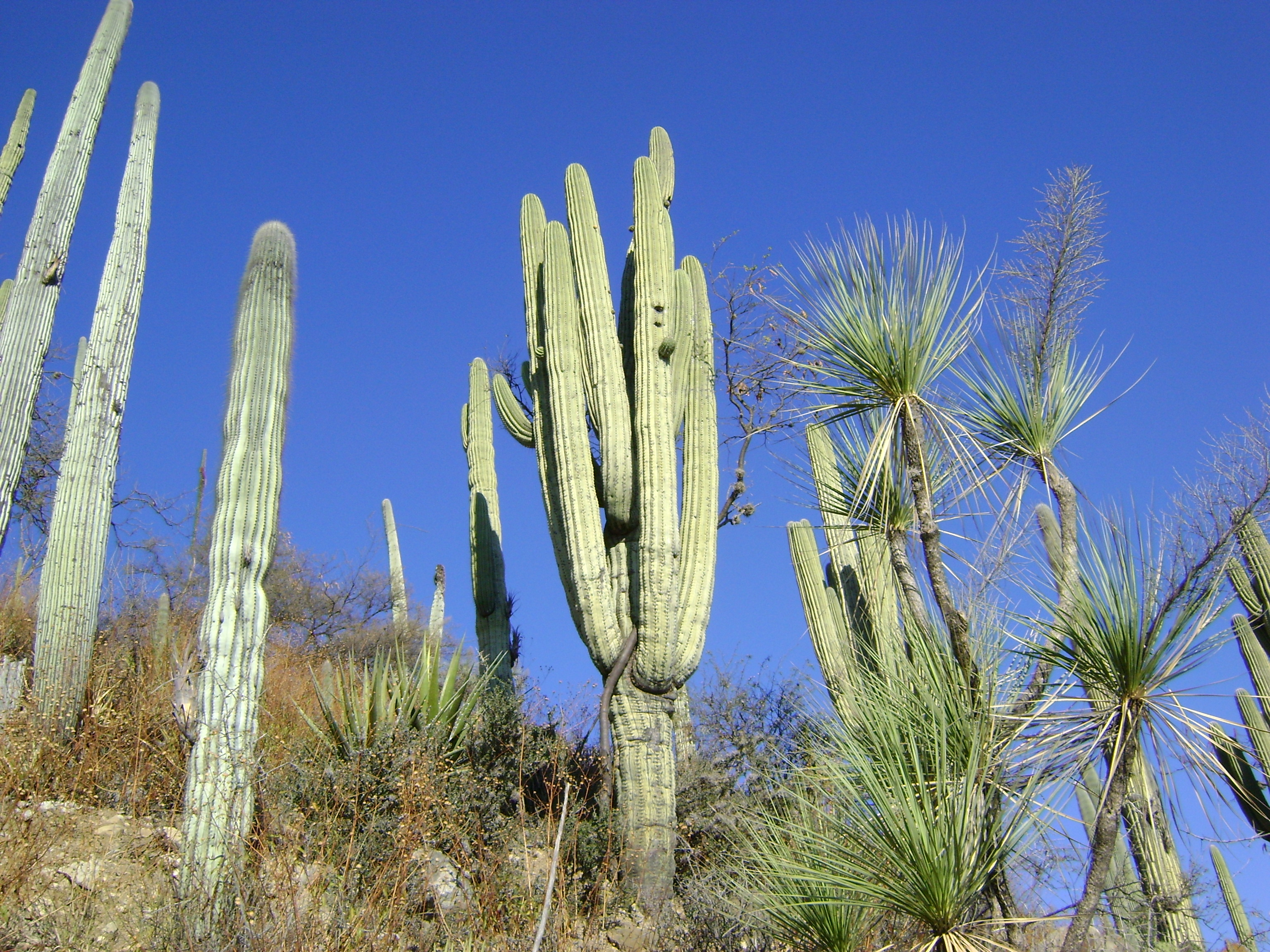
Habitat in Zapotitlan De Las Salinas, Puebla

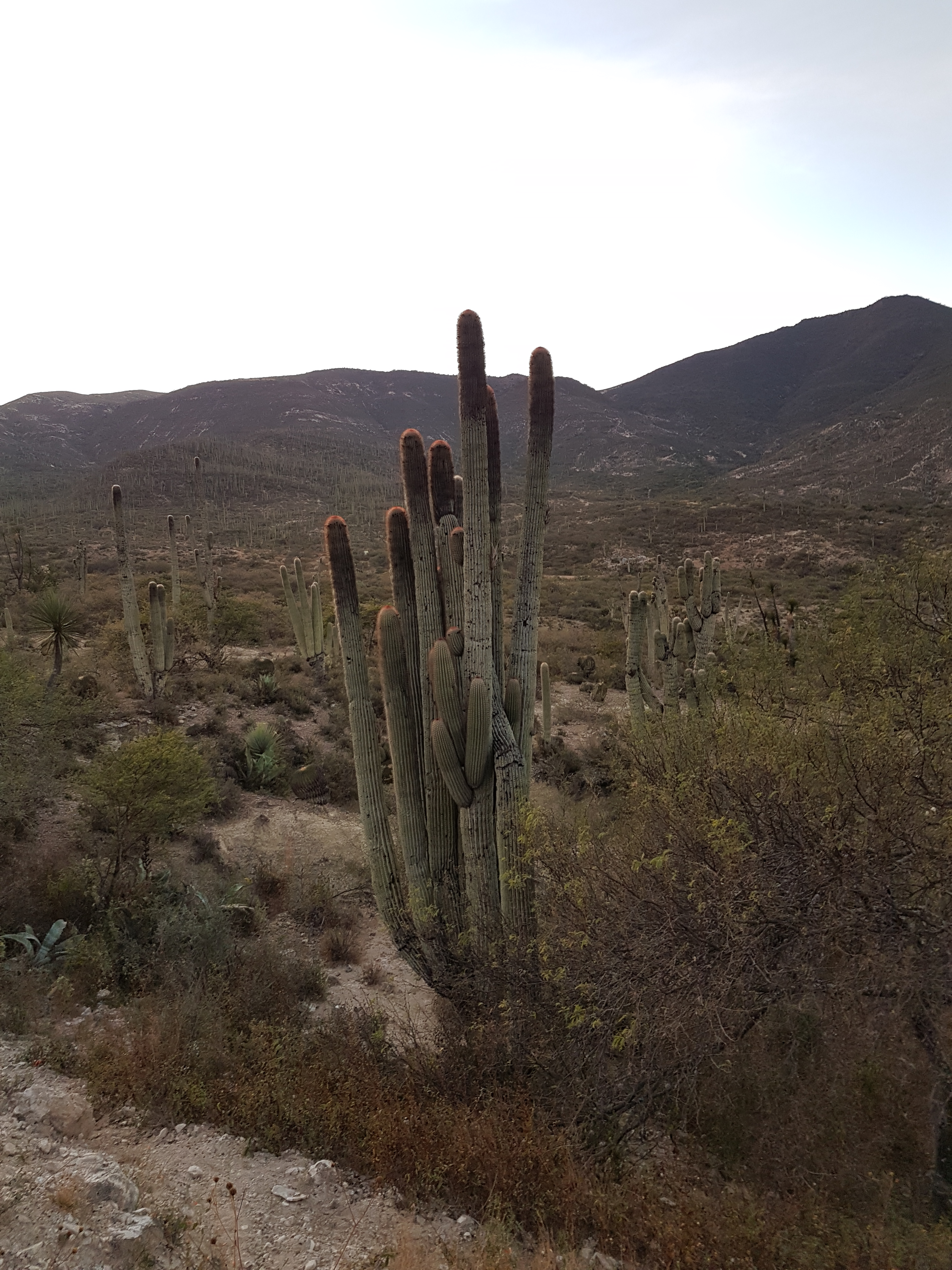
Plant near Zapotitilán, Puebla.

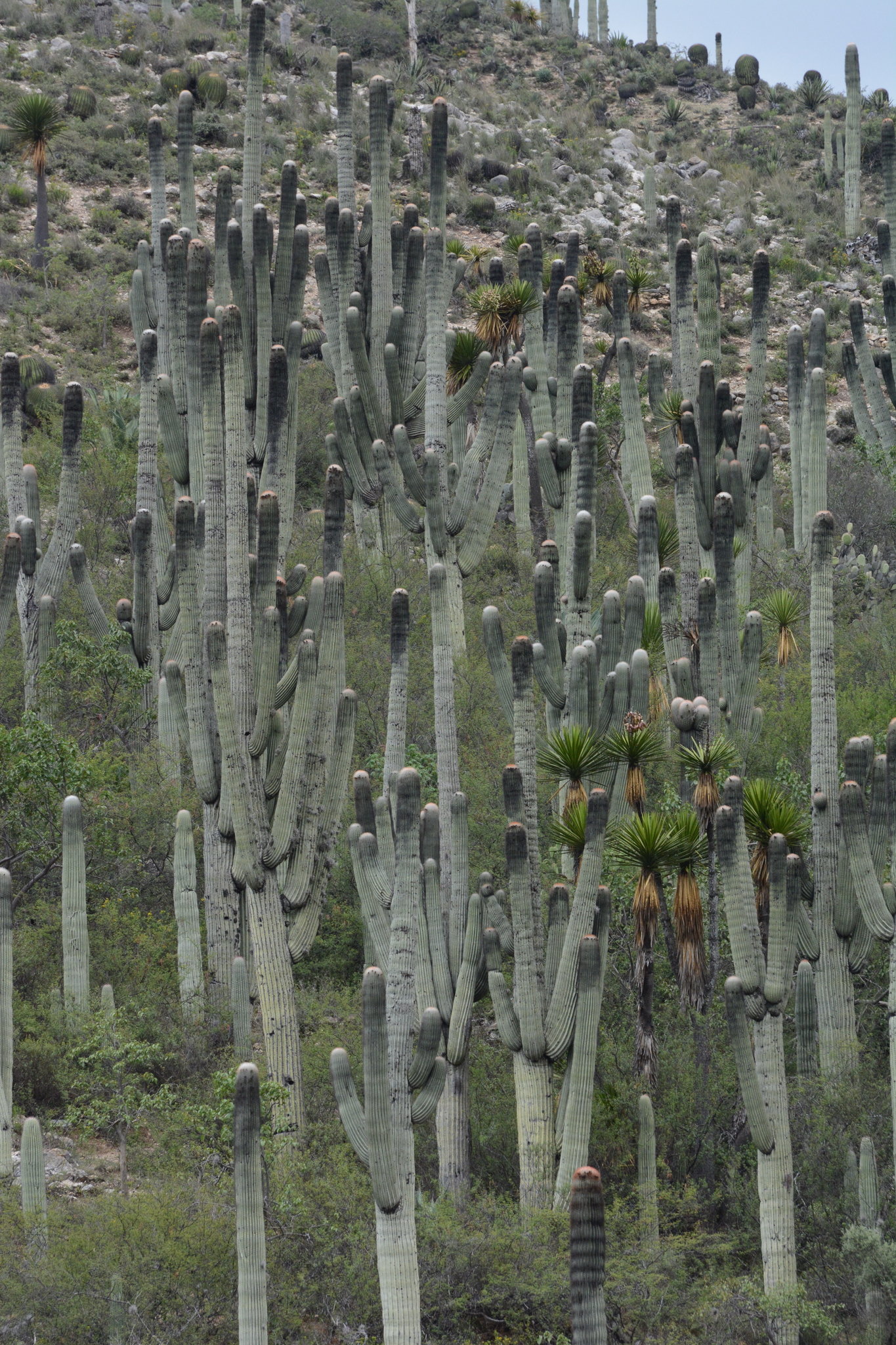
Habitat in Caltepec, Puebla, Mexico

== Ecology ==
The flowers of Cephalocereus macrocephalus are mainly nocturnal, opening at sunset (19:00) and closing in the morning (10:00). The bats Choeronycteris mexicana, Leptonycteris curasoae, and Leptonycteris nivalis are the main pollinators that promote seed production. Fruits ripen from June to August and are consumed by bats and bird species that probably act as seed dispersers.

The microbiota associated with this species include methylotrophic bacteria, both in its stem surface and inside the plant. Their function might be related to the growth promotion of C. macrocephala, but it has not been demonstrated yet.
