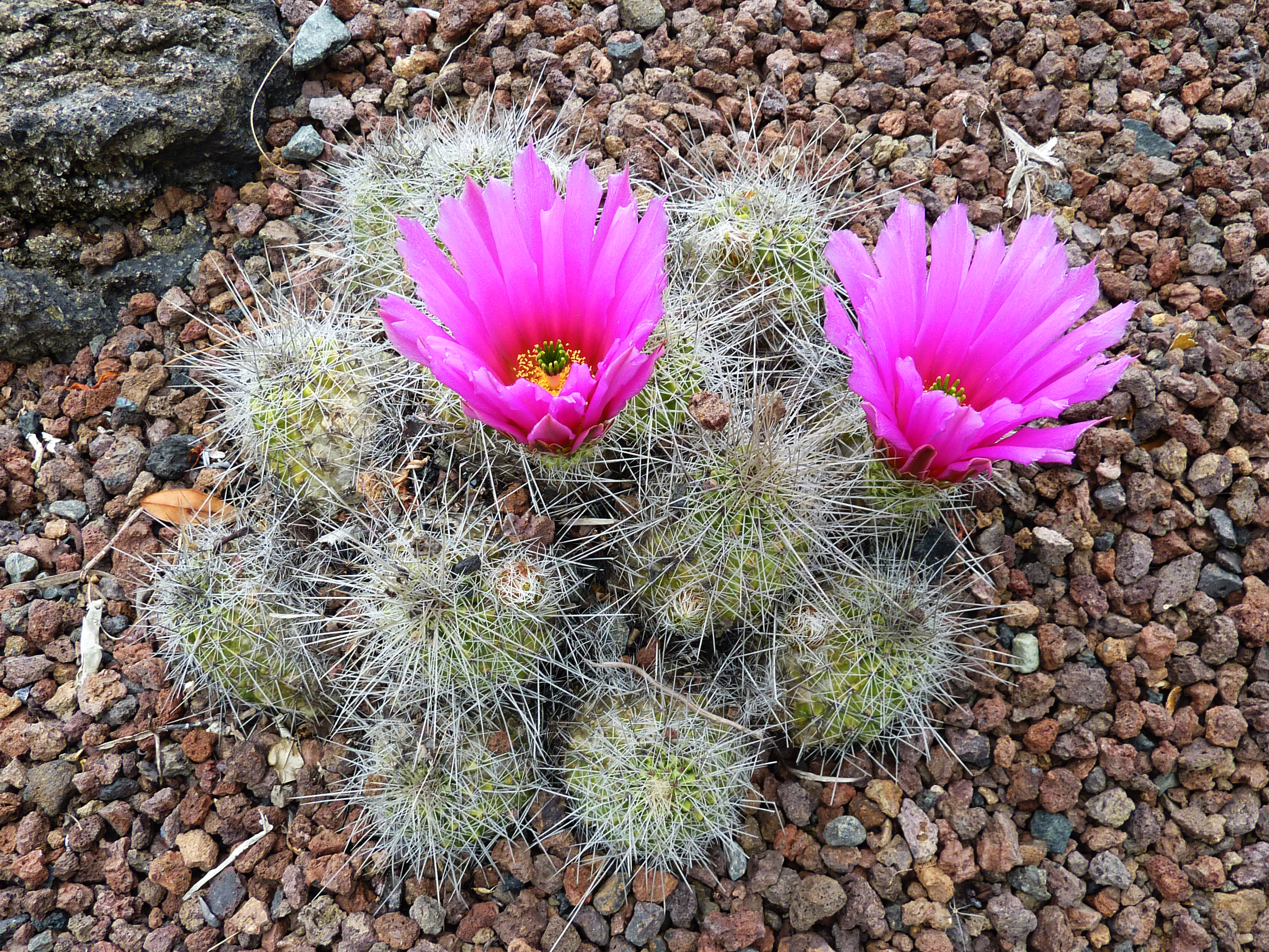

Conservation status
- Least Concern (IUCN 3.1)

Scientific classification
- Kingdom: Plantae
- Clade: Tracheophytes
- Clade: Angiosperms
- Clade: Eudicots
- Order: Caryophyllales
- Family: Cactaceae
- Subfamily: Cactoideae
- Genus: Echinocereus
- Species: E. stramineus

Binomial name
- Echinocereus stramineus (Engelm.) F.Seitz

Synonyms
- Cereus stramineus Engelm. 1857 publ. 1856; Echinocereus enneacanthus var. stramineus (Engelm.) L.D.Benson 1969; Cereus conglomeratus (C.F.Först. ex K.Schum.) A.Berger 1905; Echinocereus conglomeratus C.F.Först. ex K.Schum. 1898; Echinocereus enneacanthus var. conglomeratus (C.F.Först. ex K.Schum.) L.D.Benson 1974; Echinocereus stramineus subsp. conglomeratus (C.F.Först. ex K.Schum.) W.Blum 2015; Echinocereus stramineus var. conglomeratus (C.F.Först. ex K.Schum.) Bravo 1974; Echinocereus stramineus subsp. stramineus

= Echinocereus stramineus =

Species of cactus

Echinocereus stramineus is a species of cactus, with stramineus meaning made of straw. There are various common names such as strawberry cactus, porcupine hedgehog cactus, straw-color hedgehog, and pitaya. The straw-colored spines distinguishes this particular plant from other Echinocereus. The aged spines may turn white in color and are very fragile.

== Description ==
=== Vegetative characteristic ===
Echinocereus stramineus has various stems from which a sexual mature plant can have a number of stems from 10–50 to 100–350. The largest stem reported was 1 meter in diameter with up to 500 stems. The most unusual feature of this plant is the number of ribs per stem. Normally, it has 11–17 ribs per stem and the average ribs per stem is 12 so it is easier to distinguish this from other Echinocereus. In E. stramineus, the areoles are circular in shape and normally 7–15 mm apart. Each areole contains average 2–4 central spines and 7–10 radial spines in which radial spines are acicular and 2–3 cm in length.

=== Flowers and fruits ===
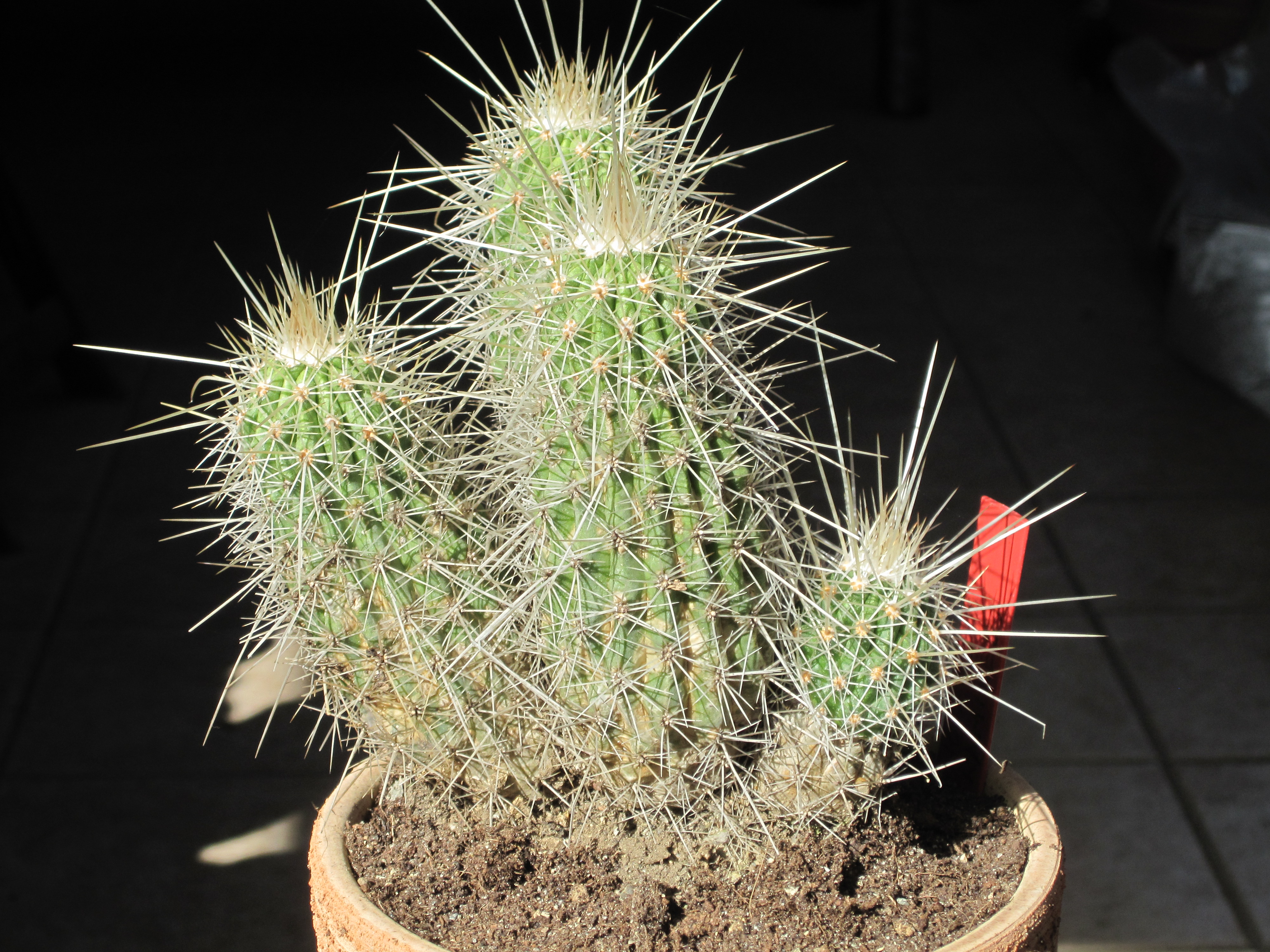
Echinocereus stramineus

Echinocereus stramineus flowers in late March to May and flowers are average 8.5 to 12.5 cm in diameter and length. The inner tepals are deep red compared to the outer portion of the tepals. The filaments are 0.8–1 cm long and are reddish, and anthers are yellow in color. (Filament and anther are the male structures.) The green stigma lobes (usually 10–13 lobes and average 8 mm long) are supported by reddish styles (usually 2.7 cm long and 2.5 mm thick). There are also rare individuals reported by Big Bend National Park where pure white flowers are found instead of the usual red. Fruits are globular in shape and 5–6 cm in diameter. The color will turn reddish brown when ripe, and the areoles on the fruit can be easily removed.

== Distribution ==
Echinocereus stramineus is natively found in the United States (New Mexico and southwest Texas) and Mexico (Coahuila, Chihuahua, and Nuevo León). It prefers a similar living environment to other cactus such as desert, river and higher mountains. There are certain specific areas in Mexico and United States where the plants occur. For example, United States; southern Trans-Pecos and the Big Bend region, Terrell Co. and lower Pecos River, Val Verde Co. (2,500–5000 ft). The region of the east side of Upton Co. to the Pecos River. South-central NM, Doña Ana, Otero, and Eddy counties. Mexico; Coahuila, East Chihuahua, West edges of Nuevo León, north Zacatecas, Northeast Durango, and N San Luis potosí.

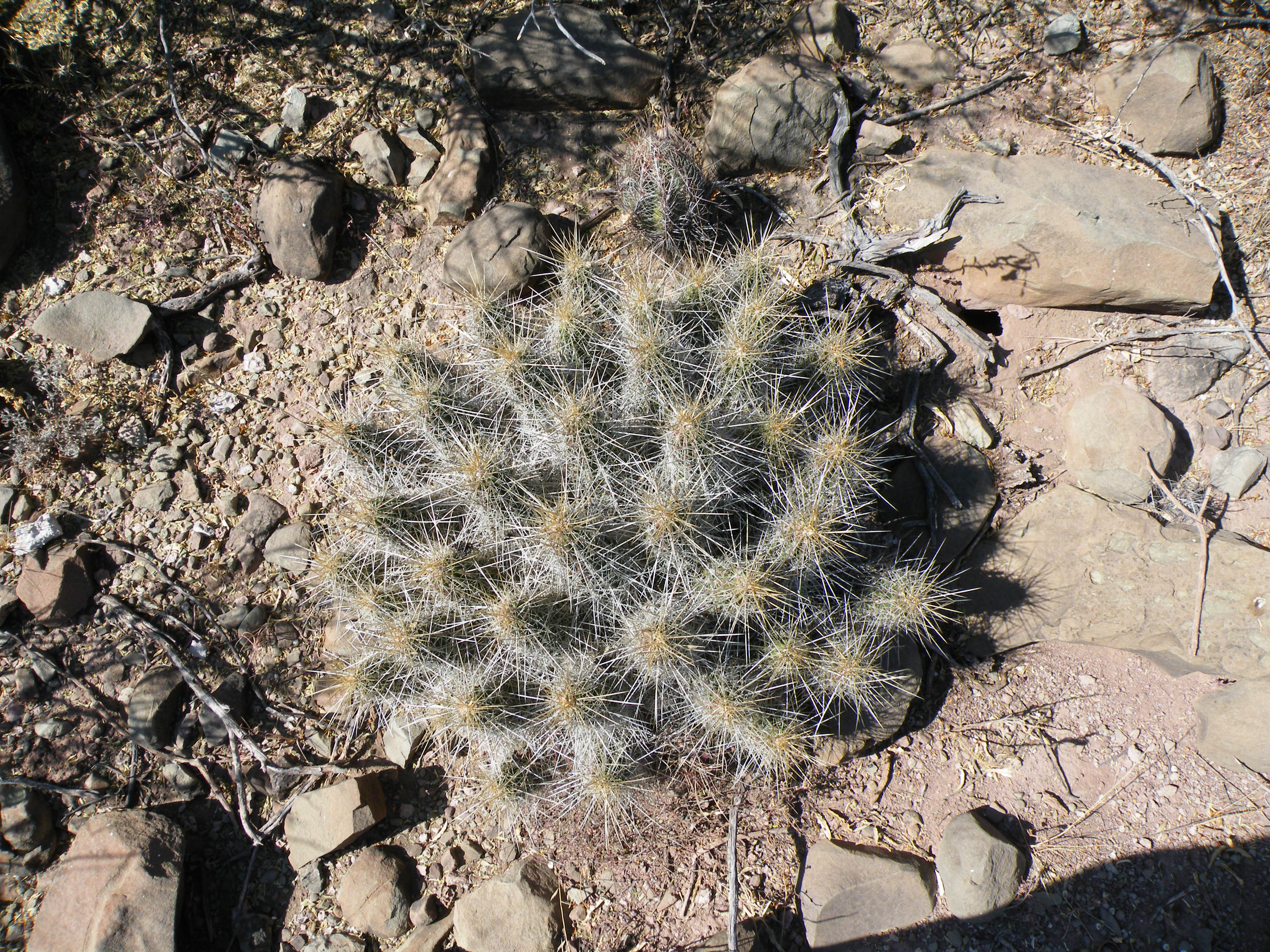
Plant growing in Saltillo towards Estacion Marte, Nuevo Leon

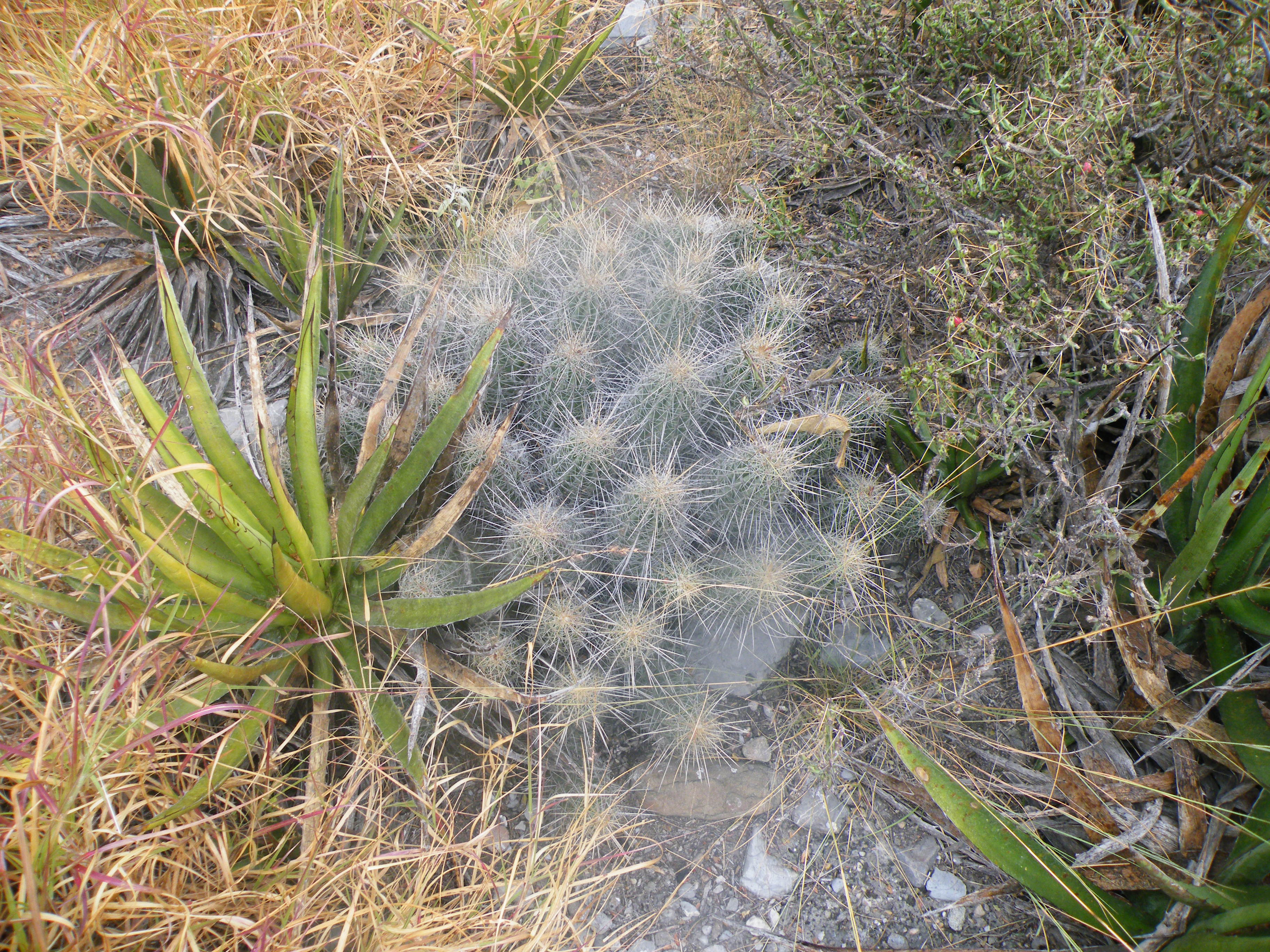
Plant growing near Fed Highway 40

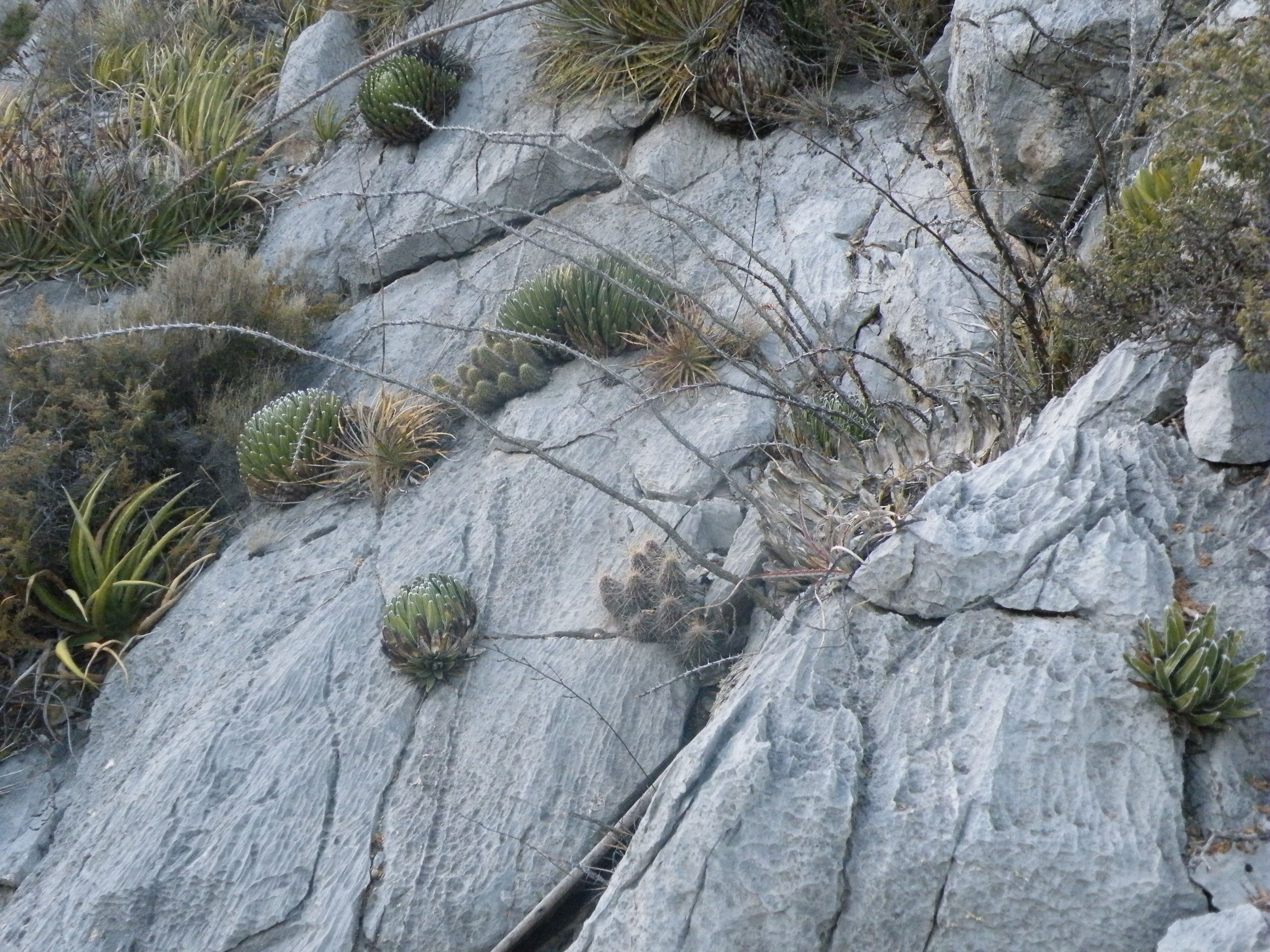
Habitat near Huasteca Canyon, Nuevo Leon with plants growing along with Agave victoriae-reginae.

== Taxonomy ==
This species was first described as Cereus stramineus by George Engelmann in 1856. Francisco Seitz placed the species in the genus Echinocereus in 1870
