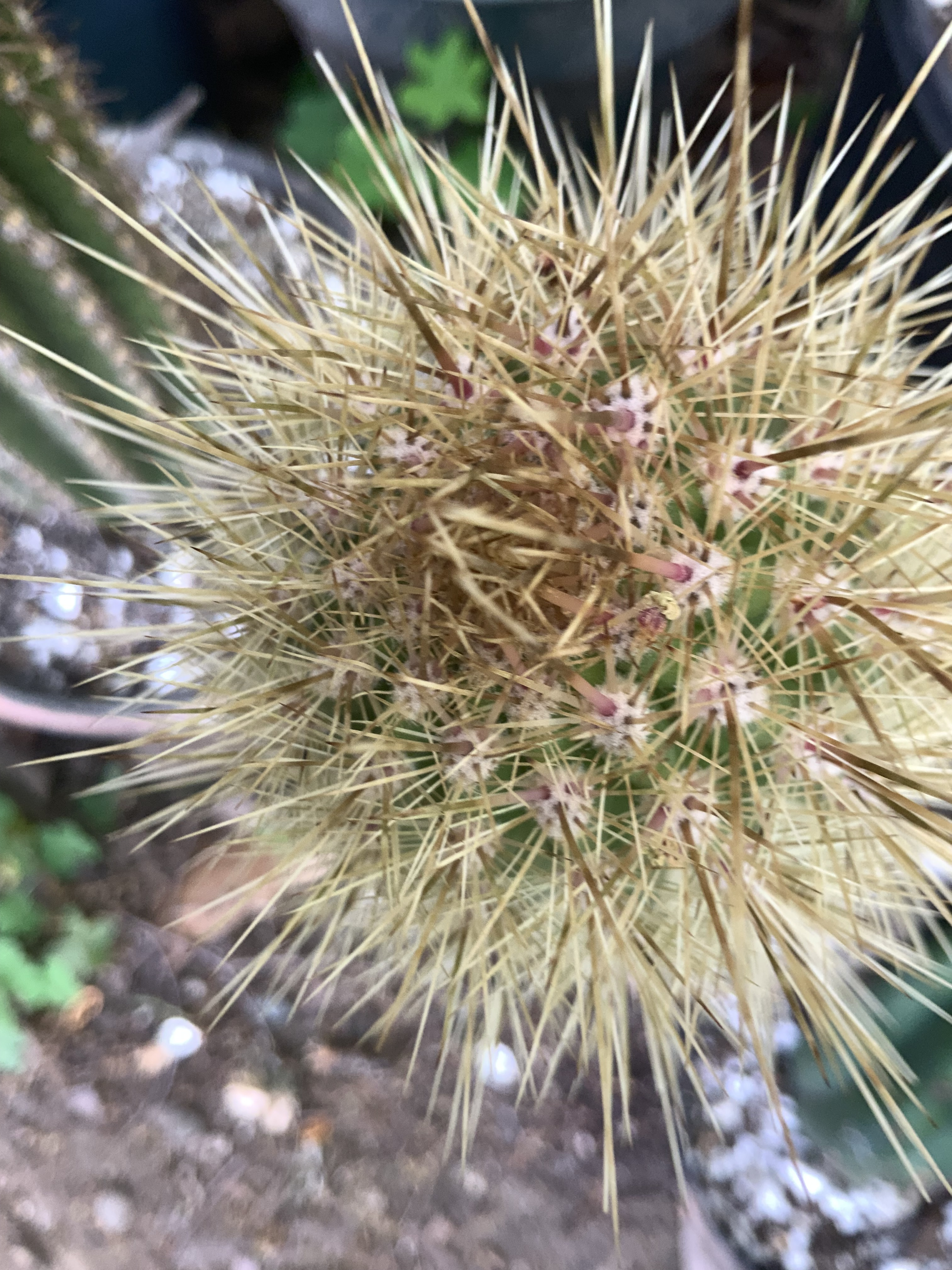

Scientific classification
- Kingdom: Plantae
- Clade: Tracheophytes
- Clade: Angiosperms
- Clade: Eudicots
- Order: Caryophyllales
- Family: Cactaceae
- Subfamily: Cactoideae
- Tribe: Echinocereeae
- Genus: × Pacherocactus; G.D.Rowley
- Species: × P. orcuttii

Binomial name
- × Pacherocactus orcuttii (K.Brandegee) G.D.Rowley

Synonyms
- Cereus × orcuttii K.Brandegee; × Pachgerocereus orcuttii (K.Brandegee) Moran; Pachycereus × orcuttii (K.Brandegee) Britton & Rose

= × Pacherocactus =

Hybrid genus of cacti

× Pacherocactus is a nothogenus of shrubby cactus, with only one known species, × Pacherocactus orcuttii. It is a natural hybrid between Pachycereus pringlei and Bergerocactus emoryi, discovered near Rosario, Baja California, Mexico. The plant's generic name is formed from those of its parents (Pachycereus and Bergerocactus); sometimes it can be found listed as Pachycereus × Bergerocactus. This plant is known from less than half a dozen plants in the wild.

== Characteristics ==
× Pacherocactus orcuttii can grow to a height of about 3.5 m and a diameter of about 10 cm. For temperatures this cactus doesn't like to go below 10 °C. Its flowers are green-brown in color and of about 4 cm in size.
