= Cachapoal =

Cachapoal may refer to:

- Cachapoal, Bío Bío, a village located in the municipality of San Carlos, in Ñuble Province, Bío-Bío Region, Chile
- Cachapoal Province, a province of the region of O'Higgins, Chile
- Cachapoal River, a tributary river of the Rapel River in Chile located in the Libertador General Bernardo O'Higgins Region.
  - Cachapoal Valley
- Cachapoal Valley (wine region), a wine growing area in the Cachapoal Province of central Chile
