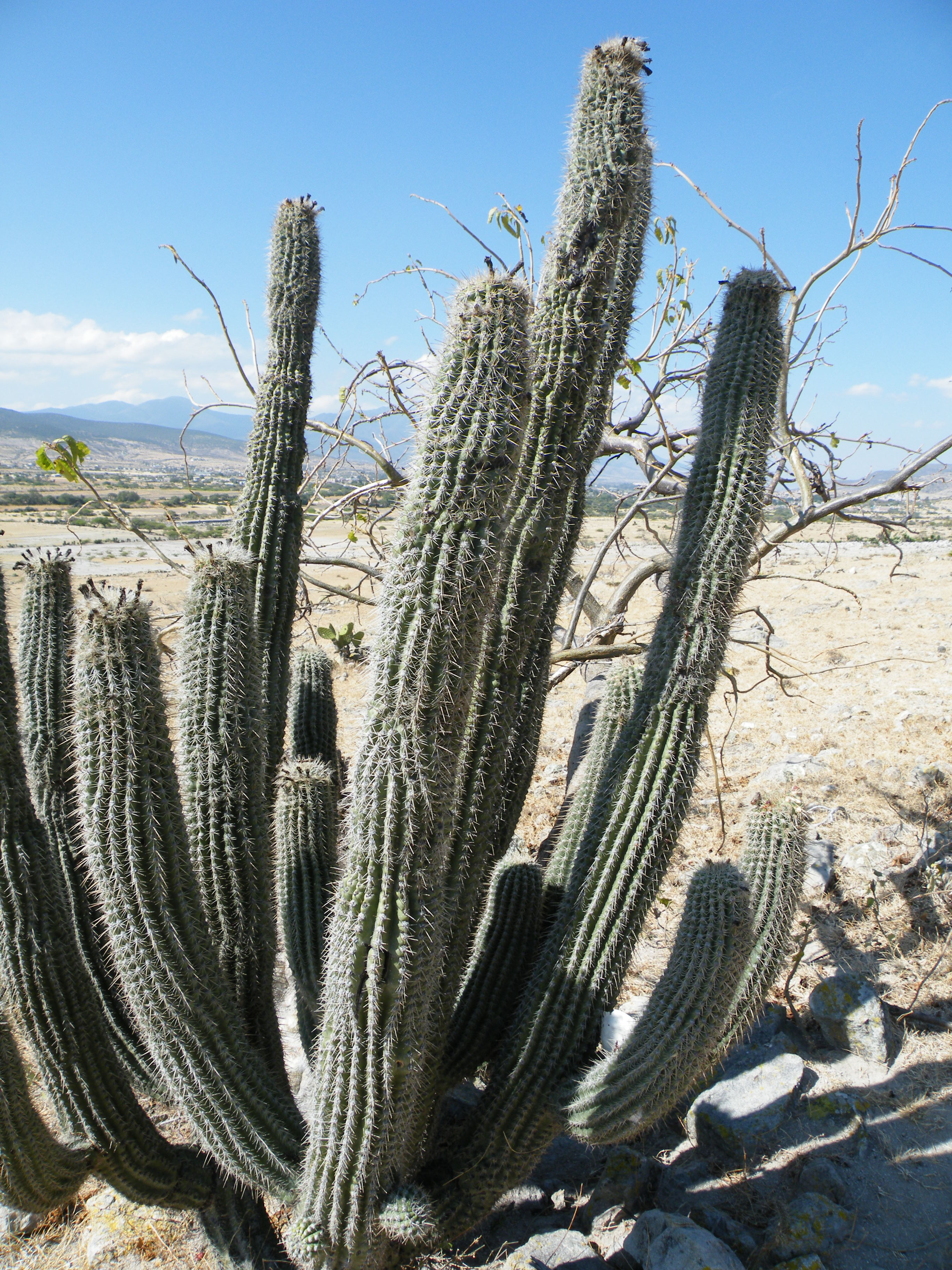

Conservation status
- Least Concern (IUCN 3.1)

Scientific classification
- Kingdom: Plantae
- Clade: Embryophytes
- Clade: Tracheophytes
- Clade: Spermatophytes
- Clade: Angiosperms
- Clade: Eudicots
- Order: Caryophyllales
- Family: Cactaceae
- Subfamily: Cactoideae
- Genus: Stenocereus
- Species: S. treleasei

Binomial name
- Stenocereus treleasei (Vaupel) Backeb.

Synonyms
- Cereus treleasei (Rose) Vaupel 1913; Lemaireocereus treleasei Rose 1909; Rathbunia treleasei (Rose) P.V.Heath 1992

= Stenocereus treleasei =

Species of plant

Stenocereus treleasei, commonly known as tunillo, is a species of flowering plant in the family Cactaceae, native to Oaxaca in Mexico.

== Description ==
A shrubby, candelabriform cactus. Individuals can reach 15 m (49 ft) in height, with several branches emerging from a central trunk or base. Branches are dark to bluish green with a diameter of up to 22 cm (8.7 in) and 15 to 20 blunt and slightly curved ribs. Areoles are pale and circular, 2 cm (0.79 in) to 2.5 cm (0.98 in) apart, with more than ten radial spines. Spines are 0.4 cm (0.16 in) to 1.3 cm (0.51 in) in length and gray in color.

Flowers have pink or red tepals, with numerous, yellowish white stamens. Fruits are ellipsoid or spherical 3 cm (1.2 in) to 5 cm (2.0 in) in length, 2.5 cm (0.98 in) to 4 cm (1.6 in) in width, red peel and red, orange, yellow, or purple pulp, and black seeds.

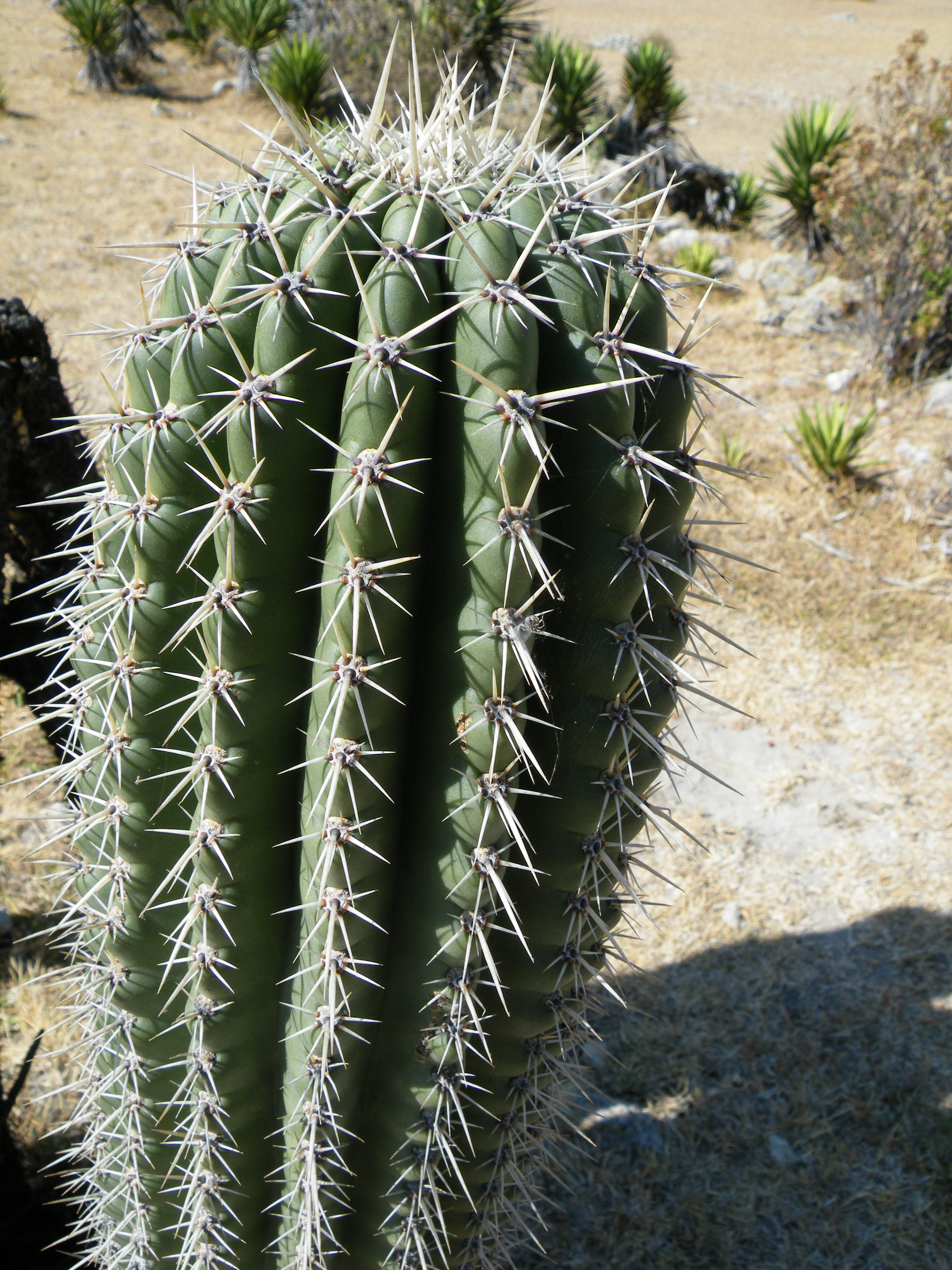
Spines

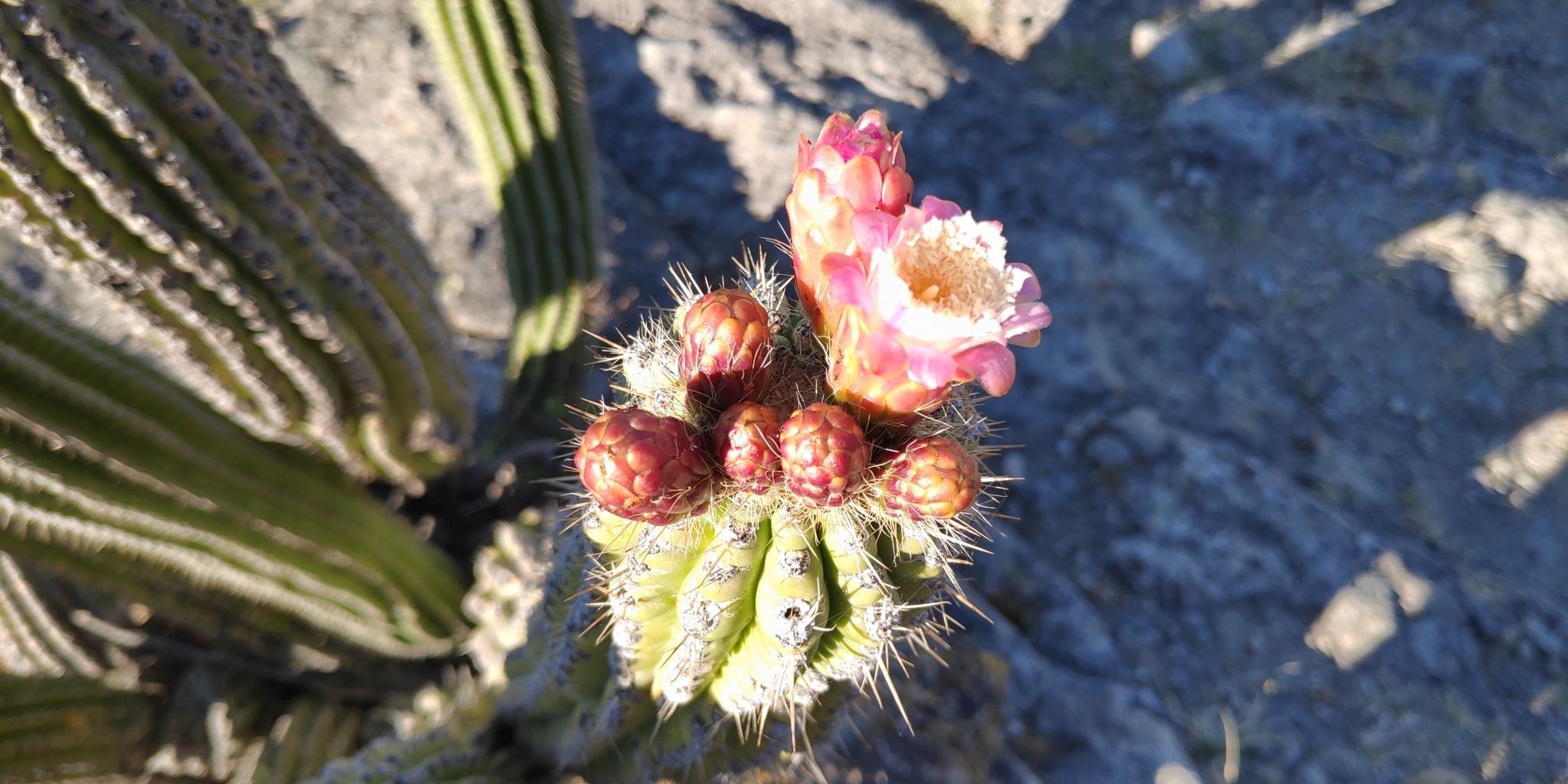
Flowers

=== Fruit ===
The fruit grown is a type of dragon fruit, and is referred to as pitaya to the locals. Its fruit is edible, giving it economically value for trade in the region. The fruit can be used for medicine giving it more value to the Latin American region. By being able to grow a fruit makes the species part of the Magnoliophyta phylum and the plant seed group of Angiosperms.

It has mutualistic relation to the lesser long-nosed bat. The bat will migrate down South in Mexico to its region. When food is scarce the bat will eat the fruits produced from columnar cacti, including Stenocereus treleasei. The bat helps pollinate the cacti by having the cacti's pollen stick to the bat's fur when consuming its fruit.

== Distribution ==
Distributed in the Mexican state of Oaxaca at altitudes of 1,300 to 1,800 meters.

=== Habitat ===
A species characteristic of the Central Valleys of Oaxaca. Found at elevations between approximately 1,200 metres (3,900 ft) and 2,000 metres (6,600 ft). It forms part of the thorn-scrub and tropical dry forests in valleys and slopes in soils derived from volcanic rocks and limestones. In some areas, S. treleasei becomes the dominant component in the plant associations called pitayeras or tunillales by local people. There, it is commonly associated with several species of Bursera, Ceiba aesculifolia, Vachellia cochlyacantha, Vachellia acatlensis, Mimosa spp., Senna spp., Parkinsonia praecox, Ipomoea arborescens, Ipomoea murucoides, Agave americana, Agave potatorum, Agave karwinski, and several species of columnar cacti such as Lophocereus marginatus, Myrtillocactus geometrizans, and Myrtillocactus schenckii, among others.

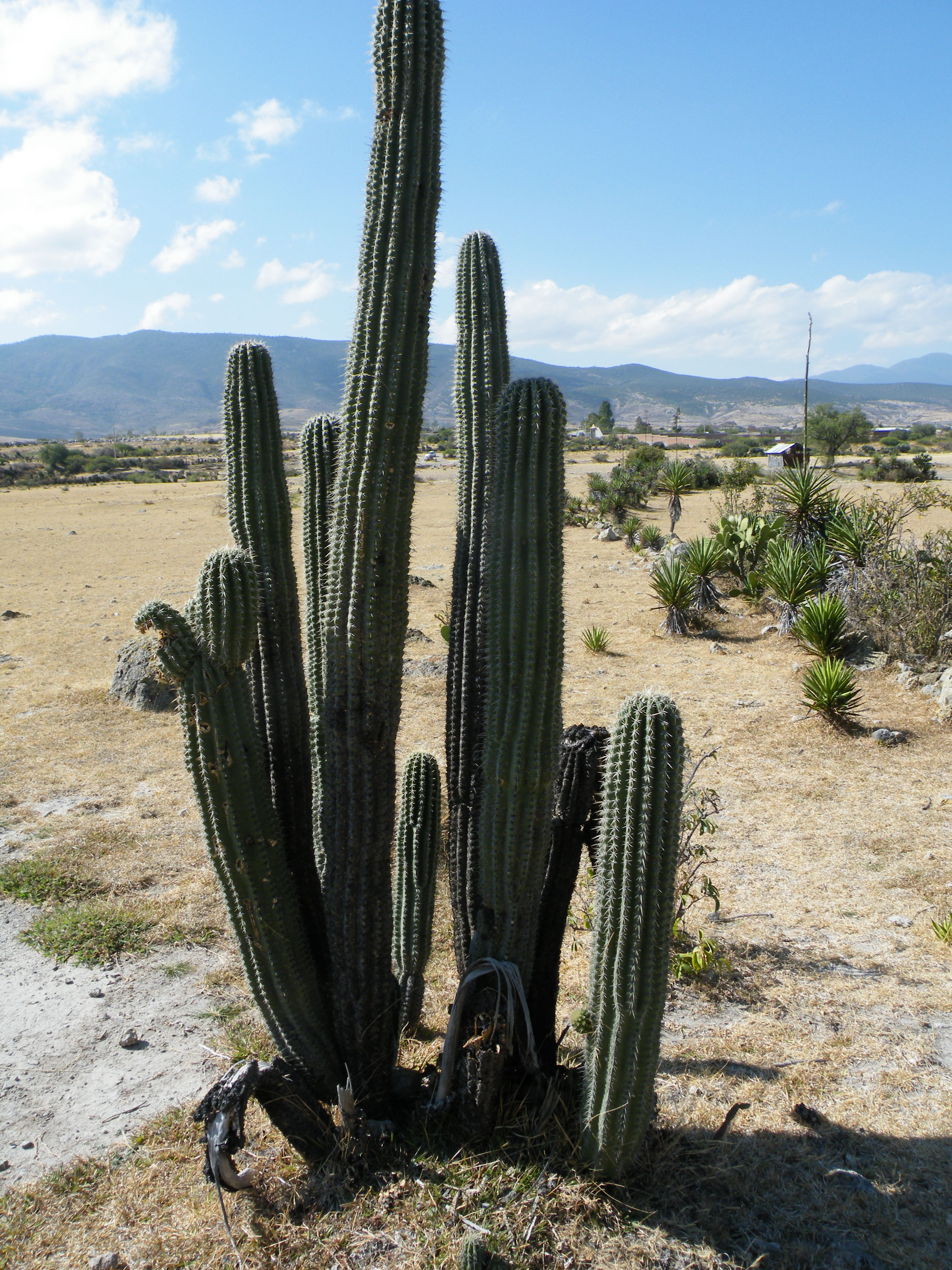
Habitat near Mitla, Oaxaca

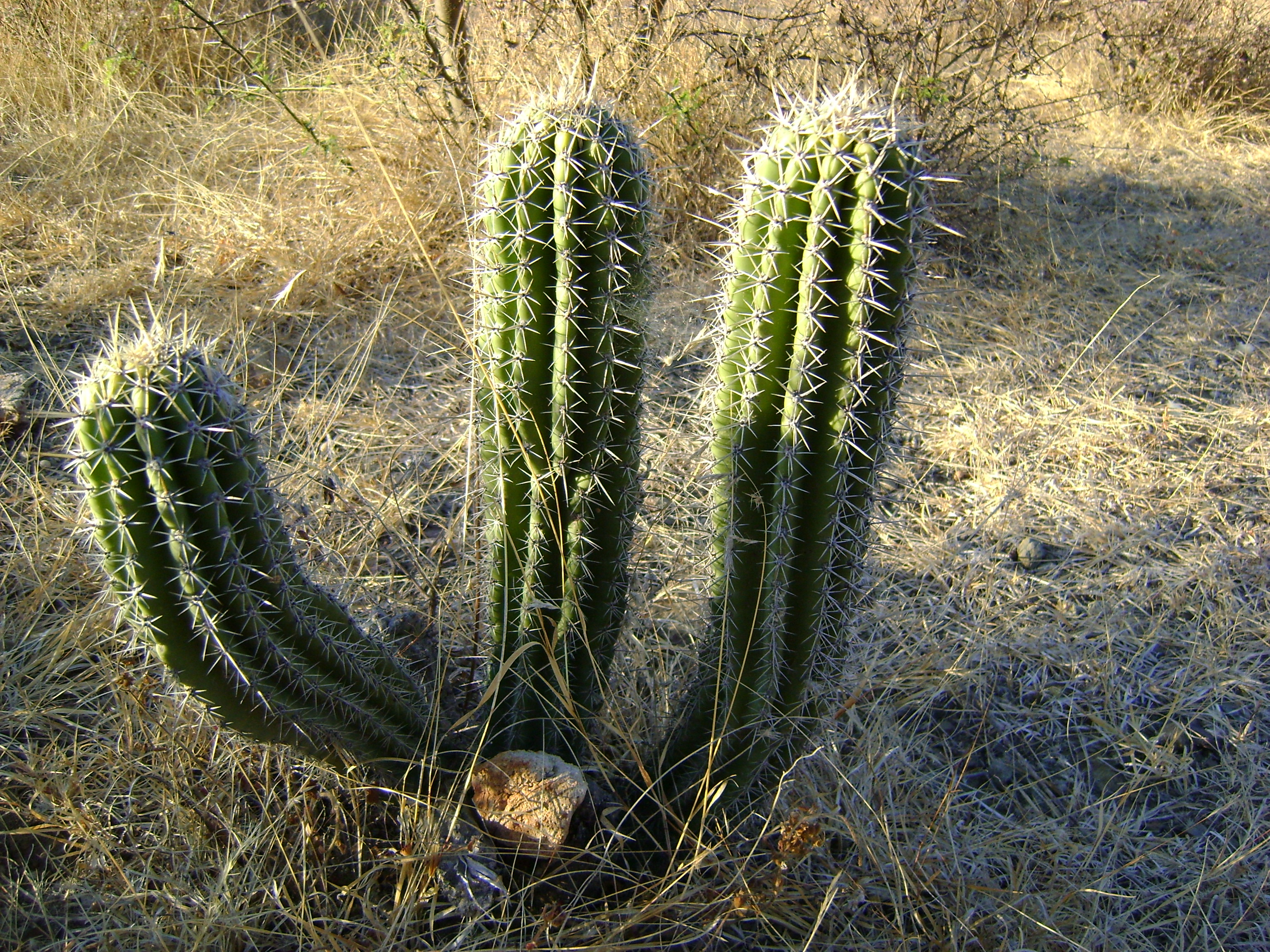
Plant growing near Tlacolula De Matamoros, Oaxaca

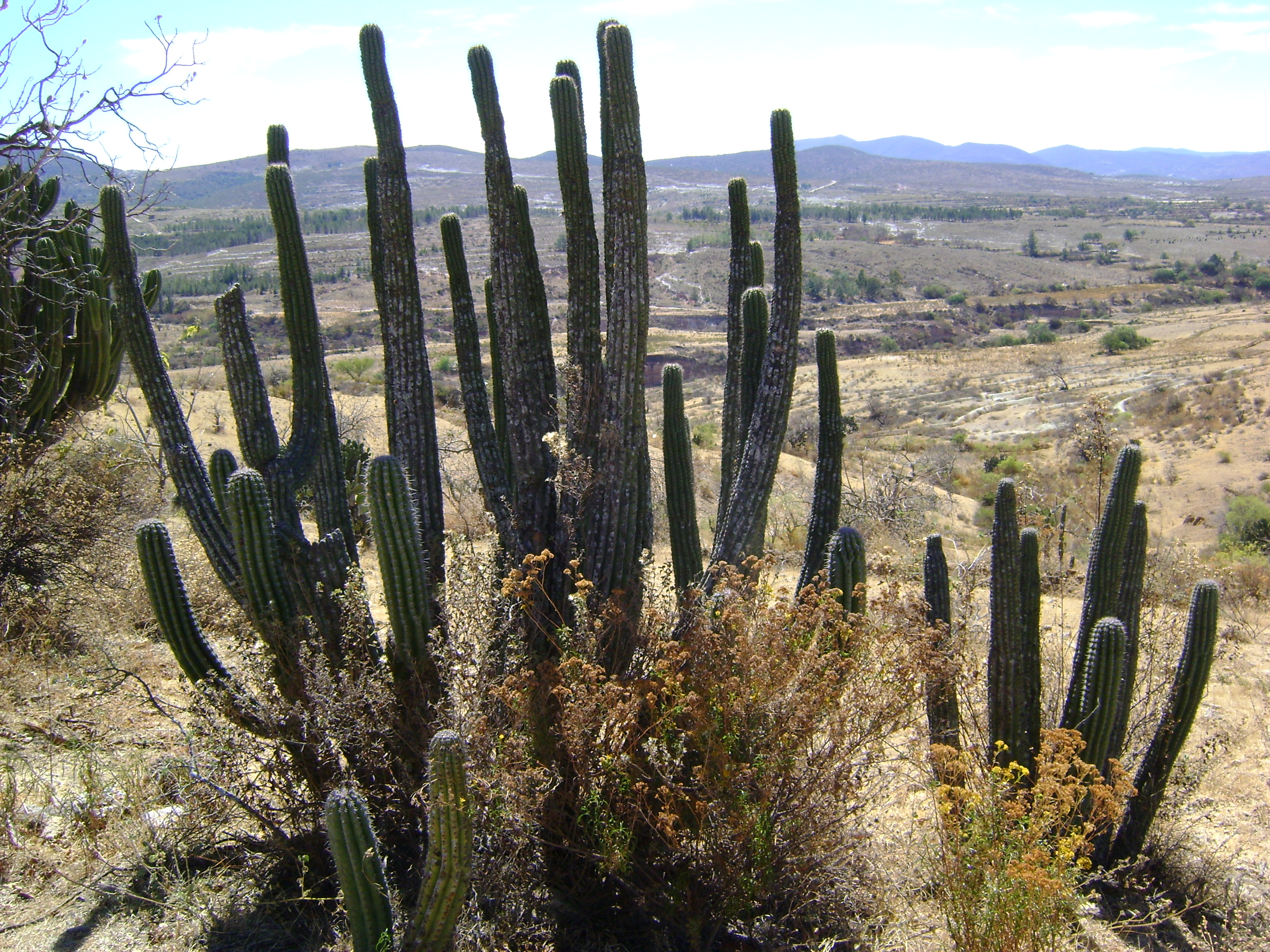
Plant growing outside Teotongo, Oaxaca

== Taxonomy ==
The plant was first described as Lemaireocereus treleasei in 1909 by Joseph Nelson Rose. Curt Backeberg placed the species in the genus Stenocereus in 1960.

== Research ==
Researchers in Venezuela analyzed cell anatomy of 22 columnar cacti species, including S. treleasei. They found all tested species had simple epidermis and epidermis cells in S. treleasei were dividing a multistratified epidermis was forming. This made S. treleasei's outermost cells look like papilla. Its abundant divisions in the epidermal cells made it distinguishable from most cacti.

Being distributed in the Northern Hemisphere its cuticles were found to be thin like many many other cacti with the similar distribution range. With the group of species being studied S. Treleasei was put in a group having more than 7 layers in its hypodermis.

Through this research scarce silica bodies were found in some of the species from the group being researched. Some to name that had scarce silica bodies were Stenocereus beneckei and Stenocereus kerberi. Species with silica bodies not being observed was probably due to the claims of Arthur C. Gibson & K.E. Horak of epidermal cells of genus Stenocereus had silica bodies but they were so small they were hardly visible. Although no silica bodies were observed in S. treleasei the finding of silica bodies helped pursue more research of Stenocerus silica bodies size and variation.
