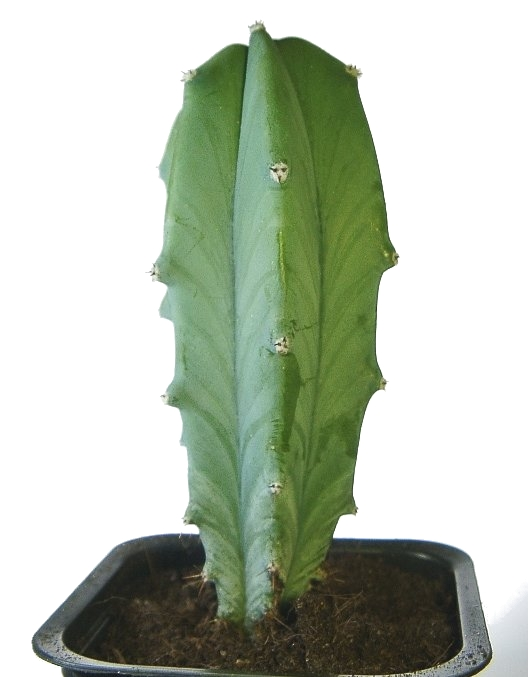
- Myrtillocactus geometrizans

Scientific classification
- Kingdom: Plantae
- Clade: Tracheophytes
- Clade: Angiosperms
- Clade: Eudicots
- Order: Caryophyllales
- Family: Cactaceae
- Subfamily: Cactoideae
- Tribe: Echinocereeae
- Genus: Myrtillocactus; Console

Species
- Myrtillocactus cochal Myrtillocactus geometrizans - whortleberry cactus etc.

= Myrtillocactus =

Genus of cacti

Myrtillocactus (from Latin, "blueberry cactus") is a genus of cacti. The genus is found from Mexico to Guatemala. The genus is best known with Myrtillocactus geometrizans.

The genus Myrtillocereus Fric & Kreuz. (orth. var.) has been brought into synonymy with this genus.

== Description ==
The largest plants in this genus can grow as tall as 13 meters. This cactus tends to flower in the summer and creates edible purple berries.

== Extant species ==
Image	Scientific name	Common name	Distribution
	Myrtillocactus cochal (Orcutt) Britton & Rose	Cochal, Candelabra Cactus	Baja California peninsula of Mexico.
	Myrtillocactus eichlamii Britton & Rose		Guatemala
	Myrtillocactus geometrizans (Mart. ex Pfeiff.) Console	bilberry cactus, whortleberry cactus or blue candle	central and northern Mexico
	Myrtillocactus schenckii (J.A.Purpus) Britton & Rose	Garambullo, Vichishovo	Guatemala; Mexico (Chiapas, Oaxaca, Puebla)

== Cultivation ==
The cuttings, which will grow quickly, from this cactus need to be taken when the temperature is high enough or the cuttings will not root. It is recommended that species should be kept dry and not under 14 °C (57 °F) in winter.

There are many cultivar varieties from monstrose or crested forms.

== See also ==
- × Myrtgerocactus - a natural hybrid involving Myrtillocactus cochal
