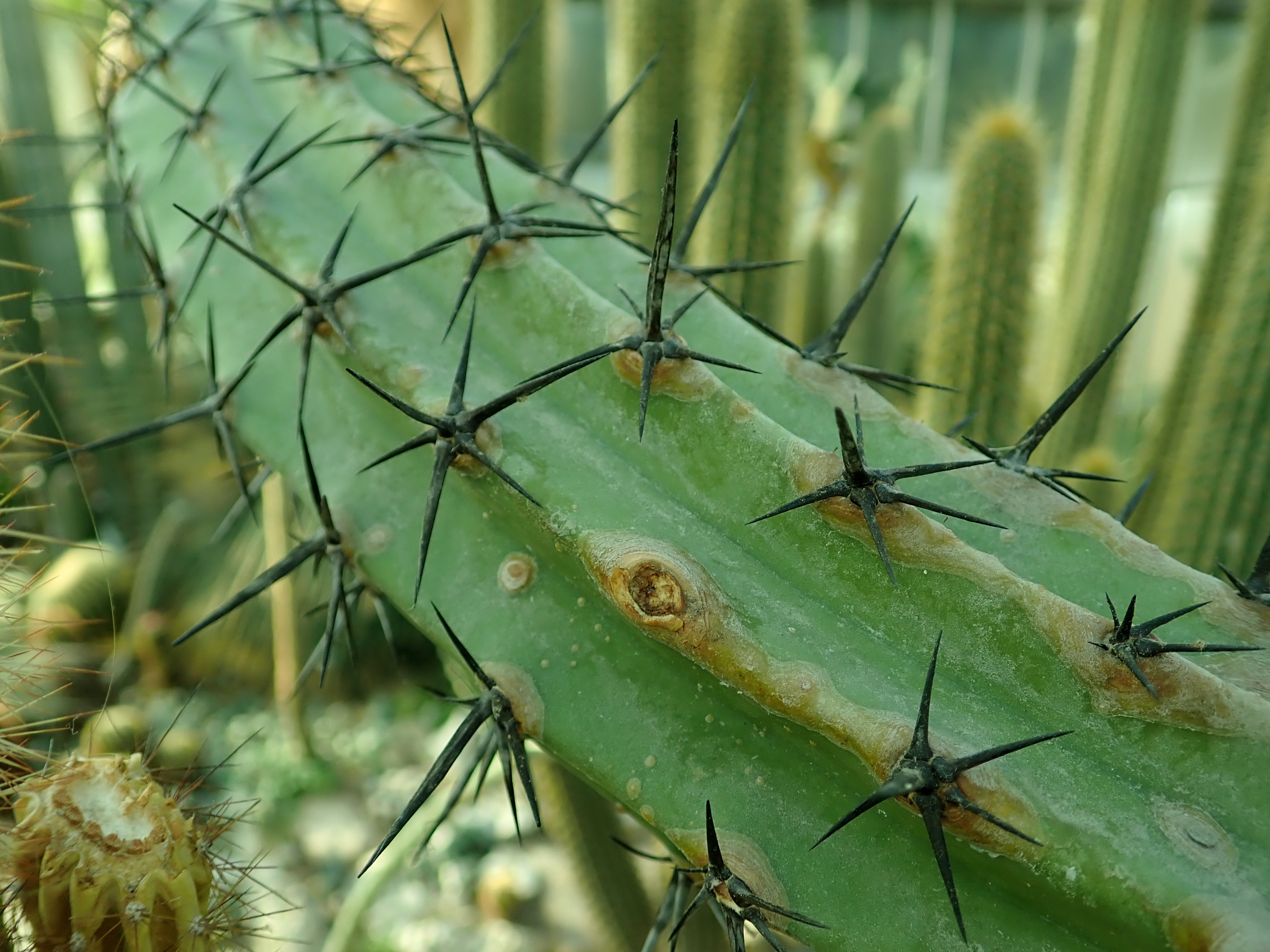
- Spines
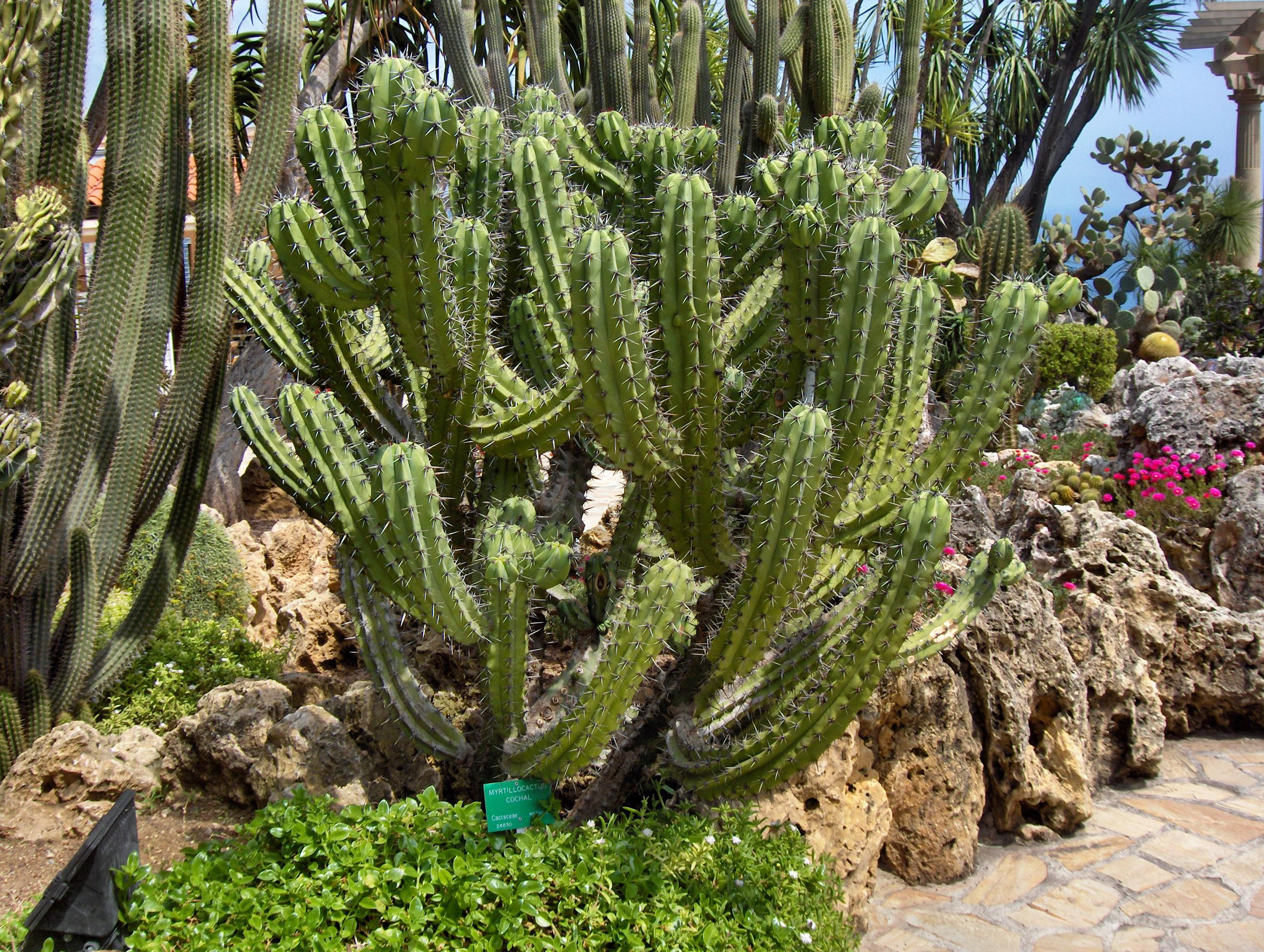
- At the Jardin Exotique de Monaco

Conservation status
- Least Concern (IUCN 3.1)

Scientific classification
- Kingdom: Plantae
- Clade: Tracheophytes
- Clade: Angiosperms
- Clade: Eudicots
- Order: Caryophyllales
- Family: Cactaceae
- Subfamily: Cactoideae
- Genus: Myrtillocactus
- Species: M. cochal

Binomial name
- Myrtillocactus cochal (Orcutt) Britton & Rose

Synonyms
- Cereus cochal Orcutt; Cereus geometrizans var. cochal (Orcutt) K.Brandegee

= Myrtillocactus cochal =

Species of plant

Myrtillocactus cochal, the cochal or candelabra cactus (a name it shares with other plants), is a species of flowering plant in the family Cactaceae, native to the Baja California peninsula. Individuals can reach 3 m (10 ft), and are hardy to USDA zone 9b.

== Description ==
Myrtillocactus cochal grows in the form of a shrub to a tree with richly branched, blue-green branches, reaches a height of 1 to 3 meters and usually forms a short trunk with 6 to 8 ribs. Areoles are 1-3 cm apart with a single, black central spine, which can occasionally be absent, is up to 2 cm long and 5 radial spines are grayish or blackish and 5 - 10 mm long.

The light greenish white flowers have a darker central stripe, are 2.5 cm long and have the same diameter. They are open both day and night. The spherical, red fruits are edible and have a diameter of 1.2 to 1.8 cm.

== Distribution ==
Myrtillocactus cochal is found on the edge of the Sonoran Desert in the Mexican states of Baja California and Baja California Sur.

== Taxonomy ==
The first description as Cereus cochal was published in 1889 by Charles Russell Orcutt. Nathaniel Lord Britton and Joseph Nelson Rose placed the species in the genus Myrtillocactus in 1909. Nomenclature synonyms are Cereus geometrizans var. cochal (Orcutt) K.Brandegee (1900) and Myrtillocactus geometrizans var. cochal (Orcutt) W.T.Marshall (1941).
