= Myrtillocactus eichlamii =

Conservation status
- Critically Endangered (IUCN 3.1)

Scientific classification
- Kingdom: Plantae
- Clade: Tracheophytes
- Clade: Angiosperms
- Clade: Eudicots
- Order: Caryophyllales
- Family: Cactaceae
- Subfamily: Cactoideae
- Genus: Myrtillocactus
- Species: M. eichlamii

Binomial name
- Myrtillocactus eichlamii Britton & Rose

Species of cactus

Myrtillocactus eichlamii is a species of Myrtillocactus found in Guatemala.

== Description ==
Myrtillocactus eichlamii grows tree-shaped with upright, striking blue-green to deep green, glaucous shoots and forms a distinct trunk. It has 6 blunt ribs with large, gray areoles spaced up to 2 centimeters apart. The central spine can reach up to 7 centimeters long, while the approximately 5 marginal spines are shorter and swollen at their base.

The creamy white flowers are 4 centimeters long and 3.5 to 5.5 centimeters in diameter, with a very short flower tube. The spherical, purple to red fruits are edible and covered with a whitish wax.

== Distribution ==
Myrtillocactus eichlamii is widespread in Guatemala.

== Taxonom ==
The species was first described in 1920 by Nathaniel Lord Britton and Joseph Nelson Rose. The specific epithet eichlamii honors the German cactus collector Friedrich Eichlam.
