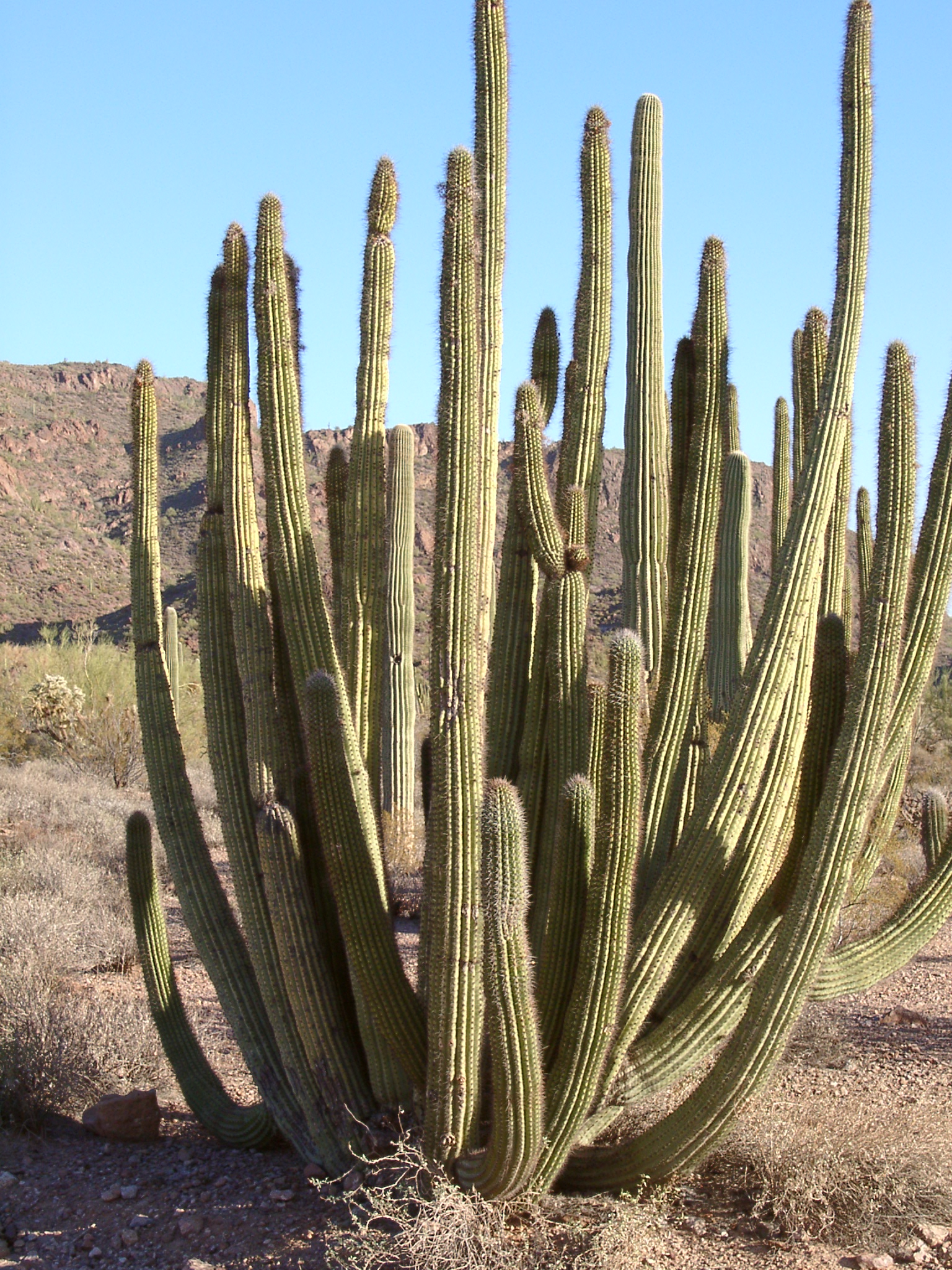
- S. thurberi thurberi

Conservation status
- Least Concern (IUCN 3.1)

Scientific classification
- Kingdom: Plantae
- Clade: Embryophytes
- Clade: Tracheophytes
- Clade: Spermatophytes
- Clade: Angiosperms
- Clade: Eudicots
- Order: Caryophyllales
- Family: Cactaceae
- Subfamily: Cactoideae
- Genus: Stenocereus
- Species: S. thurberi

Binomial name
- Stenocereus thurberi (Engelm.) Buxbaum, 1961

Synonyms
- List: Cereus thurberi Engelm.; Glandulicereus thurberi (Engelm.) Guiggi; Lemaireocereus thurberi (Engelm.) Britton & Rose; Marshallocereus thurberi (Engelm.) Backeb.; Neolemaireocereus thurberi (Engelm.) Backeb.; Rathbunia thurberi (Engelm.) P.V.Heath; Rathbunia thurberi f. cristata P.V.Heath; Rathbunia thurberi f. dichotoma P.V.Heath; Stenocereus thurberi f. cristatus (P.V.Heath) P.V.Heath; Stenocereus thurberi f. dichotomus (P.V.Heath) P.V.Heath

= Stenocereus thurberi =

Organ pipe cactus

Species of cactus

Stenocereus thurberi, the organ pipe cactus, is a species of cactus native to Mexico and the United States. The species is found in rocky desert. Two subspecies are recognized based on their distribution and height. The Organ Pipe Cactus National Monument is named for the species. Cacti are minimally adapted to particular thermal niches, and are tremendously vulnerable to seasonal precipitation.

== Description ==
This cactus species has several narrow stems that rise vertically, growing from a single short trunk just above the ground level. These stems are about 15 cm (6 in) thick and grow to a height of 5 m (16 ft), however it has been known to reach 7 to 8 m (23 to 26 ft). These stems rarely branch but rather grow annually from the tip of the last growth. The mature plant can reach a width of 3.5 m (12 ft). Each stem has twelve to nineteen 10 mm (3/8 in) high ribs that bear dark brown to black spines that turn gray as it matures. It takes 150 years to reach maturity. The older plants produce 75 mm (3 in) funnel-shaped white flowers annually which are open at night and close by the morning and have a purple or pink tint to them. These usually grow during April, May, and June. The organ pipe cactus is usually pollinated by bats. The plant also produces fruit about the size of a tennis ball. Beneath the fruit's spiny exterior is red flesh that has been described as tasting better than watermelon. This fruit has traditionally been harvested by the Seris, who call the plant ool [oːɬ], and is used as a medicine.

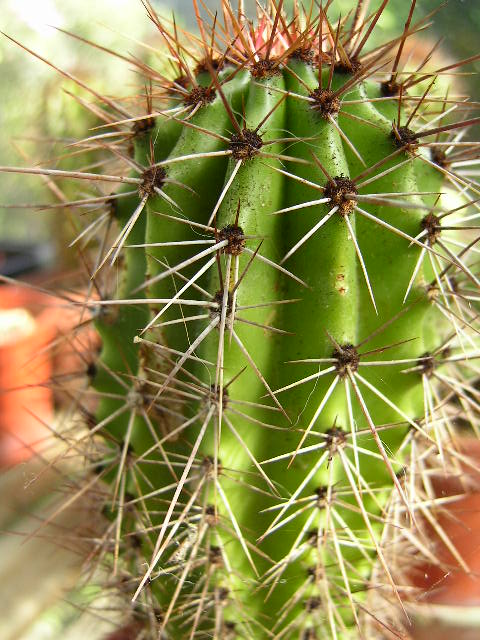
Organ pipe cactus stem

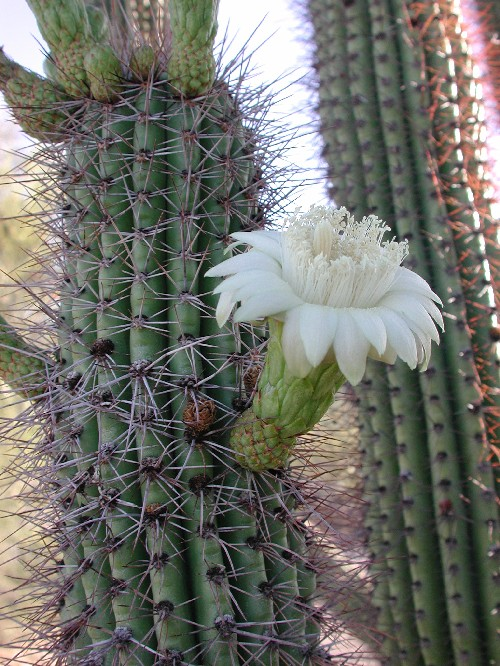
Organ pipe cactus flower

== Subspecies ==
There are two recognized subspecies:

Image	Subspecies	Description	Distribution
	Stenocereus thurberi subsp. littoralis (K.Brandegee) N.P.Taylor	Smaller plant 3 m (10 ft)	grows in the Cape region of southern Baja California.
	Stenocereus thurberi subsp. thurberi	Larger Plant	southern Arizona, mainland Mexico, and Northern Baja California

== Distribution ==
This species is found mostly in Mexico, mainly in Sonora and southern Baja California and Northern Sinaloa. It is also known to the United States, but is much rarer, with the notable exception of Organ Pipe Cactus National Monument. The plant is predominantly found on rocky hillsides up to 900 m (3,000 ft) in elevation. It is sensitive to frost, so the species is rare in low desert areas, which can be more susceptible to frost. The plant is slow growing, and prefers well-drained soil and full sun. However, when in the seedling stage, it requires shade, and will grow beneath a "nurse tree". It will need this for several years until it grows an adequate root system, which is mostly in the upper 10 cm of soil.

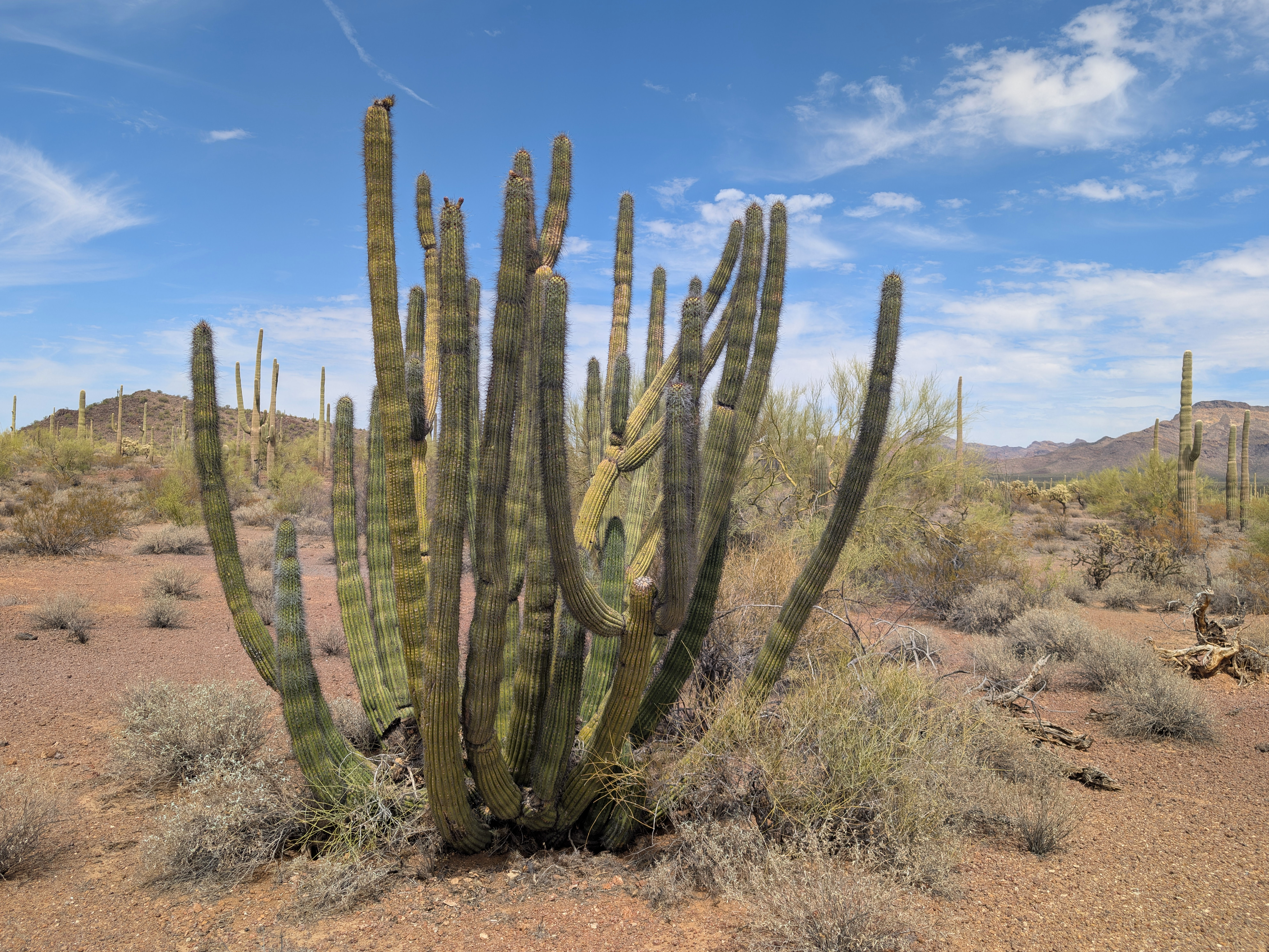
Stenocereus thurberi in Tillotson Peak Wayside in Organ Pipe Cactus Wilderness, Arizona

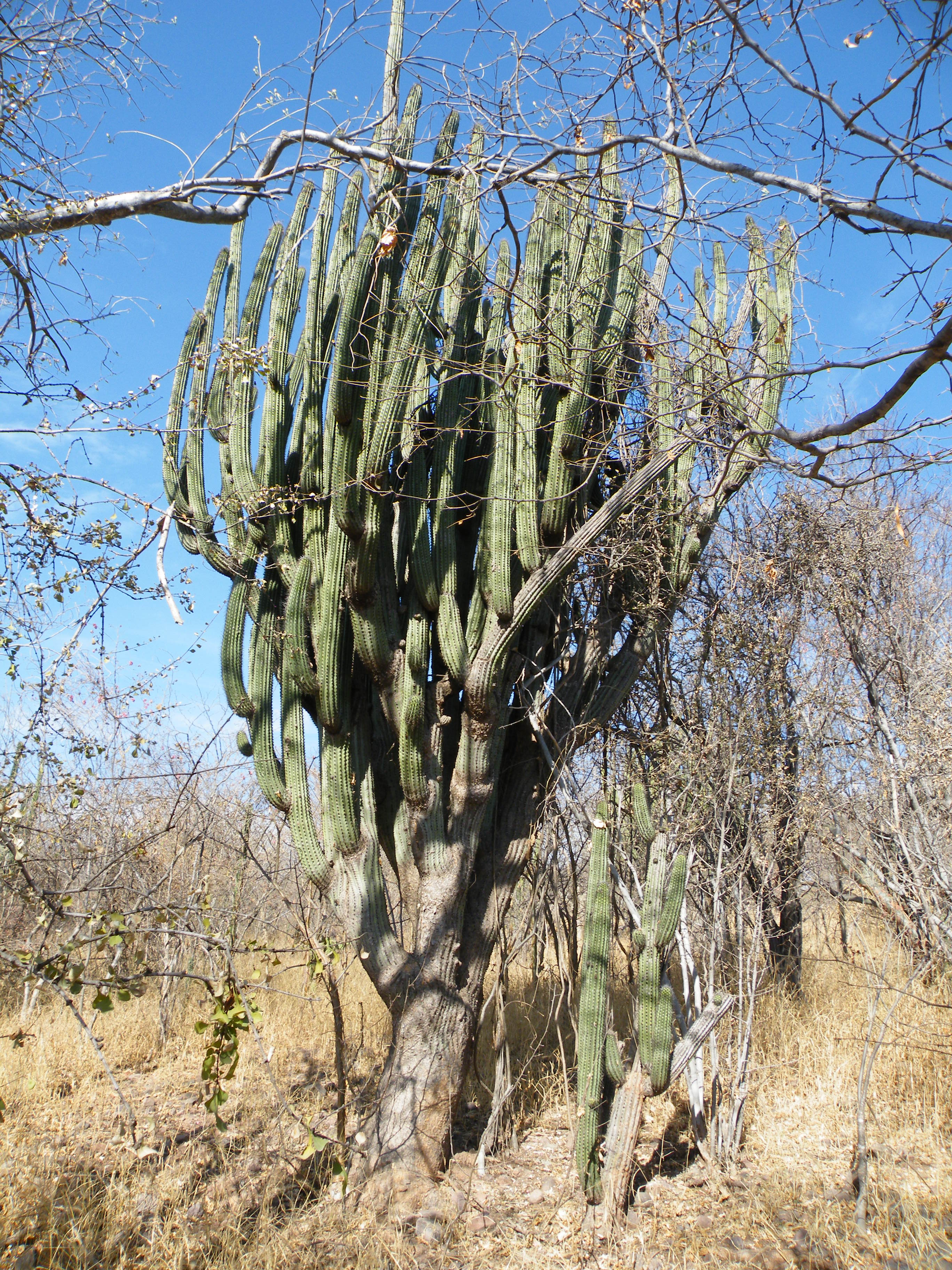
Adult plant growing in Guamuchil, Sinaloa

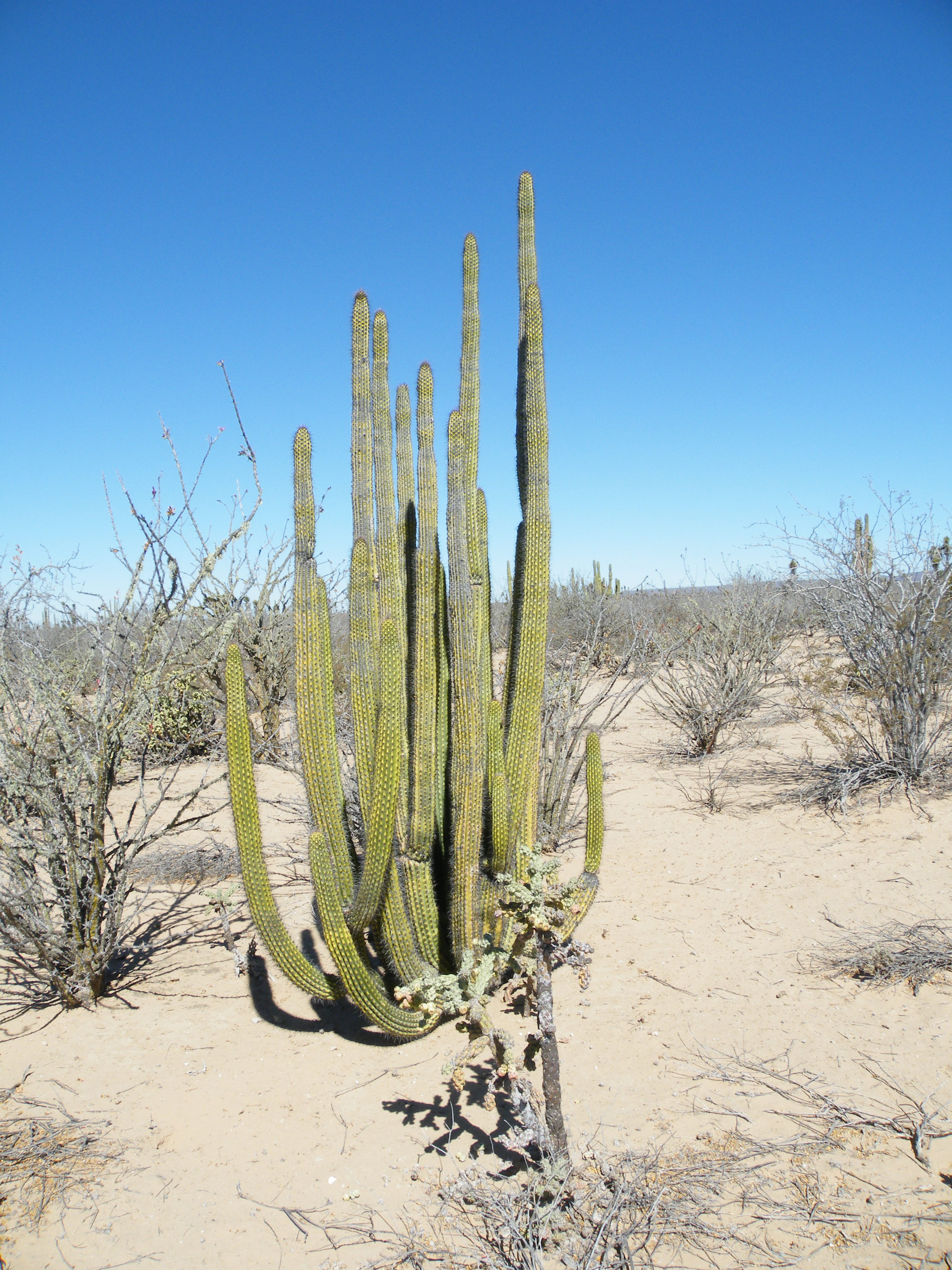
Habitat in Viscaino, Baja California Sur

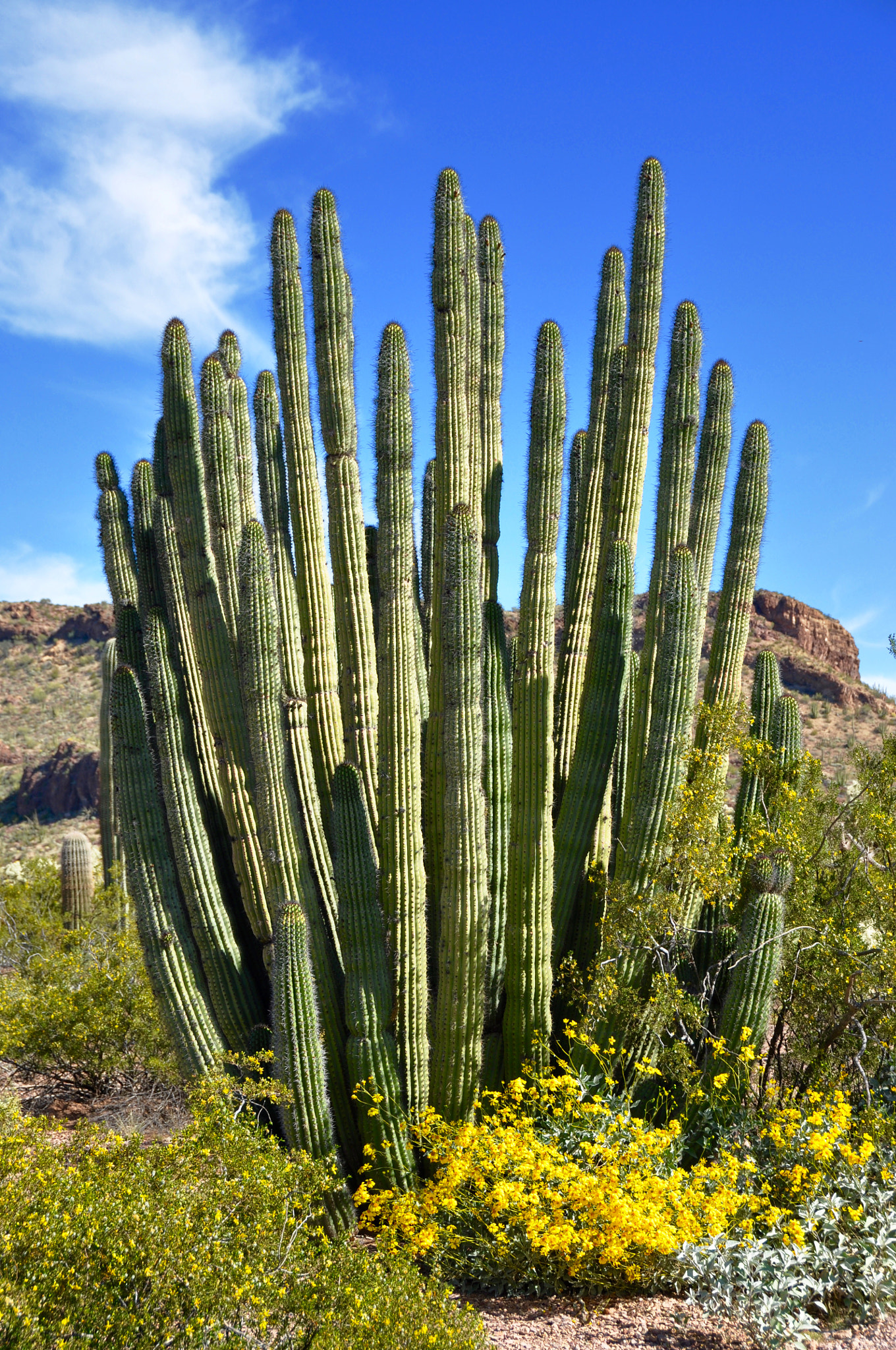
Plant growing in habitat along with Encelia farinosa in Ajo Mountain drive, Organ Pipe Cactus National Monument

== Taxonomy ==
George Engelmann first described this species as Cereus thurberi in 1854. In 1961 Franz Buxbaum placed the species in the genus Stenocereus. Its English common name is derived from its resemblance to a pipe organ. It is locally known as pitaya dulce, Spanish for "sweet pitaya" or sweet cactus fruit.

== See also ==
- Organ Pipe Cactus National Monument
