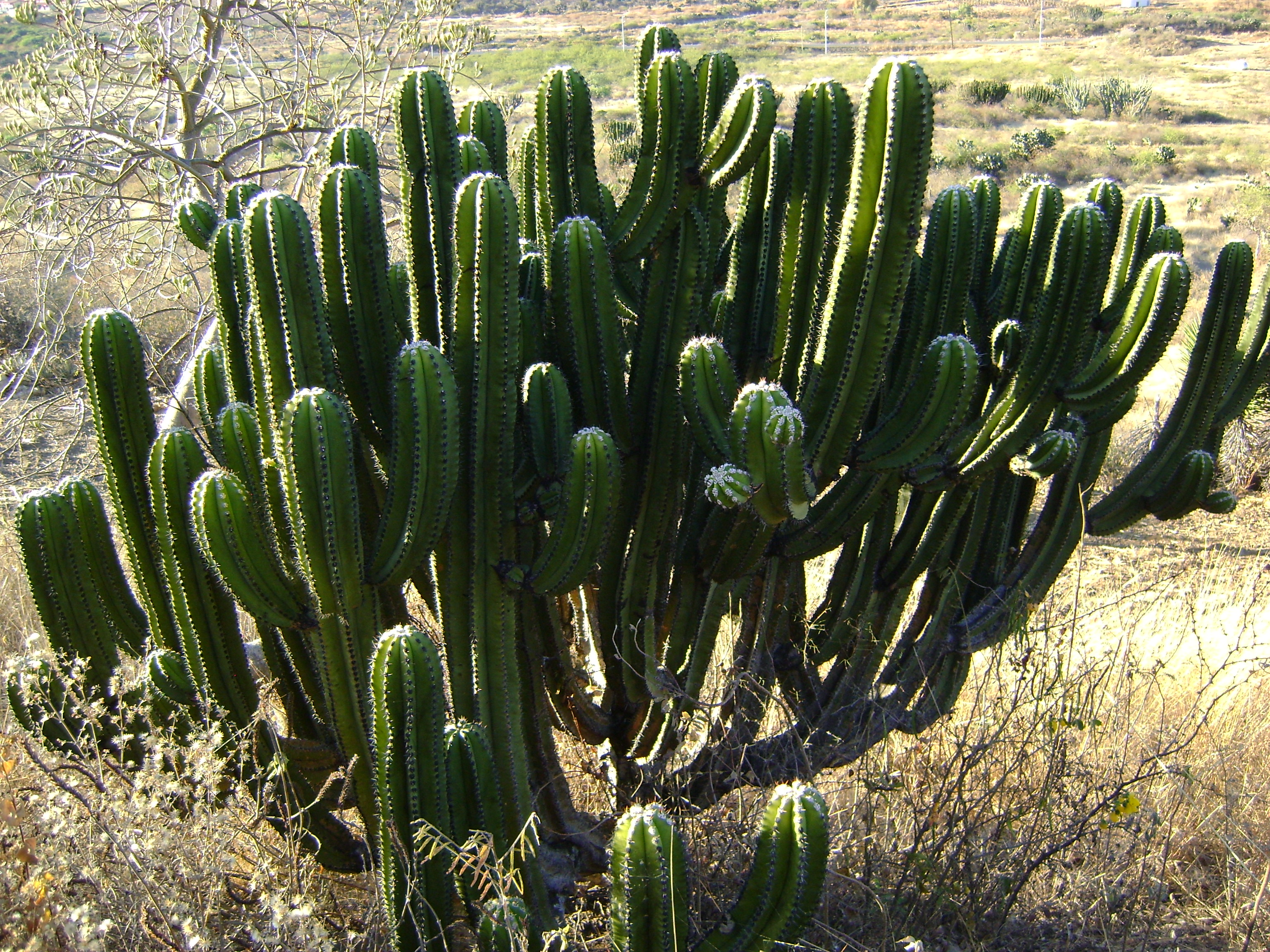

Conservation status
- Least Concern (IUCN 3.1)

Scientific classification
- Kingdom: Plantae
- Clade: Tracheophytes
- Clade: Angiosperms
- Clade: Eudicots
- Order: Caryophyllales
- Family: Cactaceae
- Subfamily: Cactoideae
- Genus: Myrtillocactus
- Species: M. schenckii

Binomial name
- Myrtillocactus schenckii (J.A.Purpus) Britton & Rose

= Myrtillocactus schenckii =

Species of cactus

Myrtillocactus schenckii, also known as garambullo or vichishovo, is a species of cacti native to Oaxaca and Puebla, Mexico. Placed in the genus Myrtillocactus, it is a member of the large and diverse family Cactaceae.

== Description ==
Arborescent, erect cactus, up to 2–7 m (6 ft 7 in – 23 ft 0 in) tall. The main stem is short, with branches up to 10 cm (3.9 in) wide, shaped like a "chandelier", much branched near the base of the trunk, stems 6–12 cm (2.4–4.7 in) in diameter, with 6–8 ribs, bluish-green. Radial spines, whose length is from 0.5 to 1.2 cm (0.20 to 0.47 in) and from 0.5 to 0.8 mm (0.020 to 0.031 in) wide, ending in a point at the top, straight, rigid, black and greyish. Central spine between 1 and sometimes absent, between 1–5 cm (0.39–1.97 in) long and between 0.8 and 1 mm (0.031 and 0.039 in) wide, grayish or black in color and straight. Flowers, axillary, to 3.5 cm (1.4 in) wide and 3 cm (1.2 in) broad, yellowish-green to yellowish-white. Fruits, red, globose or ellipsiodal, 8–15 mm (0.31–0.59 in) in diameter, sometimes with a few weak spines. Juicy red to brown pulp. Asymmetric, oval seed 1.1 to 1.5 mm (0.043 to 0.059 in) long by 8 to 1.2 mm (0.315 to 0.047 in) wide, black in color and wrinkled in appearance.

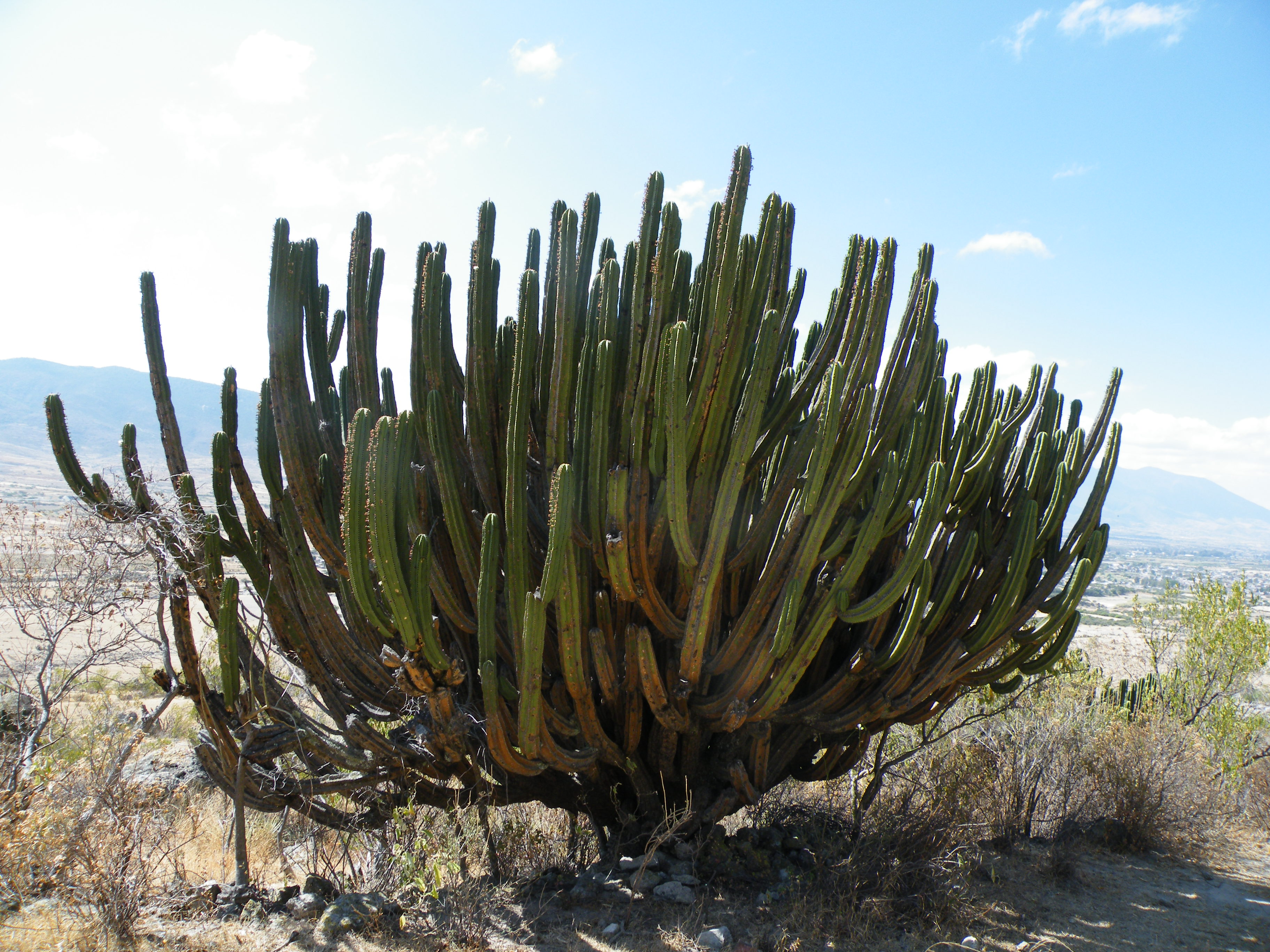
Adult plant

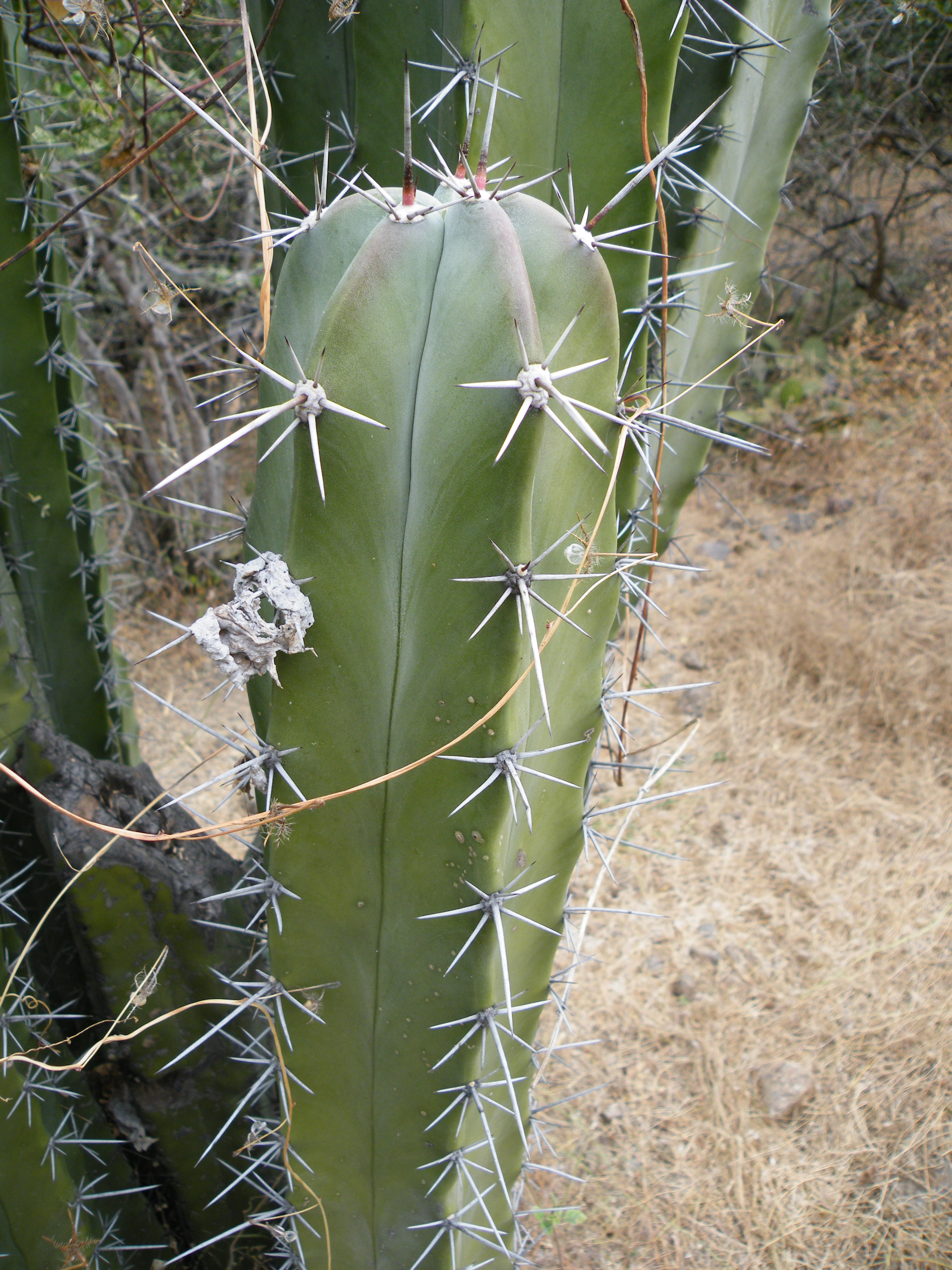
Spines

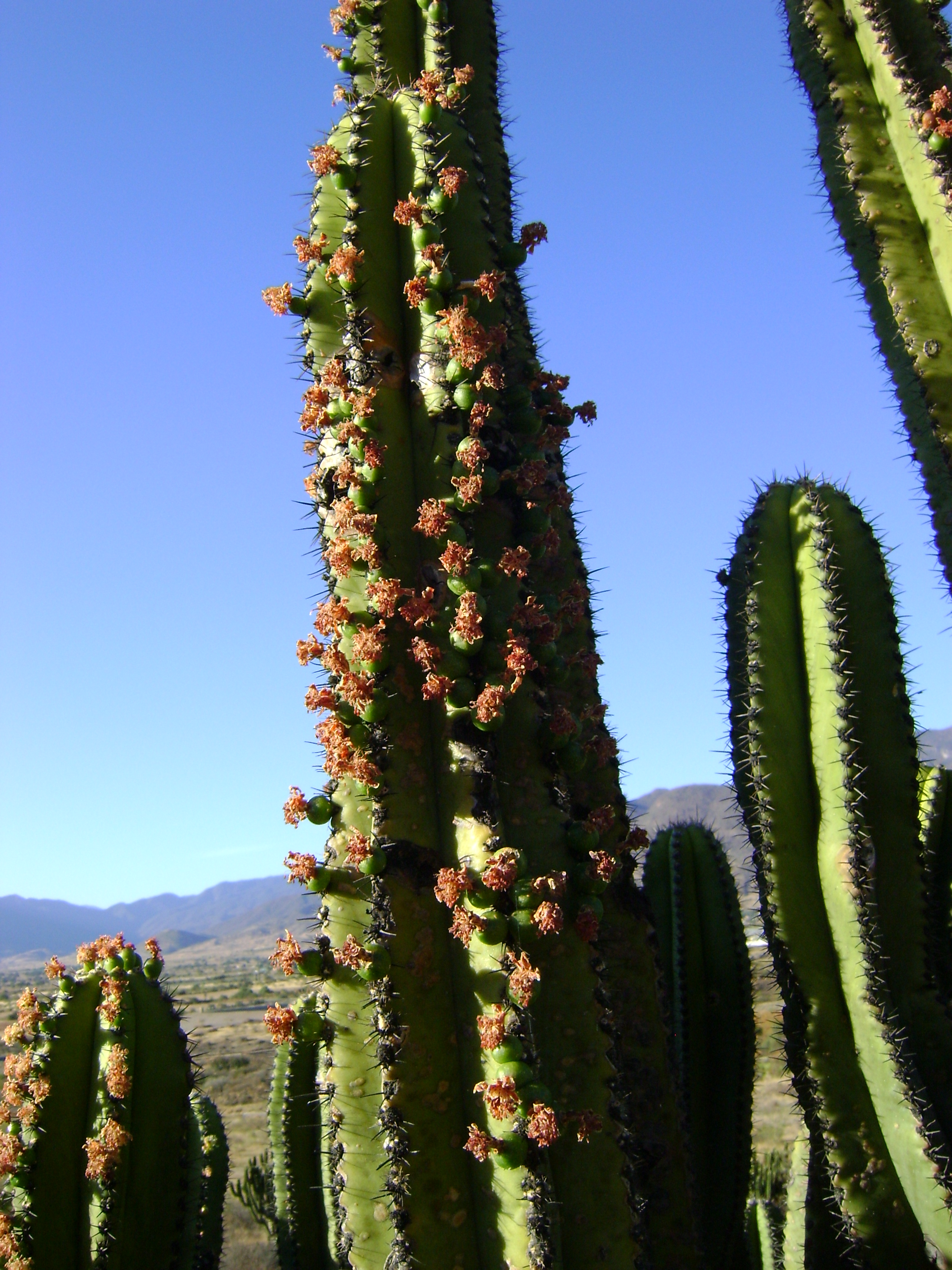
Fruit

Flowers

== Distribution and habitat ==
This species has a distribution restricted to the states of Chiapas, Oaxaca and Puebla. Outside of Mexico, it has been registered in Guatemala. This species is characteristic of the xeric scrublands and transition areas with low deciduous forest. This species is characteristic of arid and semi-arid climate, they are generally found in gypsum and limestone soils, often with high salt content, as is the case in the Tehuacán-Cuicatlán valley. It is distributed in an altitudinal range of 1,300 to 2,000 m (4,300 to 6,600 ft). The places where the species is distributed, present a dry, arid, semi-warm climate, with a marked wet season in the summer, where the average annual rainfall is between 380 and 450 mm (15 and 18 in) and its average temperature throughout the year is of 21.2 °C (70.2 °F).

== Taxonomy ==
The first description as Cereus schenckii was published in 1909 by Joseph Anton Purpus. The specific epithet schenckii honors the German botanist Heinrich Schenck. Nathaniel Lord Britton and Joseph Nelson Rose placed the species in the genus Myrtillocactus in the same year
