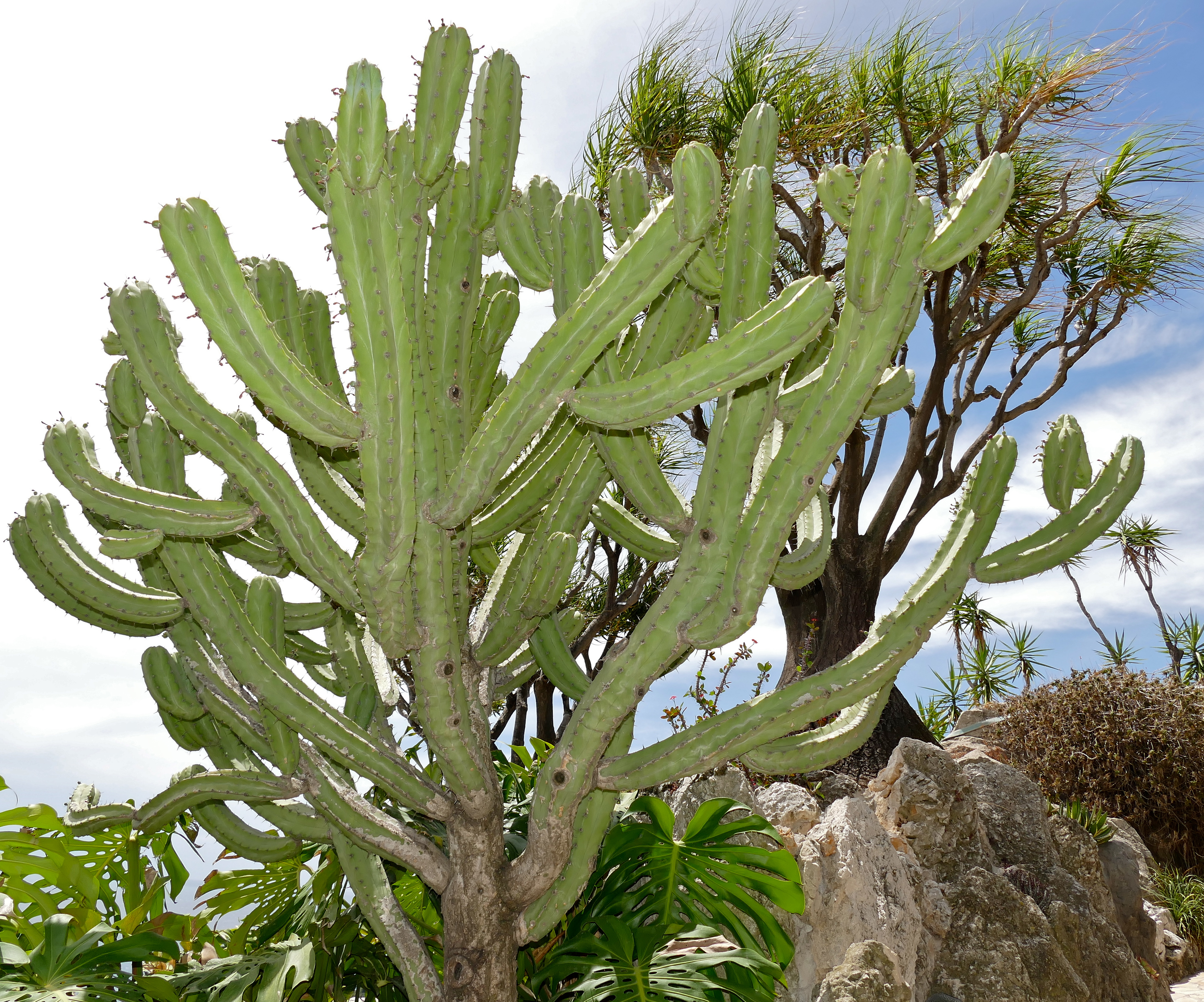

Scientific classification
- Kingdom: Plantae
- Clade: Embryophytes
- Clade: Tracheophytes
- Clade: Spermatophytes
- Clade: Angiosperms
- Clade: Eudicots
- Order: Caryophyllales
- Family: Cactaceae
- Subfamily: Cactoideae
- Genus: Myrtillocactus
- Species: M. geometrizans

Binomial name
- Myrtillocactus geometrizans (Mart.) Console

= Myrtillocactus geometrizans =

Species of cactus

Myrtillocactus geometrizans (bilberry cactus, whortleberry cactus, blue myrtle cactus, or blue candle) is a species of cactus in the genus Myrtillocactus, native to central and northern Mexico.

== Description ==
Myrtillocactus geometrizans is a large shrubby cactus growing to 4–5 m tall, with candelabra-like branching on mature plants. The individual stems are 6–10 cm diameter, with five (occasionally six) ribs, with areoles spaced 1.5–3 cm apart. The flowers are creamy white, 2–2.5 cm diameter. They last less than one day. The fruit is an edible dark purple berry 1–2 cm diameter, superficially resembling Vaccinium myrtillus (bilberry or whortleberry) fruit; both the scientific and English names derive from this resemblance.

== Cultivation ==
It is a popular species in cultivation, where young plants commonly remain unbranched for many years. The fruit is edible and sold for consumption in Mexico.

The bilberry cactus is fast growing, and is often used as grafting stock because of this. With favourable conditions it can reach heights of up to 15 feet.

The fukurokuryuzinboku (福禄竜神木) cultivar from Japan, commonly known as "titty cactus" or "breast cactus," has unusually plump ribs shaped like human breasts. Fukurokuryuzinboku, roughly translates to fortune (fuku), fief/happy (roku), dragon (ryu), Shinto god/spirit (jin), tree (boku). It was named after Fukurokuju and Ryujin, two of the Seven Lucky Gods in Japanese mythology.

The glorp cultivar discovered in 2020 has an alien looking stem with mutated ribs. It is a very popular clone of myrtillocactus that has been mass propagated via grafting. This cultivar also commonly fasciates or crests.

== Gallery ==
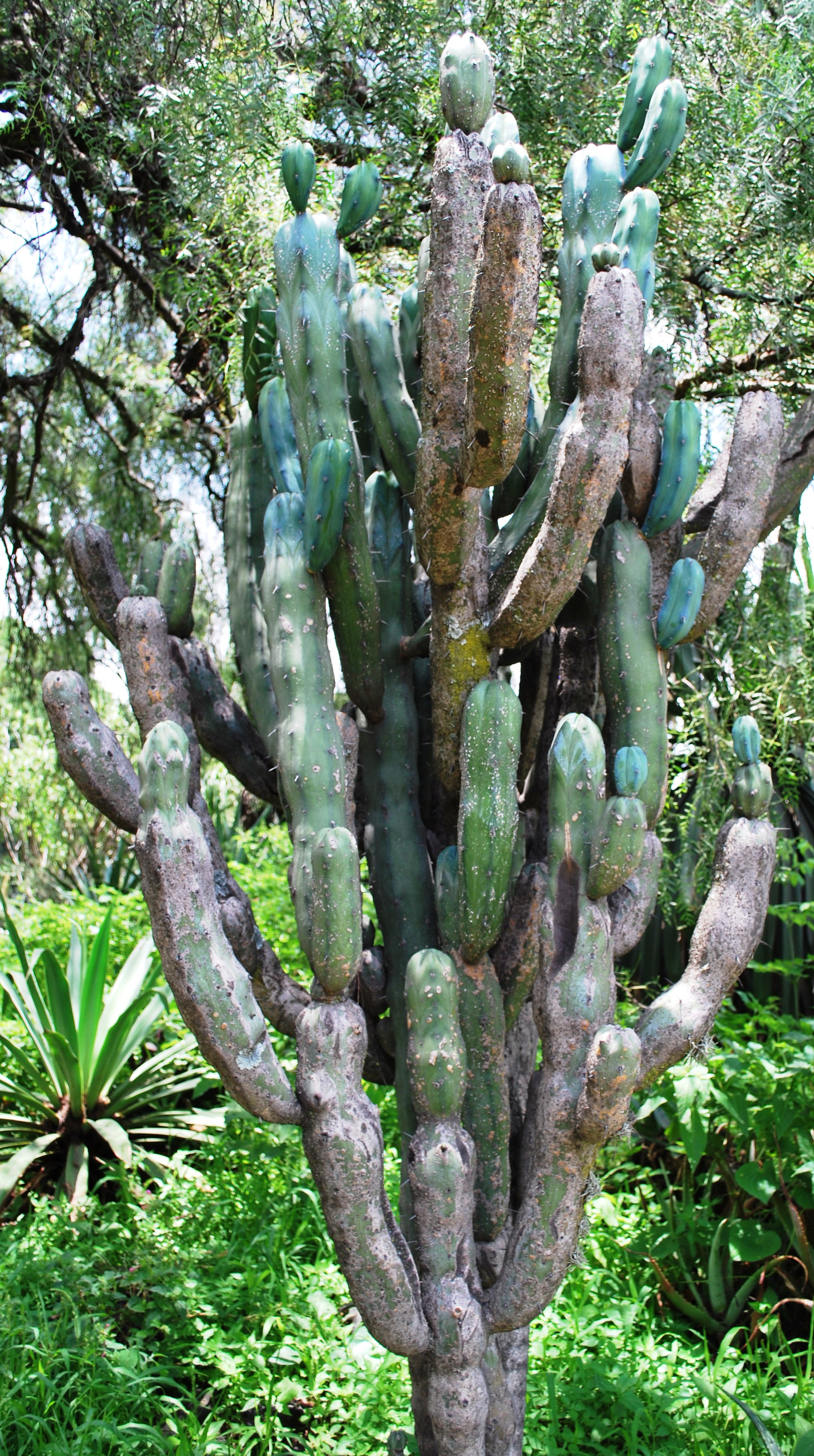
Myrtillocactus geometrizans in UNAM Botanical Garden, Mexico City

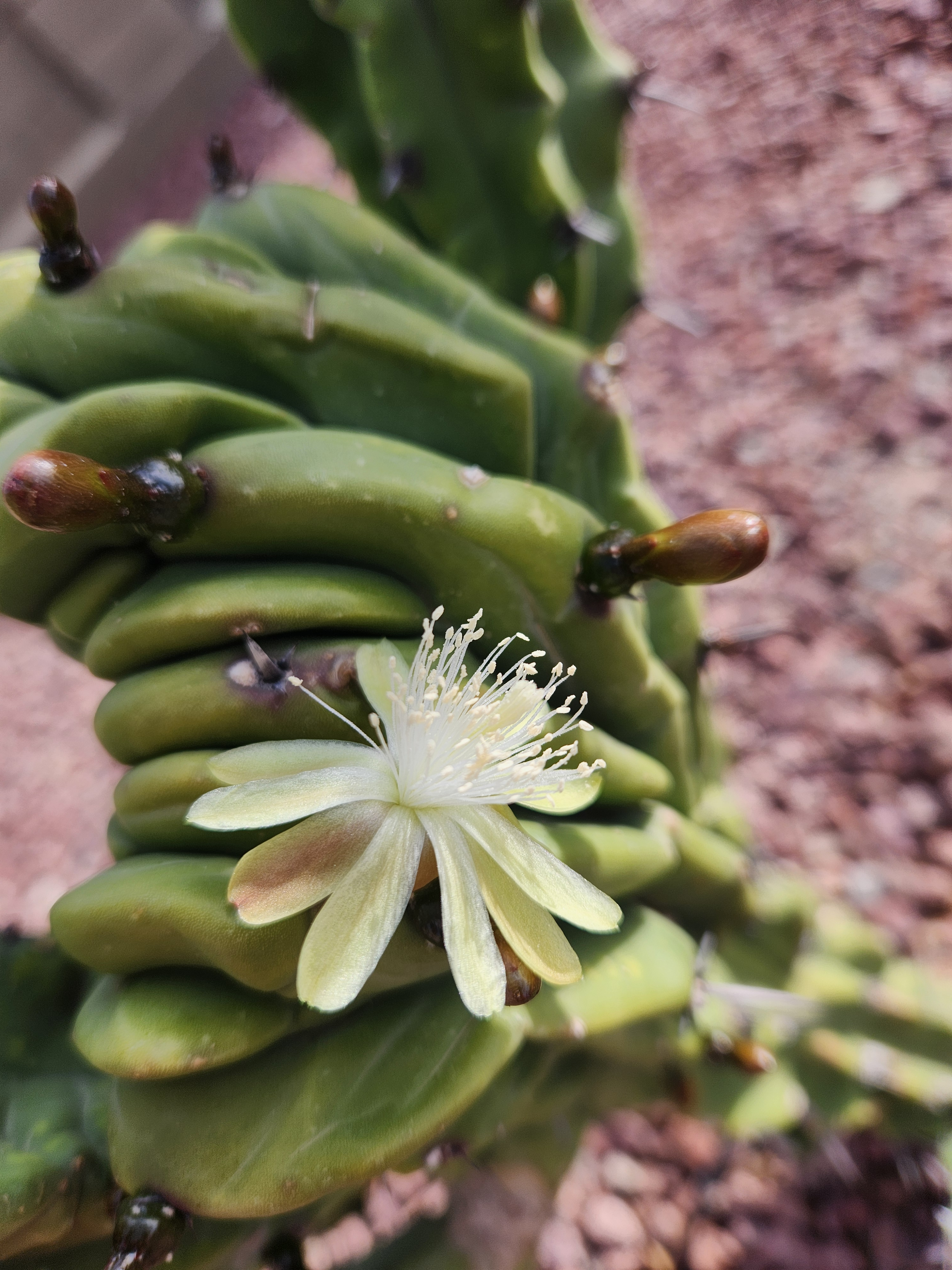
Blossom and berry

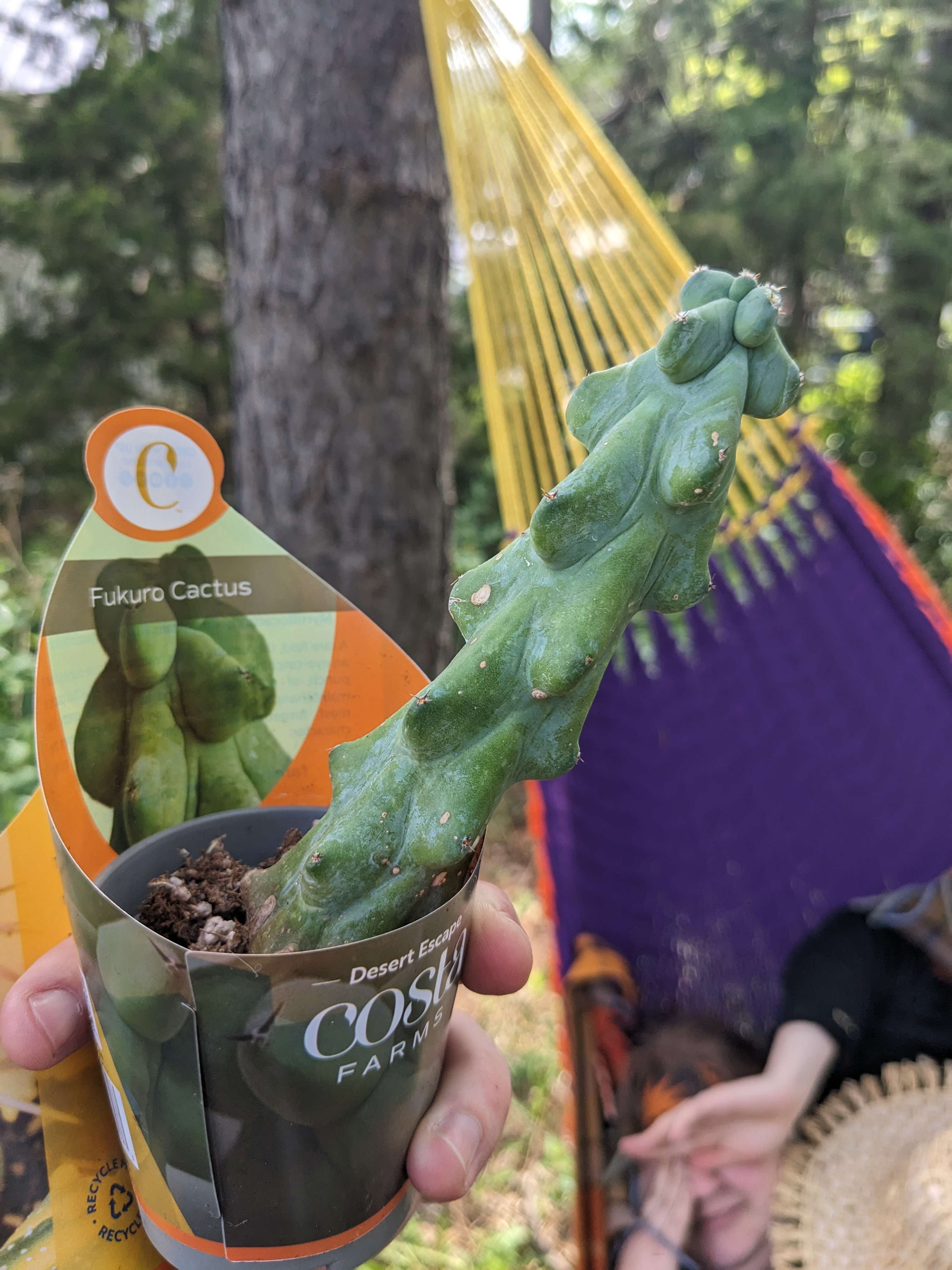
'Fukurokuryuzinboku' cultivar, commonly known as the "boob cactus"
