= Pitaya (Stenocereus) =

Fruit of a cactus

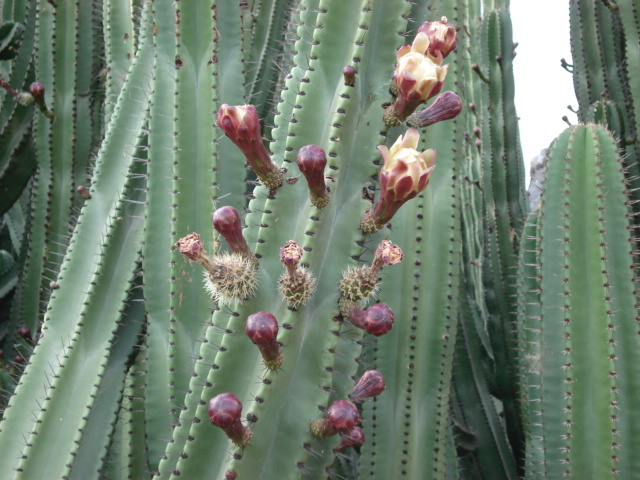
Pitaya (Stenocereus queretaroensis)

The pitaya, also known as coapetilla, is a fruit of the genus Stenocereus from the family Cactaceae, coming from the columnar cactus with the same name. It is related to the dragon fruit, also called pitaya, in the same family but in the genus Selenicereus. According to Eulogio Pimienta-Barrios, "The name pitaya originated in the Antilles and meant scaly fruit." Stemming from pre-Hispanic times, the old Aztec name "Coapetilla" (lit. transl. thick serpent) refers to pitaya, but its usage has declined.

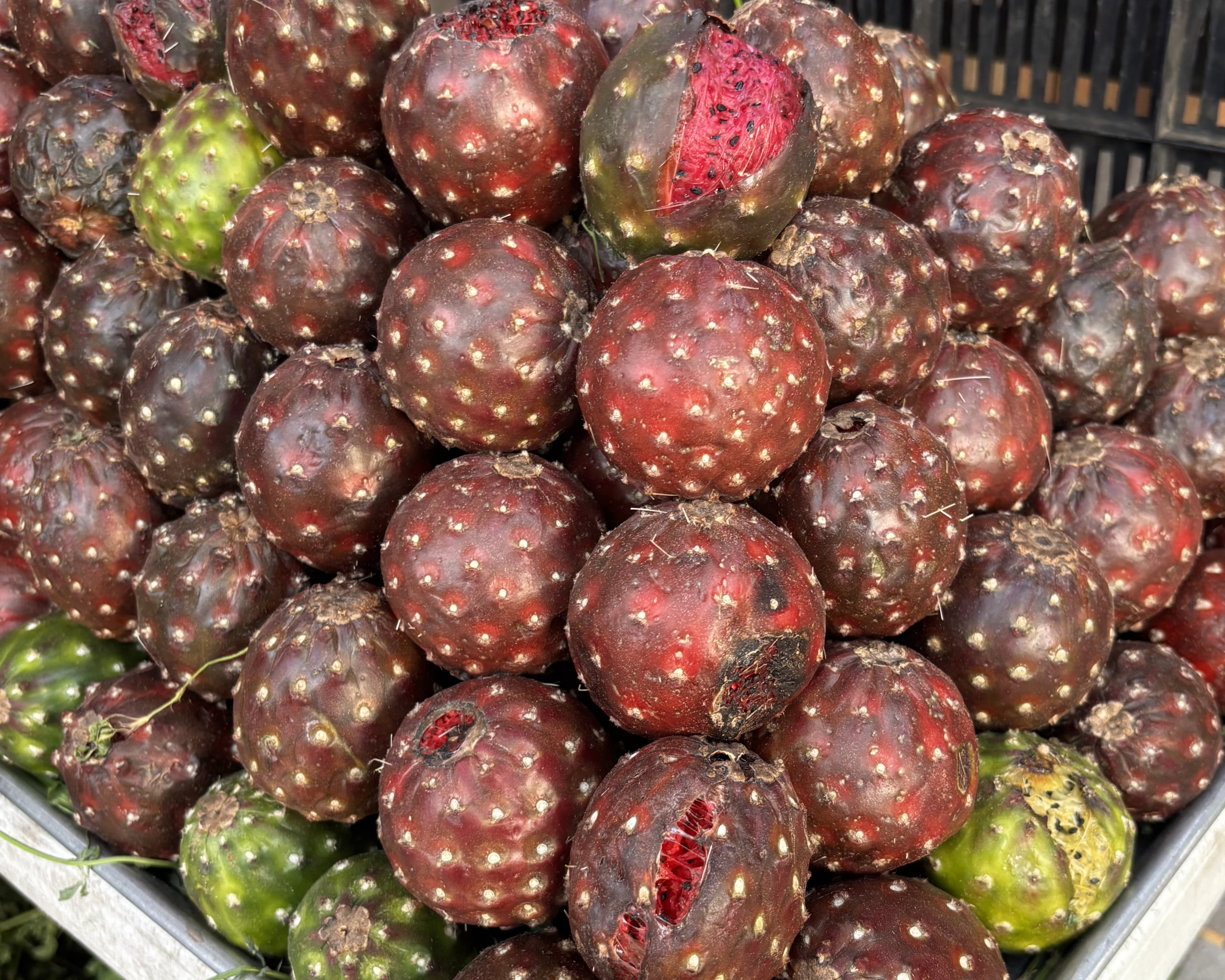
Pitaya fruits

== Cultivation ==
It is grown as an ornamental plant and an agricultural plant for its fruit.

== Range ==
Although this fruit and cactus is known as "pitaya" in Mexico, this group of cacti are distributed from Arizona in the US, Mexico, Central America, to the north of South America in Venezuela and Colombia.

== Species ==
One of the most well known species is Stenocereus thurberi, called "pitaya dulce" (transl. sweet pitaya) (in the northeast of Mexico, especially in Sinaloa and Sonora), with a reddish skin and a red-cherry pulp. However, many other species of the genus Stenocereus are enjoyed in other parts of Mexico, such as Stenocereus pruinosus, S. griseus, S. queretaroensis, and S. stellatus along with others.

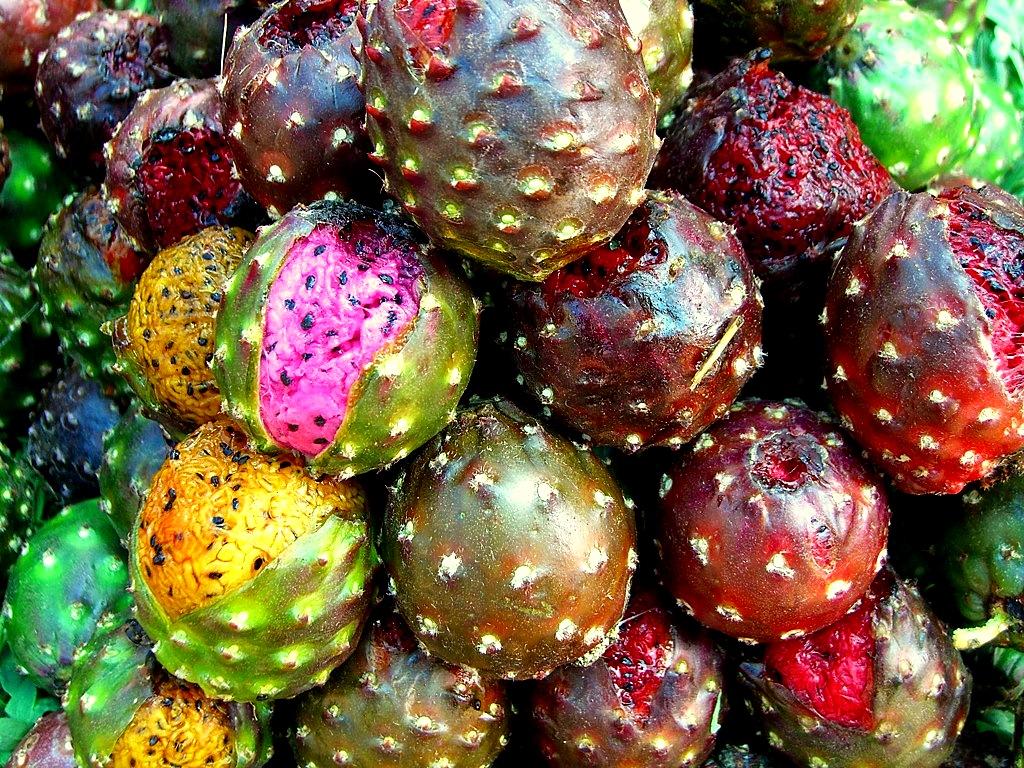
Variety of the coloration of the fruit.

== Properties ==
The pitaya has antioxidants, ascorbic acid, and phenols. It is rich in Vitamin C, and also has vitamins in group B, and minerals like calcium, phosphorus, iron, as well as high water content, vegetable protein, and soluble fiber. The pigments in the pitaya that give it its range of colors have antioxidants, like carotenoids, flavonoids, and betalains. They also have anti-inflammatory properties."

Stenocereus thurberi ranges from 78-84% water, with 34.4 to 38.0 grams of fiber per kilogram. The sugars go from 8.1 g/100g to 15.5g/100g. It has minerals such as nitrogen, phosphorus, potassium, calcium, magnesium, sodium, iron, manganese, zinc and copper.

== See also ==
- Dragon fruit
