= Pilocereus =

There are two genera of cacti for which the name Pilocereus has been used:

- Pilocereus sensu K.Schum. non Lem., an illegitimate name for Pilosocereus
- Pilocereus Lem., an illegitimate name for Cephalocereus
