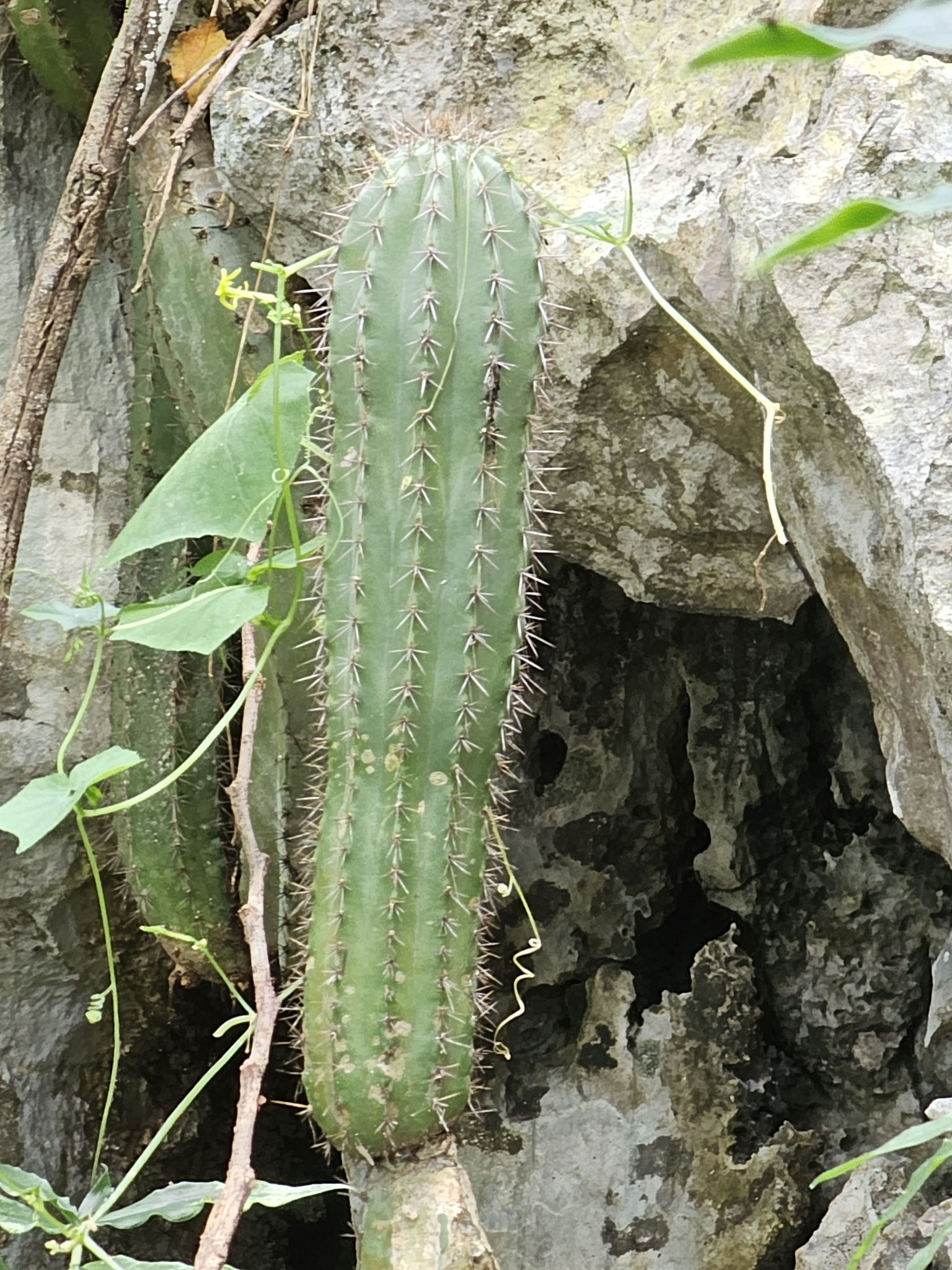

Conservation status
- Least Concern (IUCN 3.1)

Scientific classification
- Kingdom: Plantae
- Clade: Tracheophytes
- Clade: Angiosperms
- Clade: Eudicots
- Order: Caryophyllales
- Family: Cactaceae
- Subfamily: Cactoideae
- Genus: Cephalocereus
- Species: C. apicicephalium

Binomial name
- Cephalocereus apicicephalium E.Y.Dawson

Synonyms
- Neodawsonia apicicephalium (E.Y.Dawson) Backeb. 1949; Cephalocereus nizandensis (Bravo & T.MacDoug.) Buxb. 1965; Cephalocereus totolapensis (Bravo & T.MacDoug.) Buxb. 1965; Neodawsonia apicicephalium subsp. totolapensis Guiggi 2020; Neodawsonia guengolensis Bravo 1959; Neodawsonia nana Bravo 1959; Neodawsonia nizandensis Bravo & T.MacDoug. 1959; Neodawsonia totolapensis Bravo & T.MacDoug. 1959

= Cephalocereus apicicephalium =

Species of cactus

Cephalocereus apicicephalium is a species of cactus from Mexico.

== Description ==
Cephalocereus apicicephalium grows with gray-green shoots up to 7 cm (2.8 in) in diameter, is slightly branched at the base or sometimes above it and reaches heights of 1 to 3 meters. There are 22 to 25 narrow ribs. The 1 to 4 downward directed and basally expanded central spines are reddish yellow to black and 2 to 4 cm (0.79 to 1.57 in) long. The 9 to 12 very slender, gray to white marginal spines are 1.5 to 1.8 cm (0.59 to 0.71 in) long. The terminal, woolly pseudocephalium is grown through by the new growth of the next growing season and remains as a woolly ring for several years. It consists of curled hair up to 5 cm (2.0 in) long.

The narrow, bell-shaped flowers are pink with a yellowish tint and are 5 to 6 cm (2.0 to 2.4 in) long and up to 3 cm (1.2 in) in diameter. Their pericarpel is covered with small triangular white scales.

== Distribution ==
Cephalocereus apicicephalium is common on steep limestone cliffs in the Mexican states of Oaxaca and Chiapas.

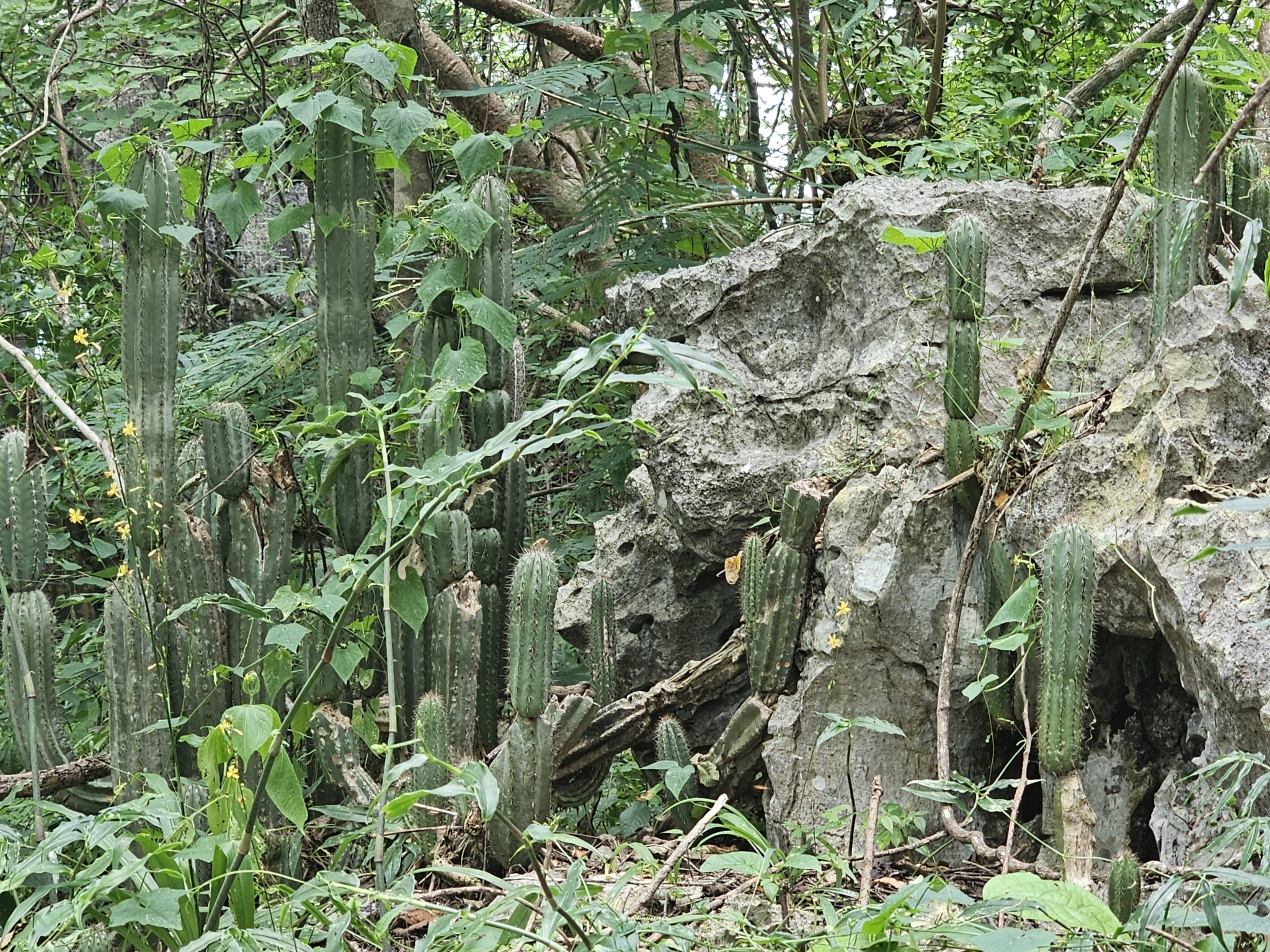
Habitat in Tankah Pakbal, Chiapas, Mexico

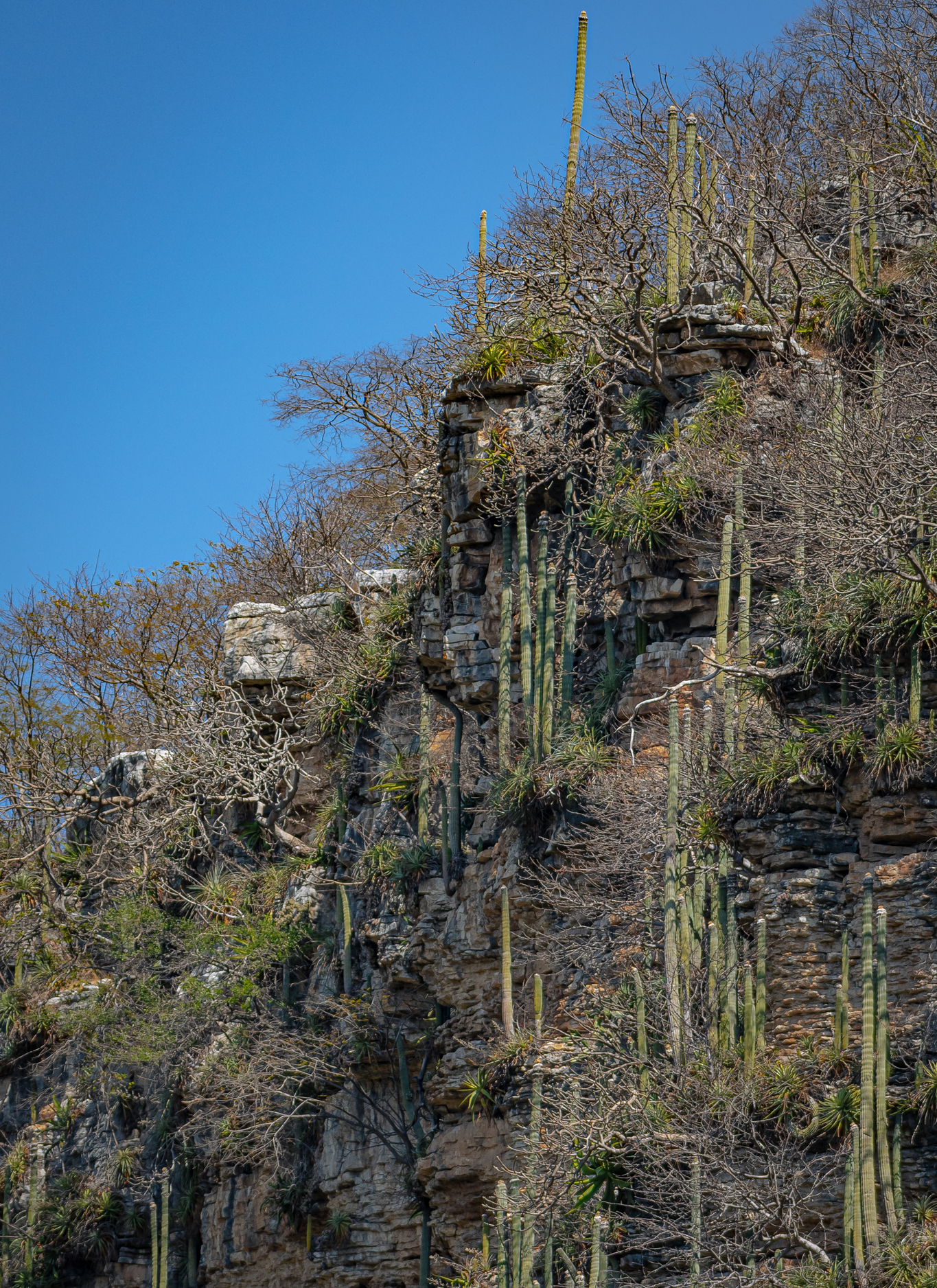
Habitat in Tuxtla Gutiérrez, Chiapas, Mexico

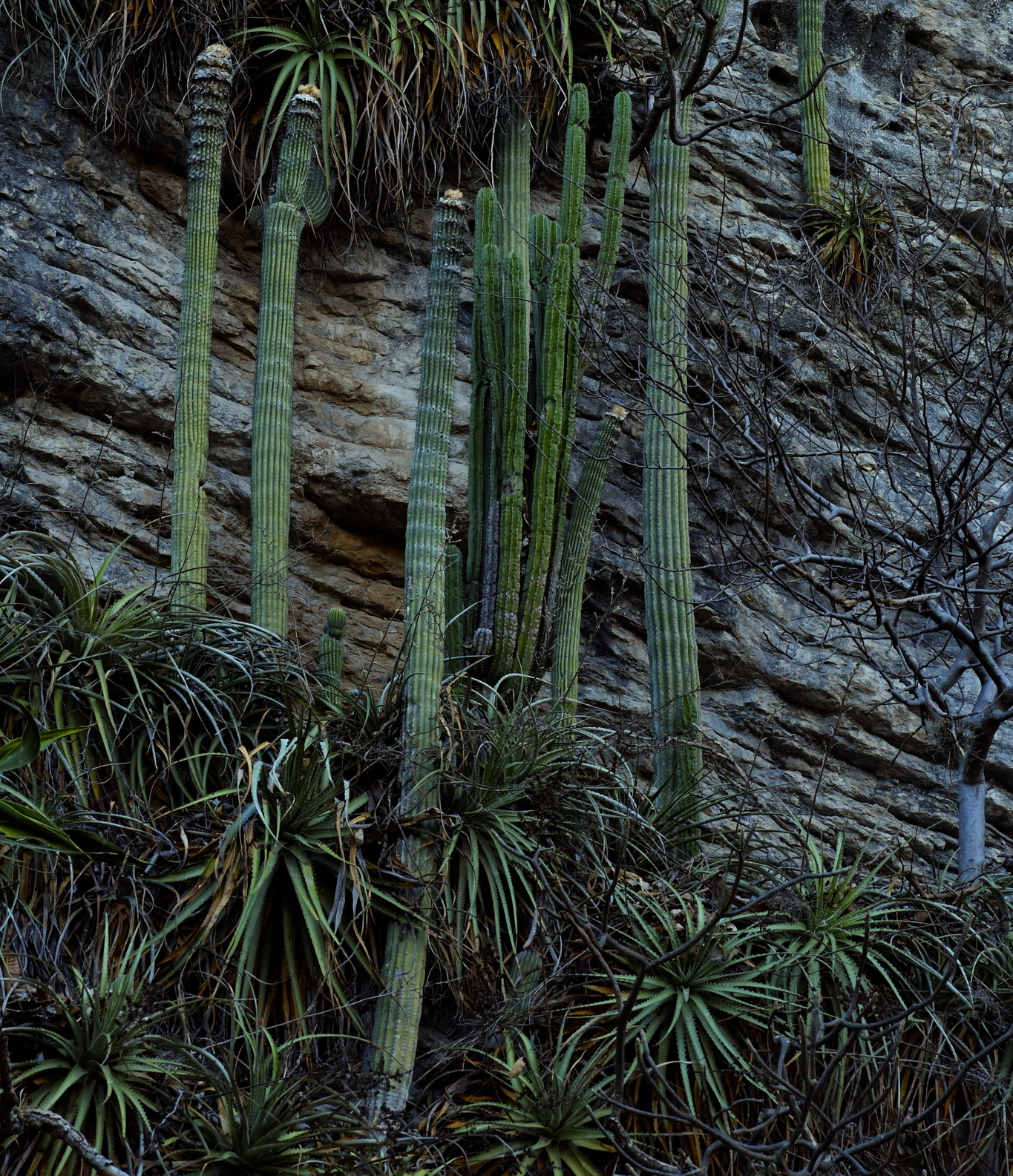
Habitat in Triunfo Agrarista, Chiapas, Mexico

== Taxonomy ==
The first description was published in 1948 by Elmer Yale Dawson. The specific epithet apicicephalium is derived from the Latin word apex for 'tip' and the Greek word kephale for 'head' and refers to the cephalium formed at the tips of the shoots. Two nomenclature synonyms are Neodawsonia apicicephalium (E.Y.Dawson) Backeb (1949) and Neodawsonia totolapensis Bravo & T.MacDoug.(1959).
