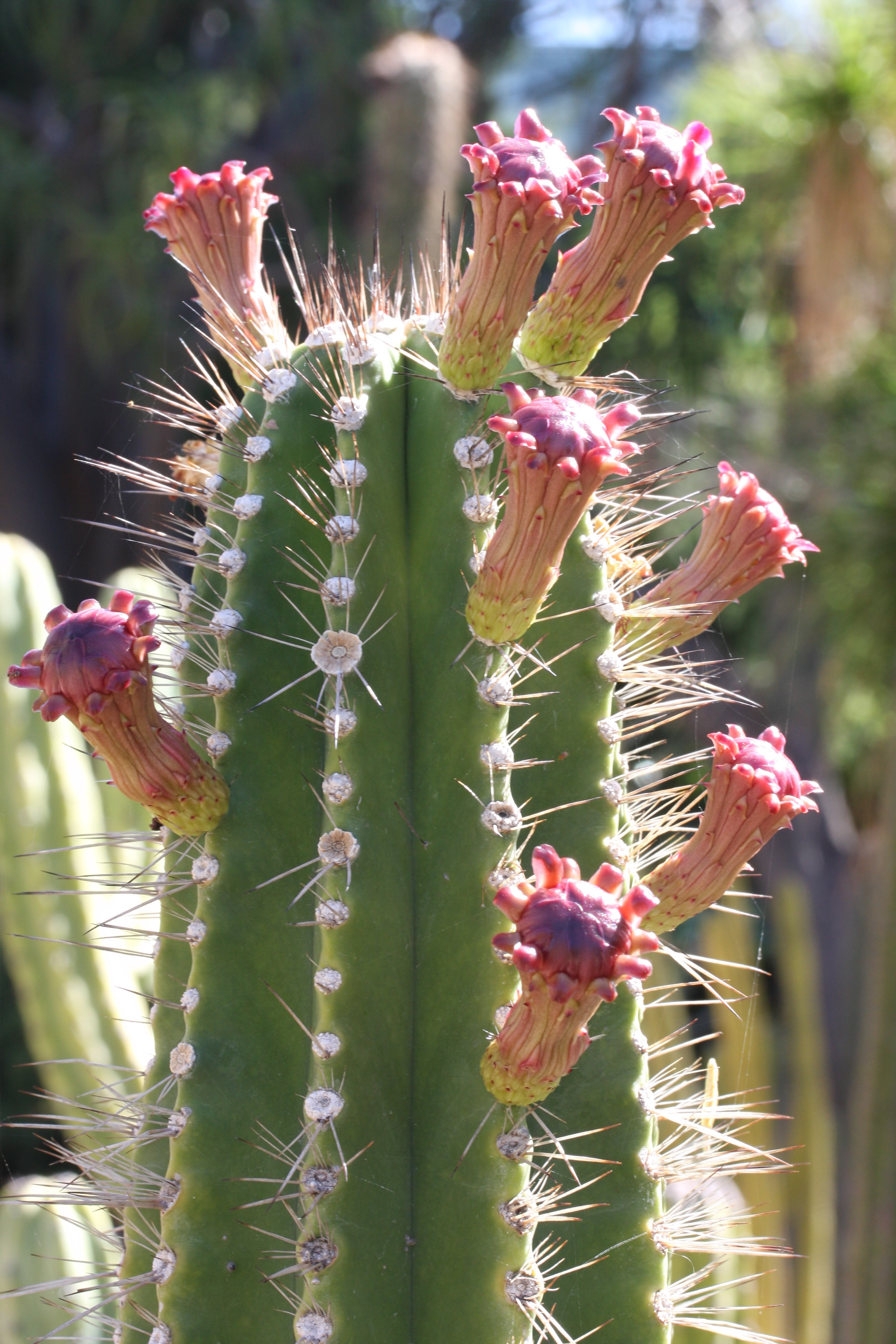

Conservation status
- Vulnerable (IUCN 3.1)

Scientific classification
- Kingdom: Plantae
- Clade: Tracheophytes
- Clade: Angiosperms
- Clade: Eudicots
- Order: Caryophyllales
- Family: Cactaceae
- Subfamily: Cactoideae
- Genus: Cephalocereus
- Species: C. euphorbioides

Binomial name
- Cephalocereus euphorbioides (Haw.) Britton & Rose

Synonyms
- Cactus euphorbioides (Haw.) Spreng. 1825; Carnegiea euphorbioides (Haw.) Backeb. 1944; Cereus euphorbioides Haw. 1819; Lemaireocereus euphorbioides (Haw.) Werderm. 1934; Neobuxbaumia euphorbioides (Haw.) Buxb. 1954; Pilocereus euphorbioides (Haw.) Rümpler 1885; Rooksbya euphorbioides (Haw.) Backeb. 1960; Carnegiea euphorbioides var. olfersii (Salm-Dyck) P.V.Heath 1992; Cereus olfersii Salm-Dyck 1834; Cereus oxygonus Salm-Dyck 1846; Neodawsonia euphorbioides var. olfersii (Salm-Dyck) Backeb. 1960; Rooksbya euphorbioides var. olfersii (Salm-Dyck) Backeb. 1960

= Cephalocereus euphorbioides =

Species of cactus

Cephalocereus euphorbioides is a species of Cephalocereus from Mexico.

== Description ==
Cephalocereus euphorbioides grows with rarely branching green shoots 3 to 5 meters tall and 10 to 11 centimeters in diameter. The 8 to 10 noticeable ribs are clearly wavy. The thorns are only upright in the flower zone and are otherwise more or less horizontal. The single, strong central spine is dark brown and up to 3 centimeters long. The 7 to 9 straight, light gray marginal spines have a darker tip and are 5 to 12 millimeters long.

The narrow, bell-shaped flowers usually appear in large numbers near the tips of the shoots. They are reddish pink, 5 to 8 centimeters long and reach 7 centimeters in diameter. Its pericarpel and floral tube are covered with small tubercles with nectar glands and small scales. The green fruits are up to 8 centimeters long.

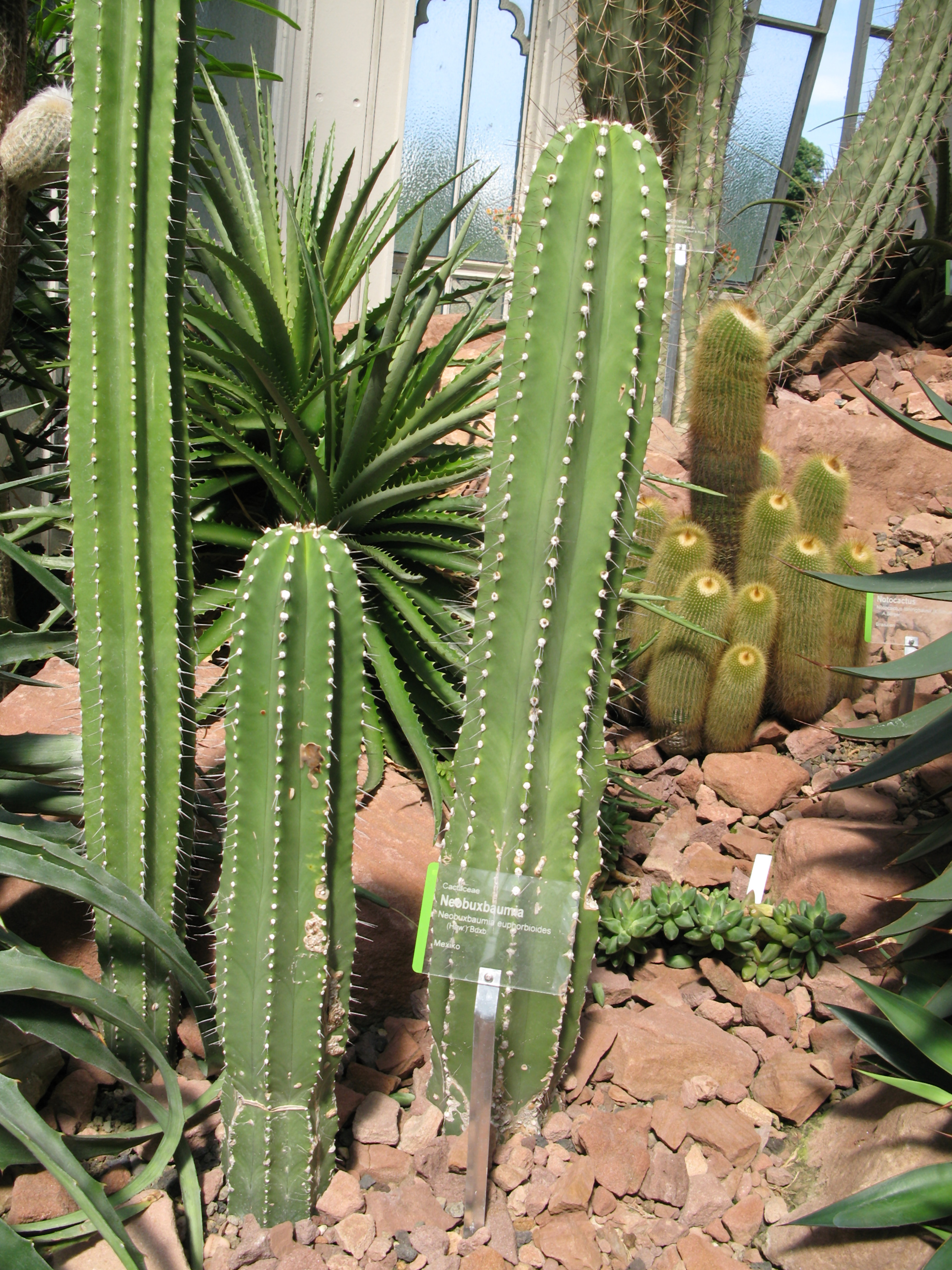
Plant

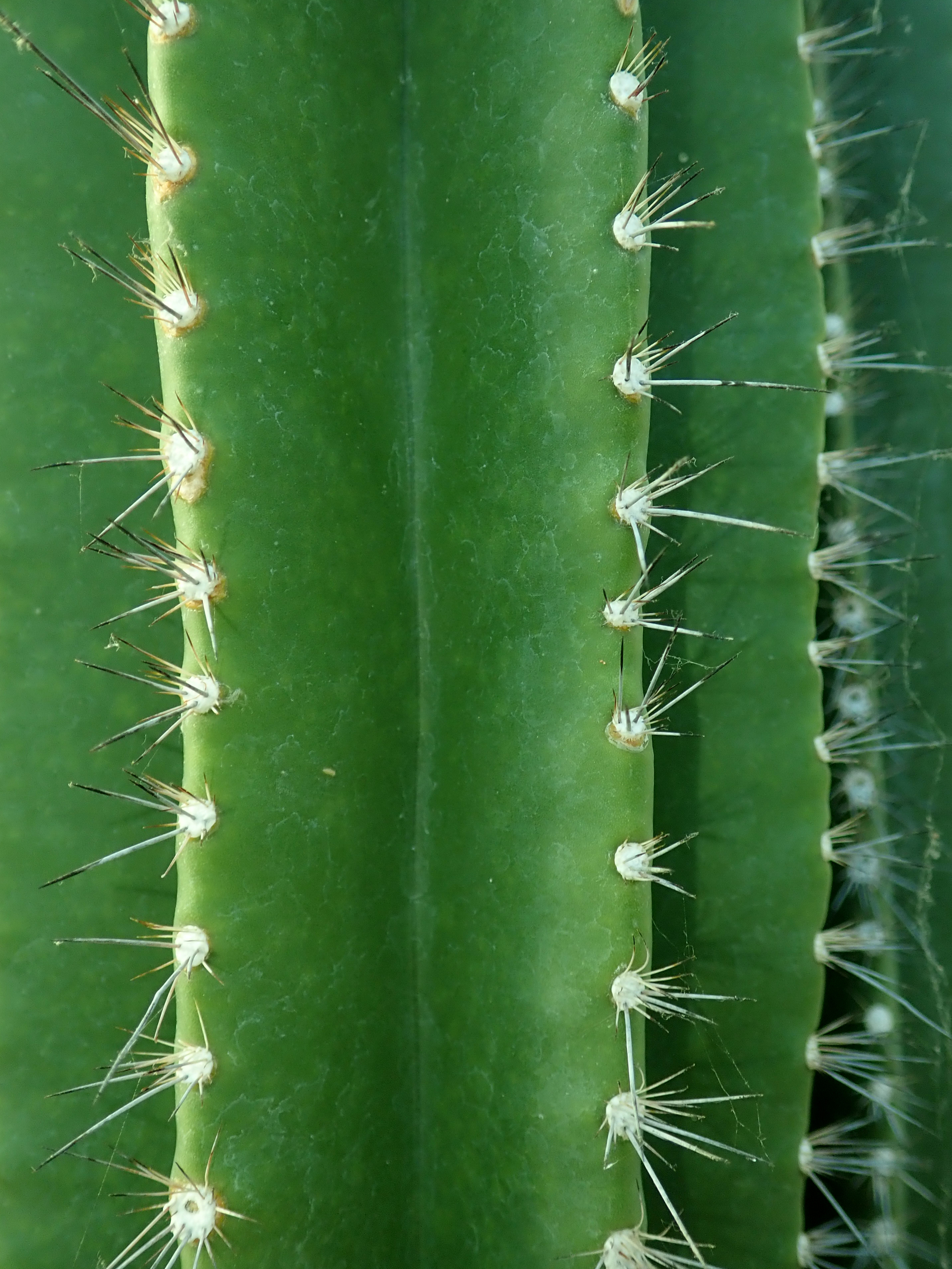
Spines

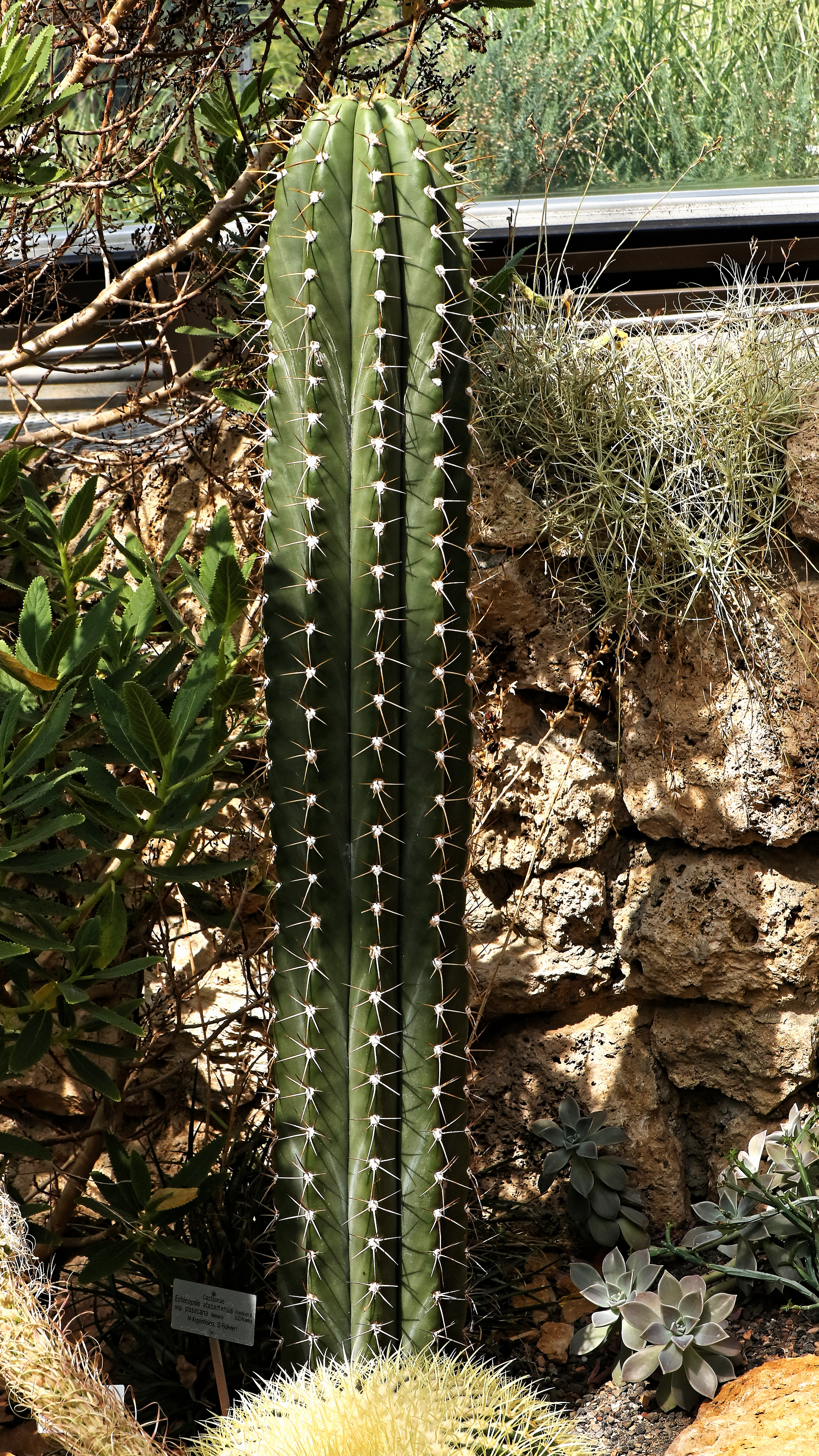

== Distribution ==
Cephalocereus euphorbioides is distributed in the Mexican states of Tamaulipas, San Luis Potosí and Veracruz at elevations between 300 and 600 meters in dry forest. There are two disjunct populations one near Mante, Tamaulipas and the other near Jalapa, Veracruz.

== Taxonomy ==
The first description as Cereus euphorbioides was in 1819 by Adrian Hardy Haworth. The specific epithet euphorbioides is derived from the Greek word -oides for 'similar' and the genus 'Euphorbia'. Nathaniel Lord Britton and Joseph Nelson Rose placed the species in the genus Cephalocereus in 1920. Further nomenclature synonyms are Cactus euphorbioides (Haw.) Spreng. (1825), Pilocereus euphorbioides (Haw.) Rümpler (1886), Lemaireocereus euphorbioides (Haw.) Werderm. (1934), Carnegiea euphorbioides (Haw.) Backeb. (1944), Neobuxbaumia euphorbioides (Haw.) Buxb. (1954), Neodawsonia euphorbioides (Haw.) Buxb. (1957) and Rooksbya euphorbioides (Haw.) Backeb. (1960).
