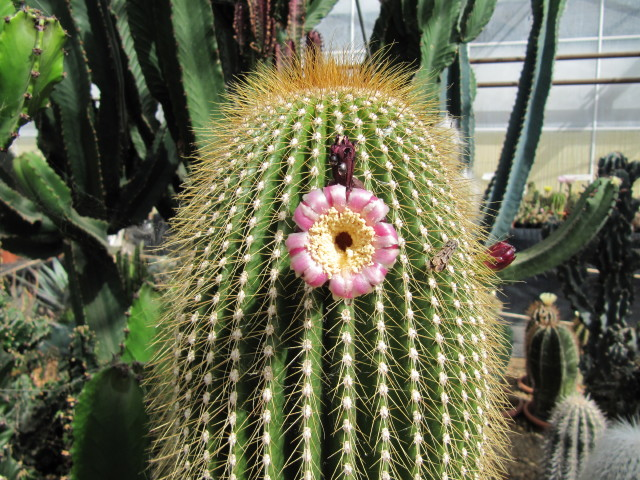

Conservation status
- Vulnerable (IUCN 3.1)

Scientific classification
- Kingdom: Plantae
- Clade: Tracheophytes
- Clade: Angiosperms
- Clade: Eudicots
- Order: Caryophyllales
- Family: Cactaceae
- Subfamily: Cactoideae
- Genus: Cephalocereus
- Species: C. polylophus

Binomial name
- Cephalocereus polylophus (DC.) Britton & Rose

Synonyms
- Carnegiea polylopha (DC.) D.R.Hunt; Carnegiea polylopha (DC.) P.V.Heath; Cereus polylophus DC.; Neobuxbaumia polylopha (DC.) Backeb.; Pilocereus polylophus (DC.) Salm-Dyck

= Cephalocereus polylophus =

Species of cactus

Cephalocereus polylophus is a species of cactus endemic to Mexico. Often grown under the synonym Neobuxbaumia polylopha, it is popular with cactus growers and reproduces well in cultivation.

== Description ==
Cephalocereus polylophus grows individually and reaches heights of up to 13 m (43 ft) or even 15 m (49 ft) and can grow to weigh many tons. The columnar shoots are initially light green and become darker with age. They have diameters of up to 50 cm (1 ft 8 in). The 22 to 36 (rarely from 10) narrow, slightly curved ribs are separated from each other by a sharp furrow. The single, flexible central spine, which can also be missing, is often shorter than the seven to eight marginal spines. The marginal spines are flexible and 1 to 2 cm (0.4 to 0.8 in) long. They are yellowish to brownish and turn gray with age.

The flowers usually appear in groups near the tips of the shoots. They are dark red, 4 to 6 cm (1.6 to 2.4 in) long and reach a diameter of 30 to 35 mm (1.2 to 1.4 in). Its pericarpel and floral tube are covered with fairly large tubercles and small scales that are glabrous in the axillae. The egg-shaped, green fruits are 24 to 40 mm (0.9 to 1.6 in) long and covered with scales, wool and bristles. The fruits are edible by humans and have a delicate, nutty flavor.

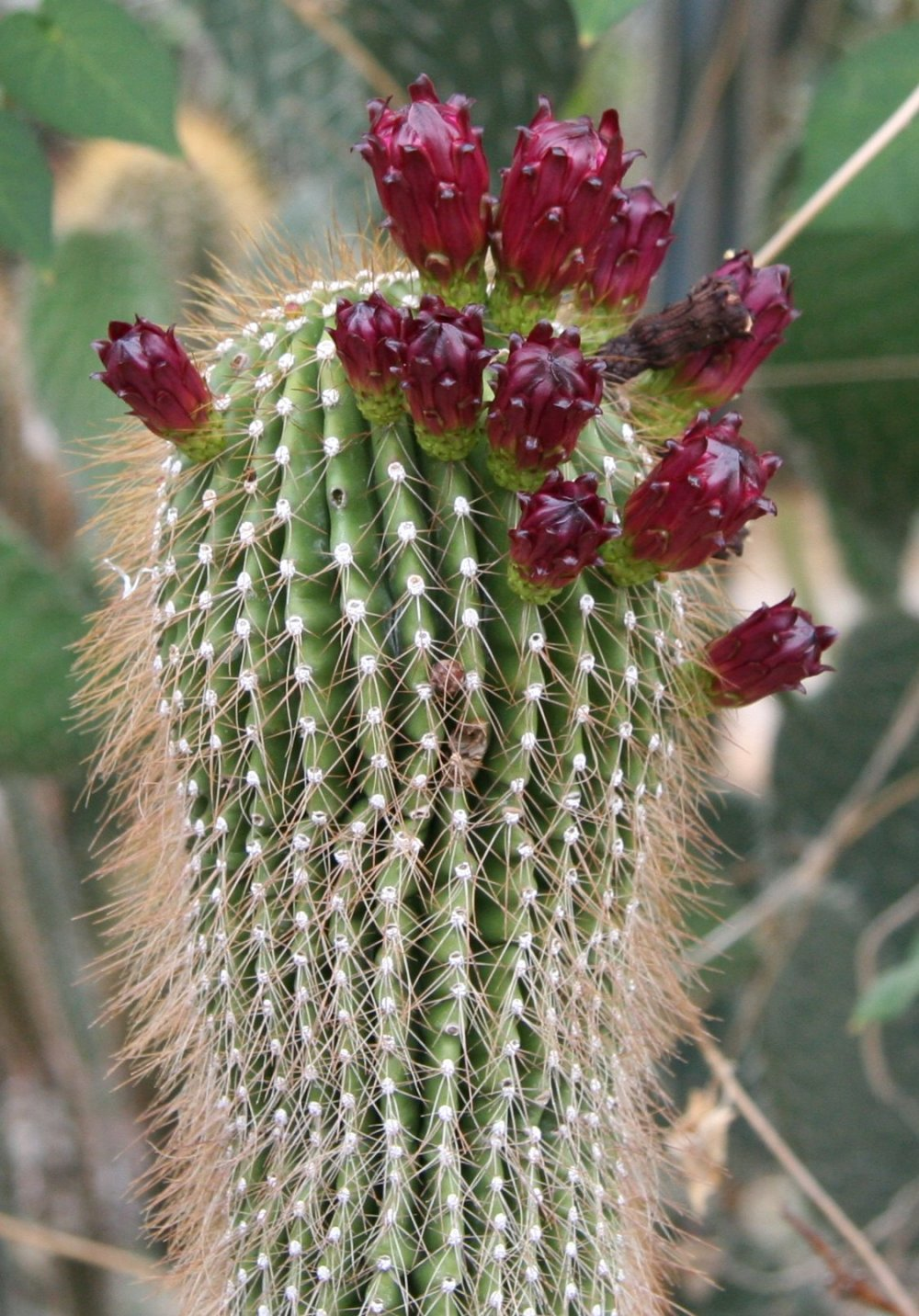
Flower buds

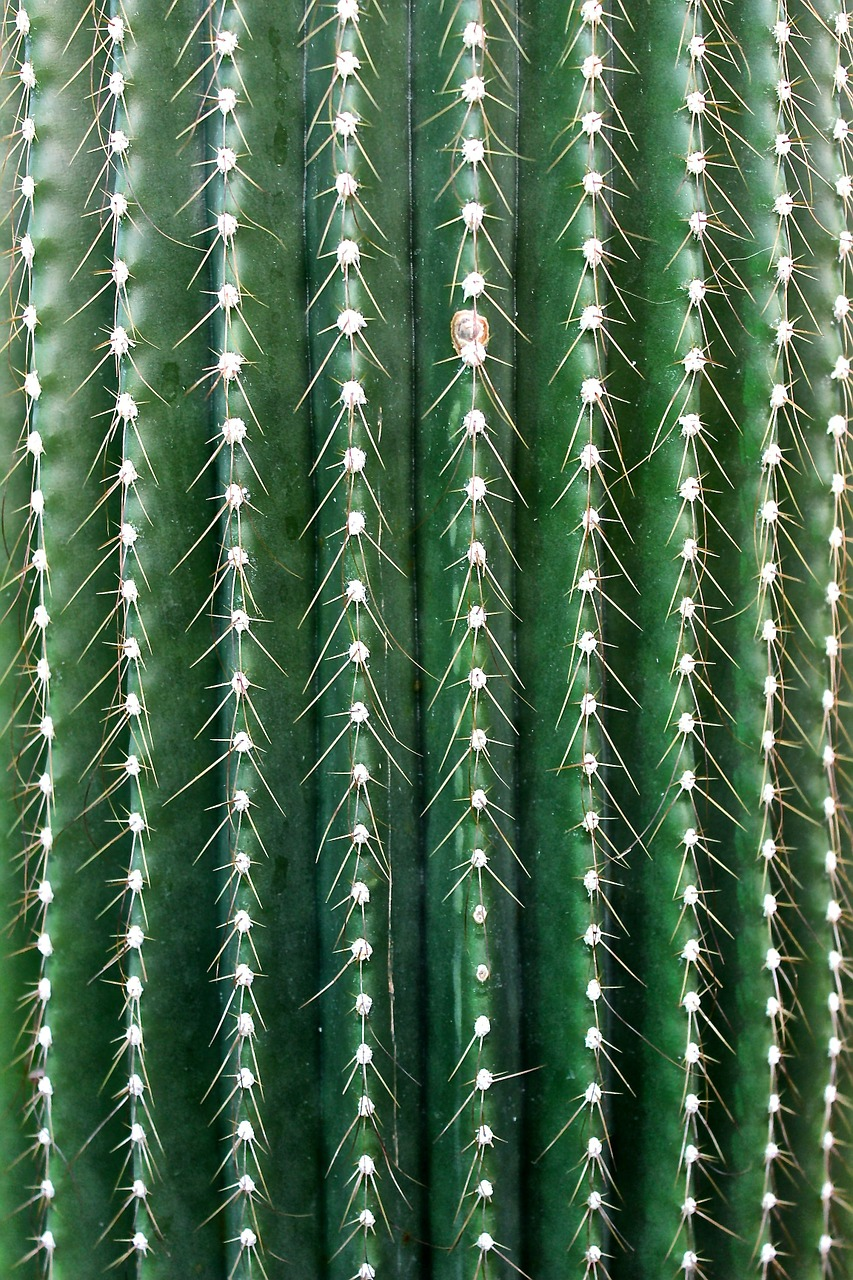
Spines

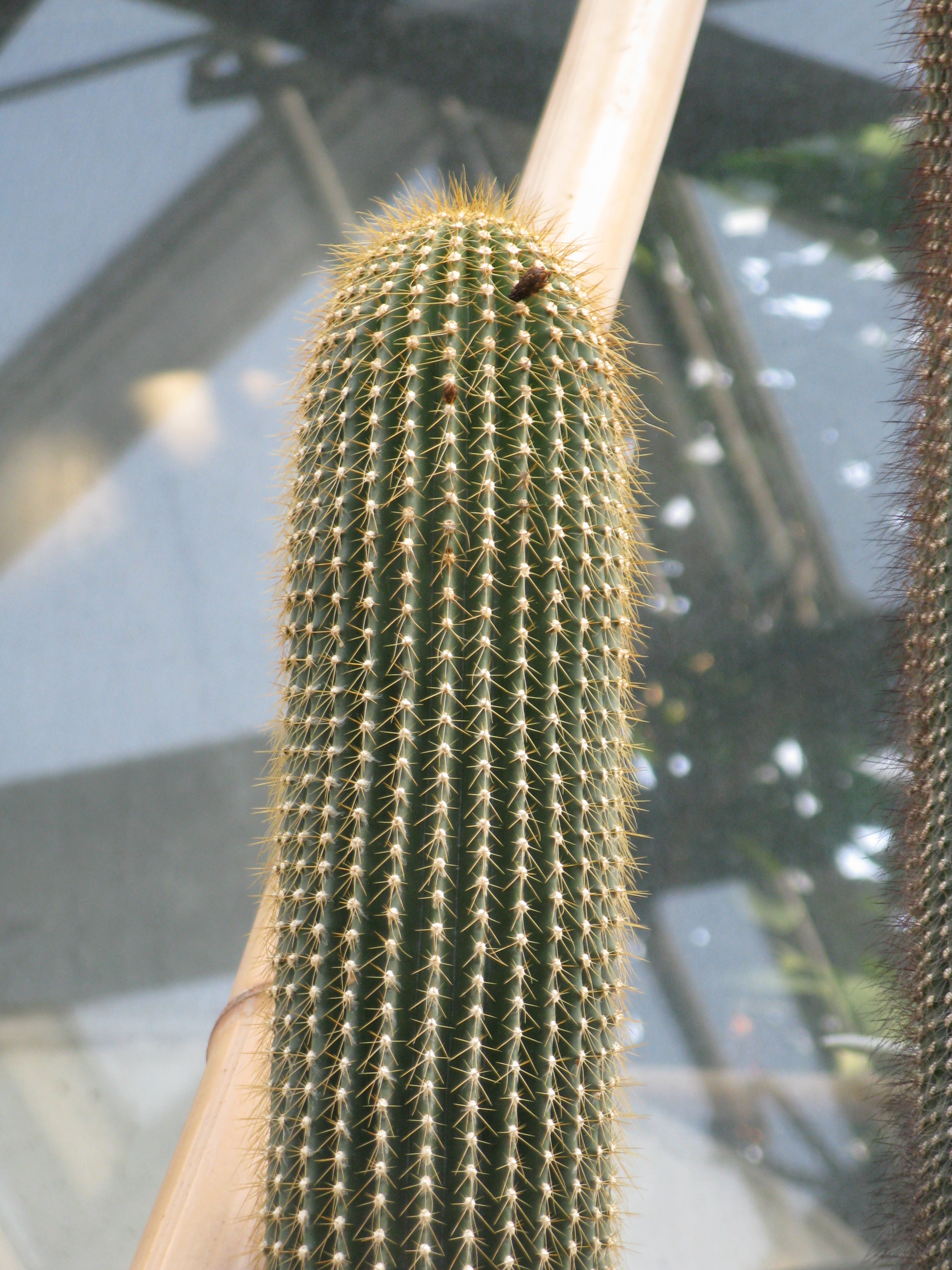
Plant

== Taxonomy ==
The first description as Cereus polylophus was published in 1828 by Augustin Pyramus de Candolle. The specific epithet polylophus is derived from the Greek words poly for 'many' and lophos for 'crest', referring to the numerous ribs of the species. Nathaniel Lord Britton and Joseph Nelson Rose placed the species in the genus Cephalocereus in 1909. Further nomenclature synonyms are Pilocereus polylophus, Neobuxbaumia polylopha, and Carnegiea polylopha.

== Distribution ==
Cephalocereus polylophus is native to the Mexican states of Hidalgo, Querétaro, Guanajuato and San Luis Potosí.

== Conservation ==
Neobuxbaumia polylopha was assessed as "vulnerable" in the 2009 IUCN Red List, where it is said to be native only to the Mexican states of Hidalgo, Querétaro and Guanajuato. As of April 2023, N. polylopha was regarded as a synonym of Cephalocereus polylophus, which Plants of the World Online gives a somewhat wider distribution.
