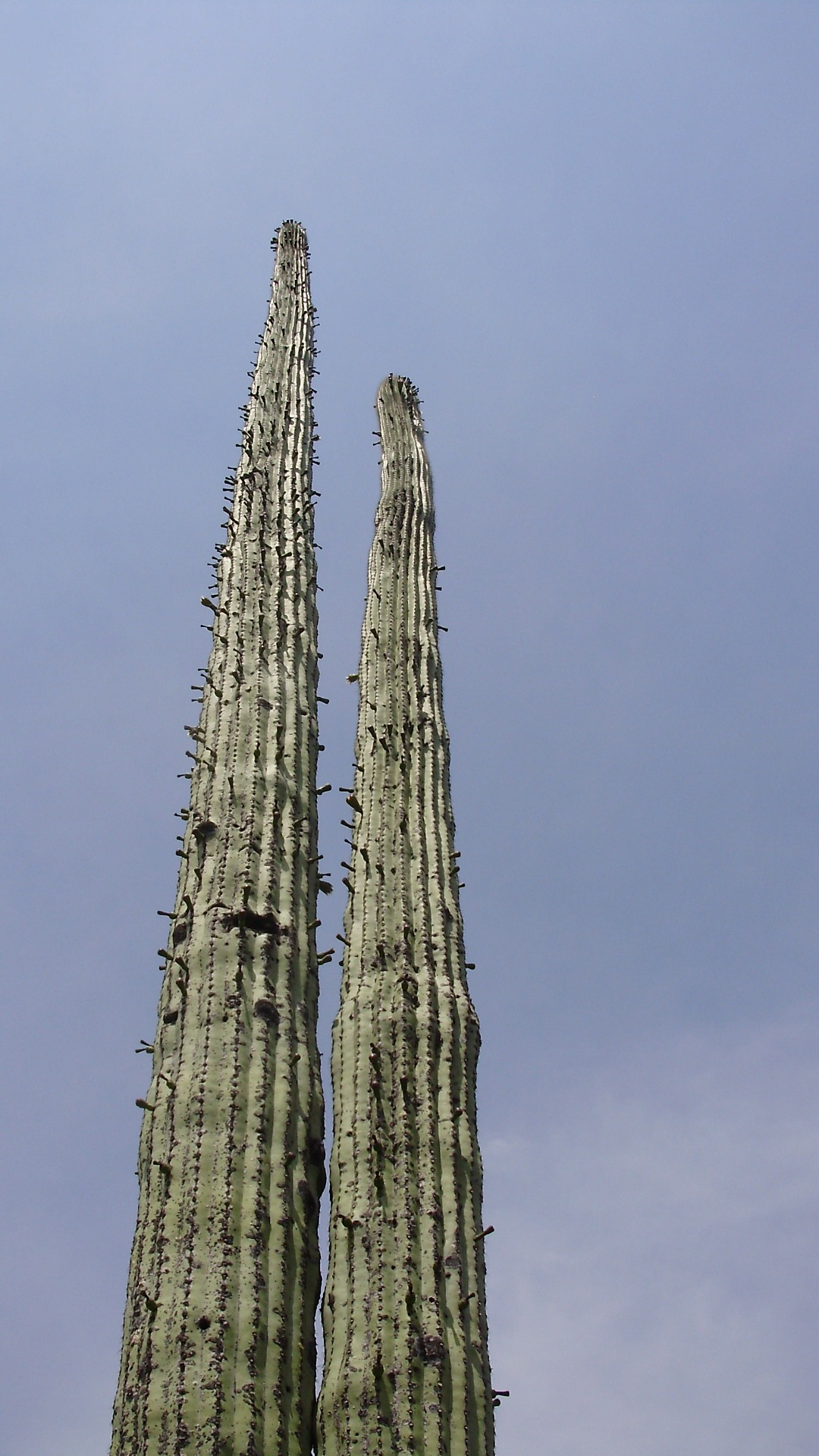

Conservation status
- Least Concern (IUCN 3.1)

Scientific classification
- Kingdom: Plantae
- Clade: Tracheophytes
- Clade: Angiosperms
- Clade: Eudicots
- Order: Caryophyllales
- Family: Cactaceae
- Subfamily: Cactoideae
- Genus: Cephalocereus
- Species: C. mezcalaensis

Binomial name
- Cephalocereus mezcalaensis Bravo
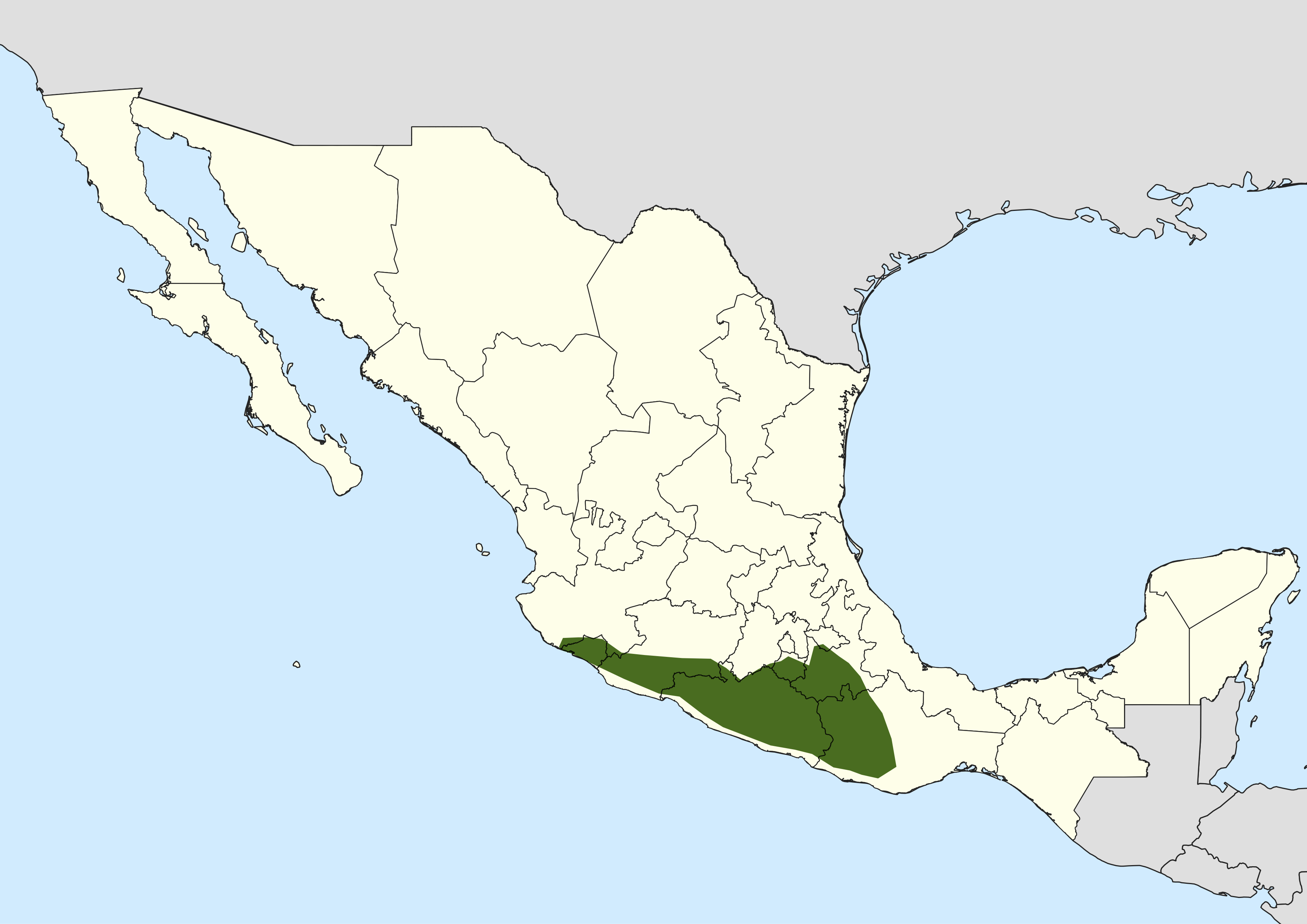

Synonyms
- Carnegiea mezcalaensis (Bravo) P.V.Heath 1992; Neobuxbaumia mezcalaensis (Bravo) Backeb. 1941; Pilocereus mezcalaensis (Bravo) W.T.Marshall 1941; Carnegiea mezcalaensis var. multiareolata (E.Y.Dawson) P.V.Heath 1992; Cephalocereus mezcalaensis var. multiareolatus E.Y.Dawson 1948; Cephalocereus mezcalaensis var. robustus E.Y.Dawson 1948; Cephalocereus multiareolatus (E.Y.Dawson) H.J.Tapia & S.Arias 2017; Neobuxbaumia mezcalaensis var. multiareolata (E.Y.Dawson) E.Y.Dawson 1952; Neobuxbaumia mezcalaensis var. robusta (E.Y.Dawson) Backeb. 1951; Neobuxbaumia multiareolata (E.Y.Dawson) Bravo, Scheinvar & Sánchez-Mej. 1972

= Cephalocereus mezcalaensis =

Species of cactus

Cephalocereus mezcalaensis is a species of Cephalocereus from Mexico.

== Description ==
Cephalocereus mezcalaensis grows individually and reaches a height of 5 to 10 meters. The columnar, yellowish green shoots have a diameter of 13 to 40 centimeters. The 13 to 25 ribs are wide and angular. The one to four slightly flattened central spines are straight, dark and only slightly longer than the five to nine marginal spines. The expanded marginal spines are whitish to yellowish, darker at their tip and 0.8 to 2 centimeters long.

The funnel-shaped flowers often appear along the entire shoot. They are white to yellowish and purple and up to 5 centimeters long. Its pericarpel and flower tube are covered with tubercles with small scales and wool. The spherical to egg-shaped fruits are 3 to 4 centimeters long and covered with humps that carry perennial wool and thorns.

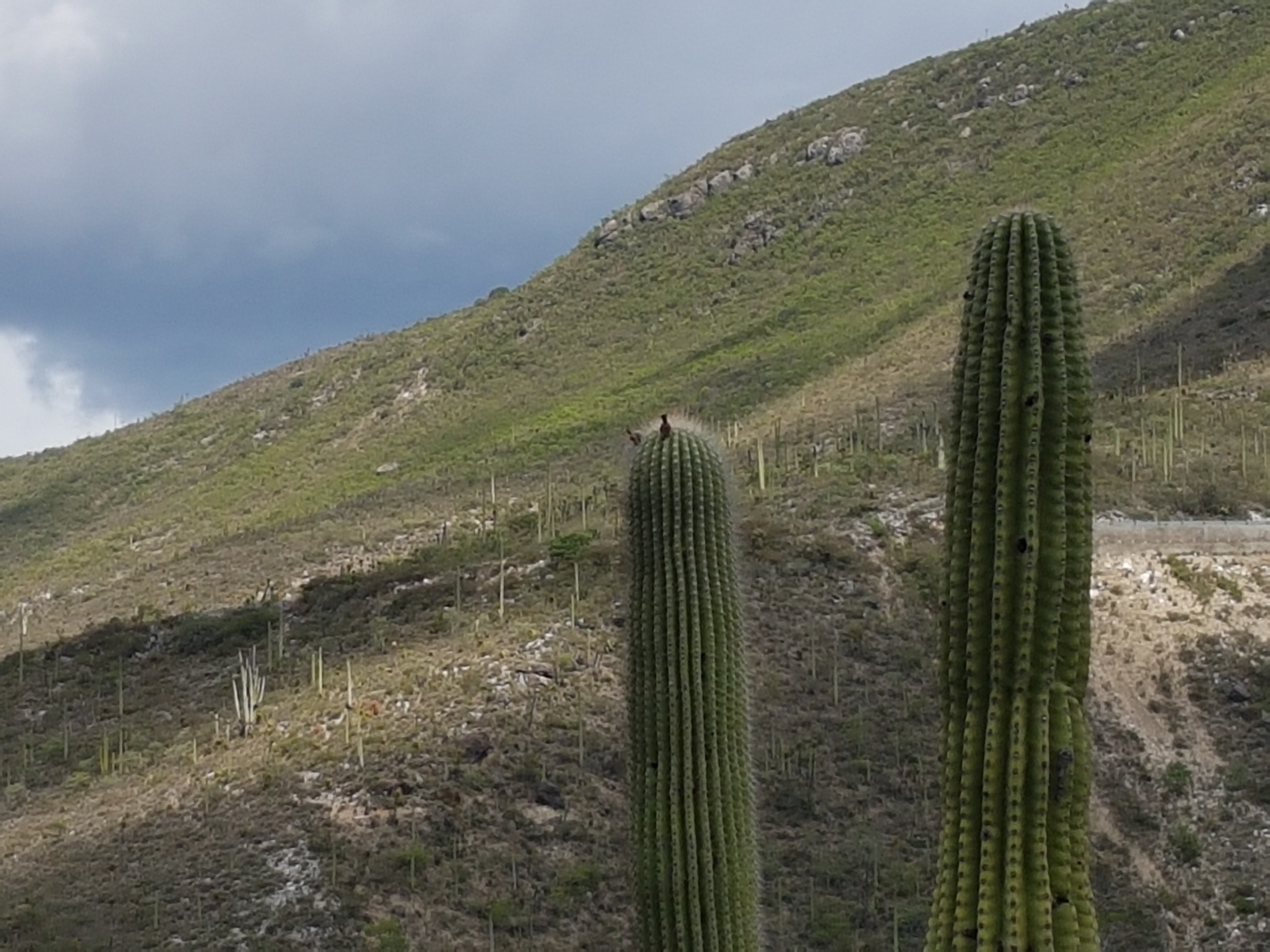

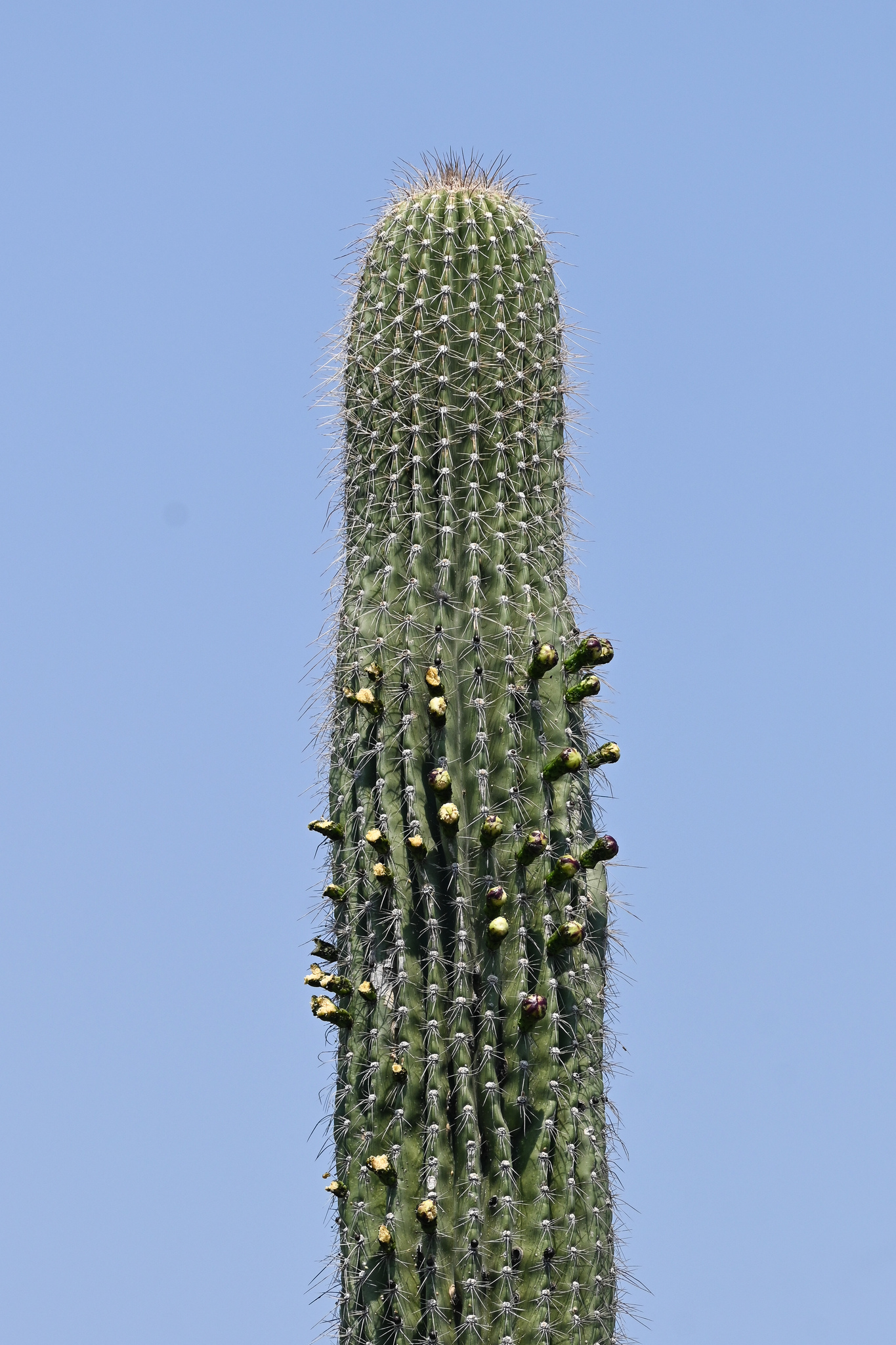
Plant blooming

== Distribution ==
Cephalocereus mezcalaensis is found in the Mexican states of Colima, Guerrero, Jalisco, Michoacán, Morelos, Oaxaca and Puebla. It lives in tropical deciduous forests and xeric scrublands, on limestone soils, at elevations of 400 to 2000 m above sea level.

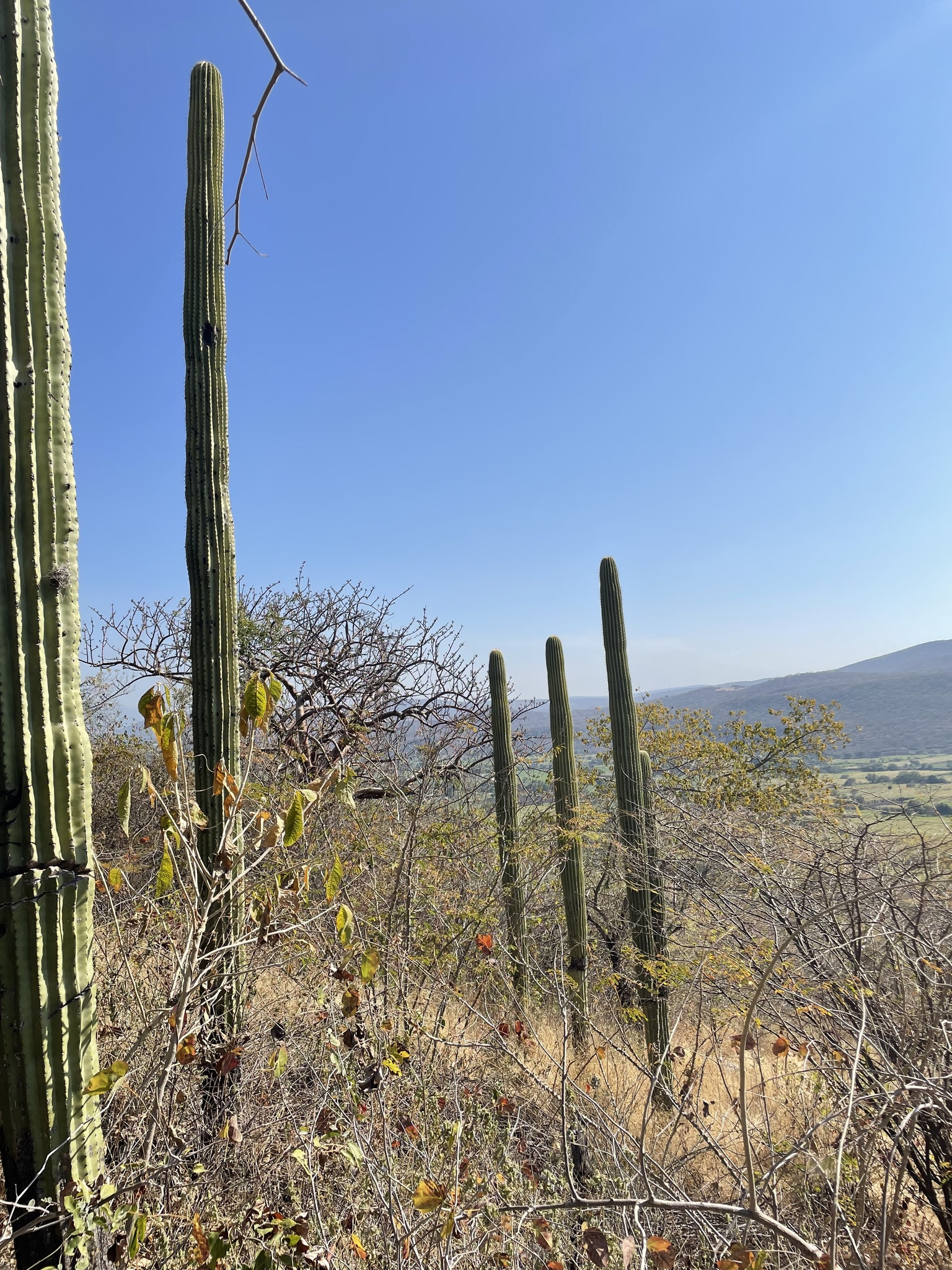
Plant growing in Fraccionamiento Huertos de Agua Linda, Morelos, Mexico

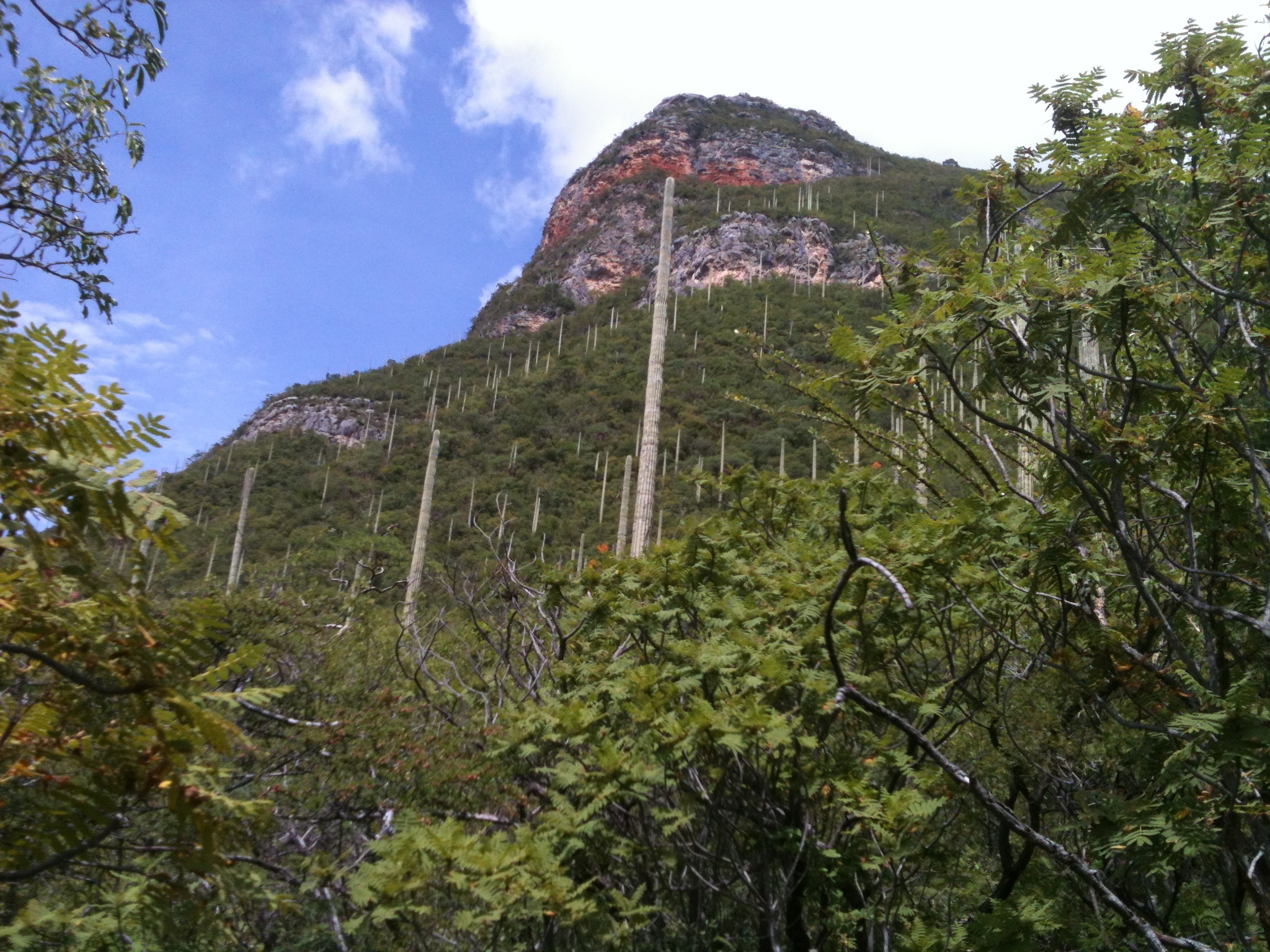
Habitat in San Marcos Arteaga, Oaxaca, Mexico

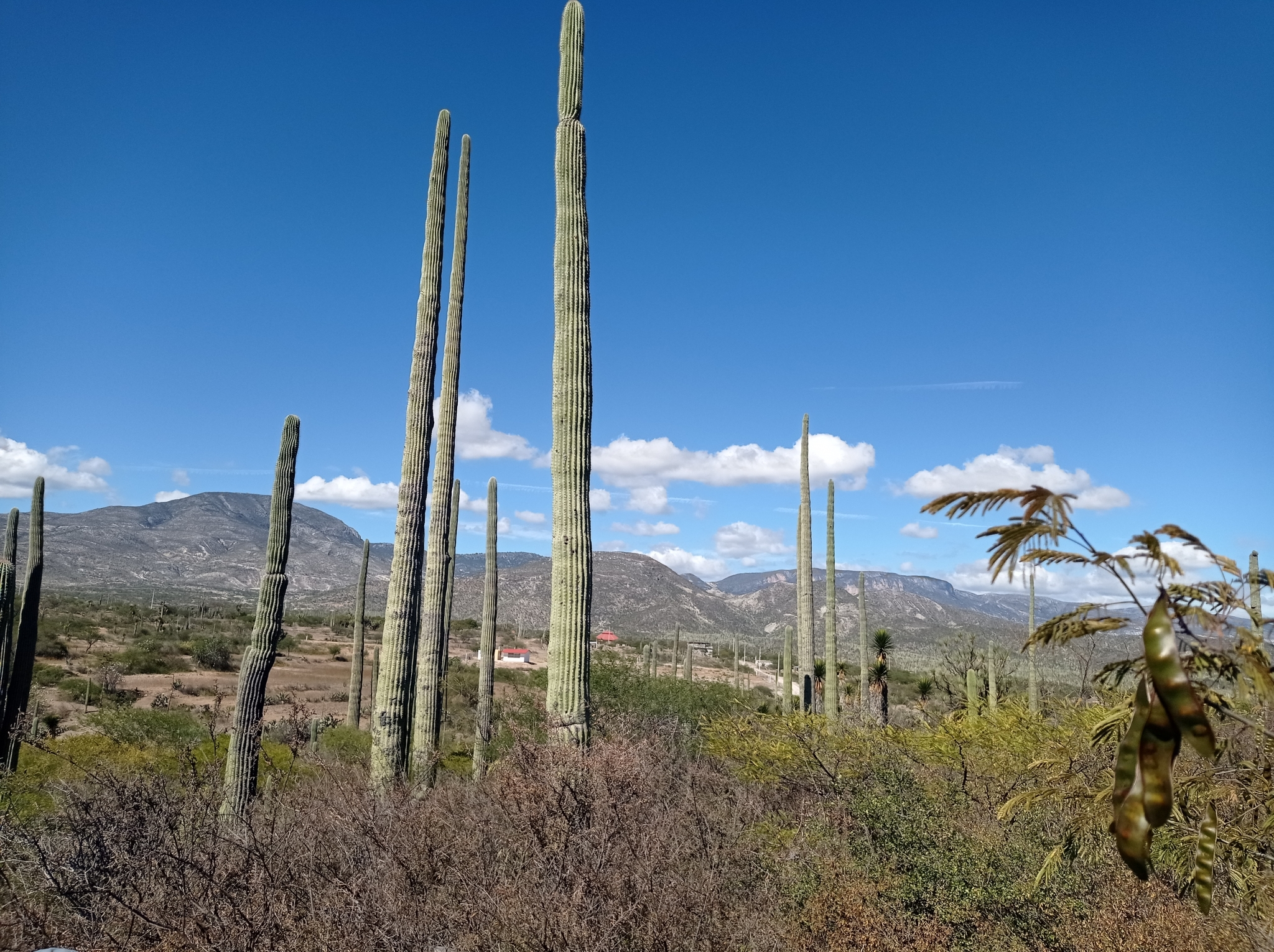
Habitat in San Juan Raya, Puebla, Mexico

== Taxonomy ==
The first description was made in 1932 by Helia Bravo Hollis. The specific epithet mezcalaensis refers to the occurrence of the species in the valley of the Río Mezcala in the Mexican state of Guerrero. Nomenclature synonyms are Neobuxbaumia mezcalaensis (Bravo) Backeb. (1941), Neodawsonia mezcalaensis (Bravo) Backeb. (1941), Pilocereus mezcalaensis (Bravo) W.T.Marshall (1941) and Carnegiea mezcalaensis (Bravo) P.V.Heath (1992).
