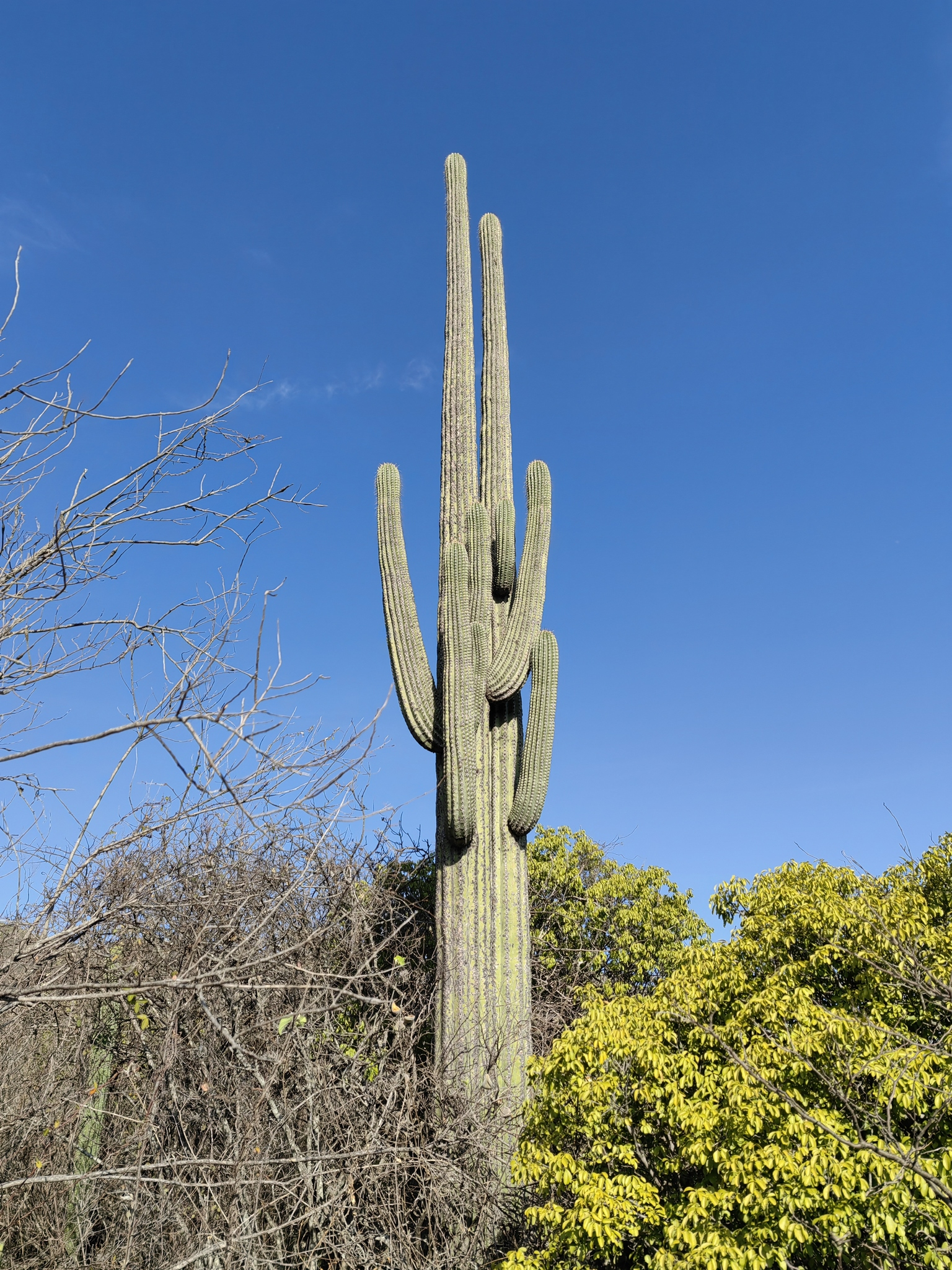

Scientific classification
- Kingdom: Plantae
- Clade: Tracheophytes
- Clade: Angiosperms
- Clade: Eudicots
- Order: Caryophyllales
- Family: Cactaceae
- Subfamily: Cactoideae
- Genus: Cephalocereus
- Species: C. nudus

Binomial name
- Cephalocereus nudus E.Y.Dawson

Synonyms
- Carnegiea squamulosa (Scheinvar & Sánchez-Mej.) P.V.Heath; Carnegiea tetetzo var. nuda (E.Y.Dawson) P.V.Heath; Cephalocereus tetetzo var. nudus (E.Y.Dawson) E.Y.Dawson; Neobuxbaumia squamulosa Scheinvar & Sánchez-Mej.; Neobuxbaumia tetetzo var. nuda (E.Y.Dawson) E.Y.Dawson

= Cephalocereus nudus =

Species of plant

Cephalocereus nudus is a species of succulent flowering plant in the genus Cephalocereus, within the family Cactaceae. It is endemic to southwestern Mexico.

== Description ==
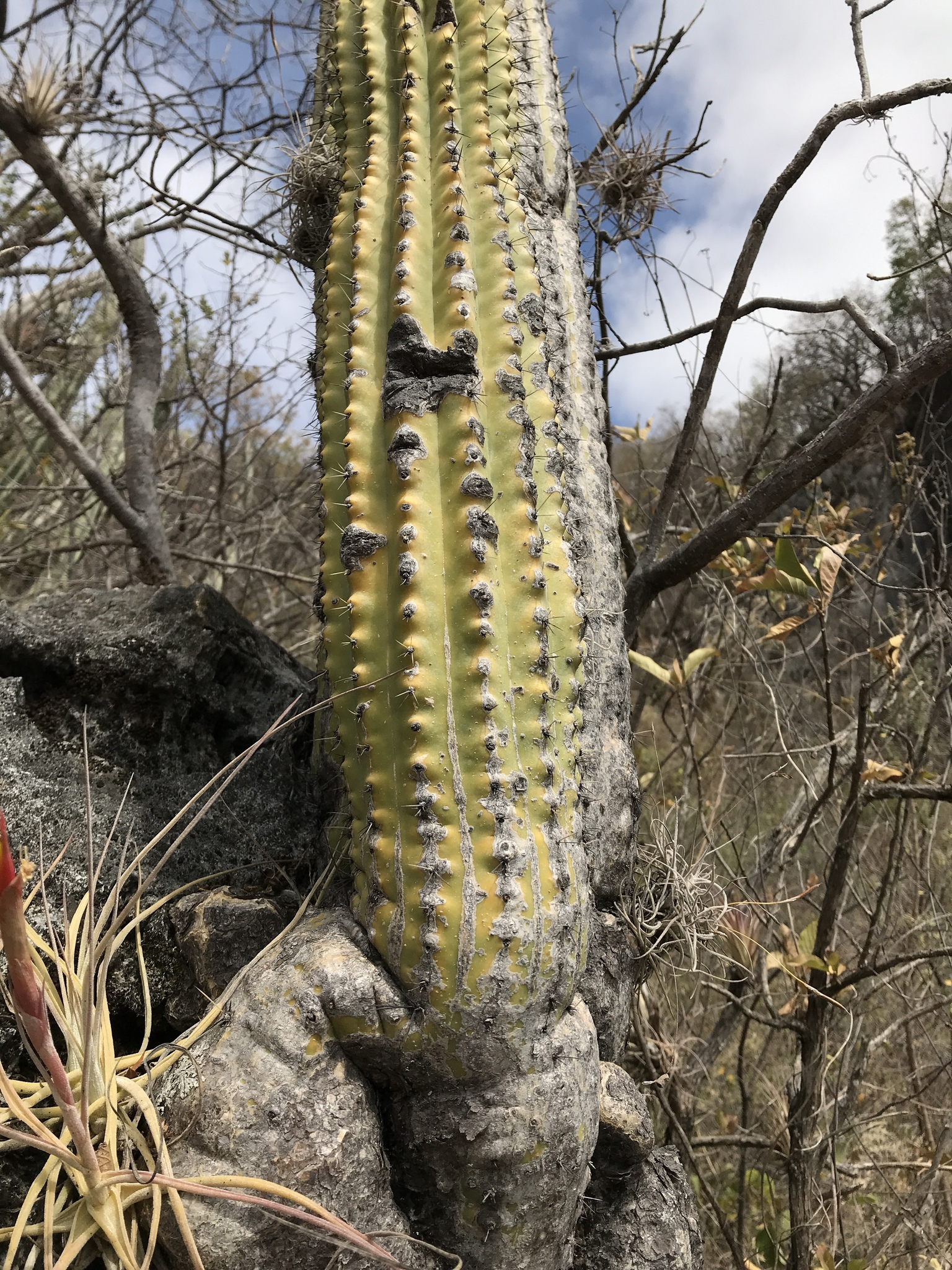
Stem

Cephalocereus nudus is a species of columnar, treelike and branched cactus. It can grow to 10 m in height, with a cylindrical trunk measuring up to 70 cm in diameter.

The stems are generally light green to grayish in color, and have 15-20 ribs. On the ribs are areoles with short spines; they may lose the spines as the plant matures, this being the reason for the specific epithet (nudus).

The flowers are off-white in color and bell-shaped; they open at night. The hypanthium and floral tube are covered in small scales. The fruits are egg-shaped, and are covered in small scales and woolly trichomes. The seeds are black in color, smooth, and pear-shaped.

== Distribution and habitat ==
This species is native to southwestern Mexico, where it grows in desert and dry shrubland biomes.

== Taxonomy ==
Cephalocereus nudus was described by the American botanist Elmer Yale Dawson, who published this name in Allan Hancock Foundation Publications: Occasional Papers 1: 12 in 1948.

Etymology

- Cephalocereus: the genus name comes from the Greek word kephalē (meaning "head", in reference to the woolly structure from which the flowers emerge. This was formerly called a cephalium, but under the current definition of this term, Cephalocereus instead has a pseudocephalium) and the Latin word cereus (meaning "candle"), referring to its straight, elongated growth form.
- nudus: the specific epithet is derived from Latin; it means "nude" or "uncovered", referring to the low numbers of spines exhibited by this species when mature.

== Uses ==
This species is cultivated mainly as an ornamental. It may be propagated vegetatively via cuttings, or via seed.

== Gallery ==
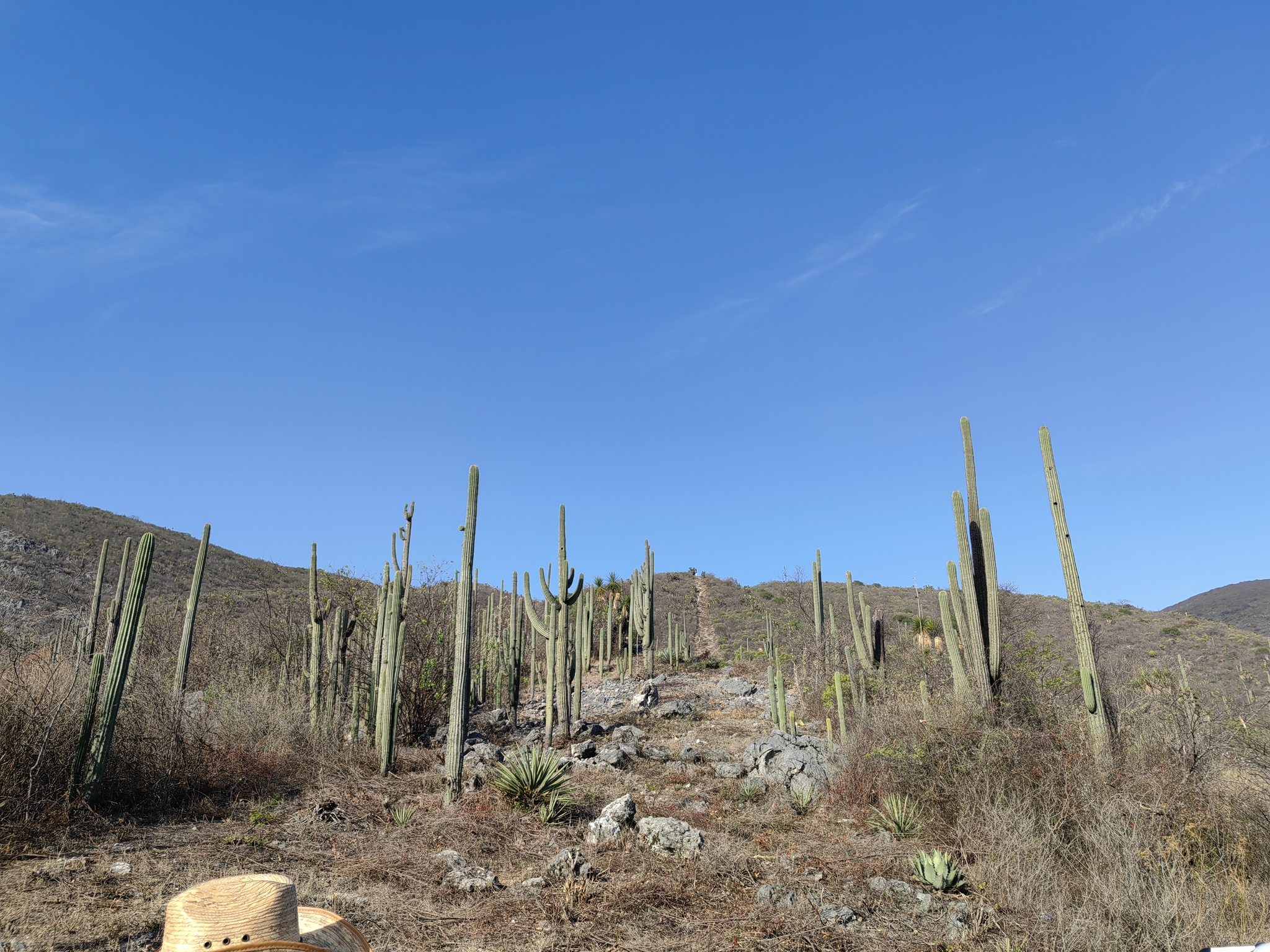
In habitat in Santa María del Tule, Oaxaca, Mexico

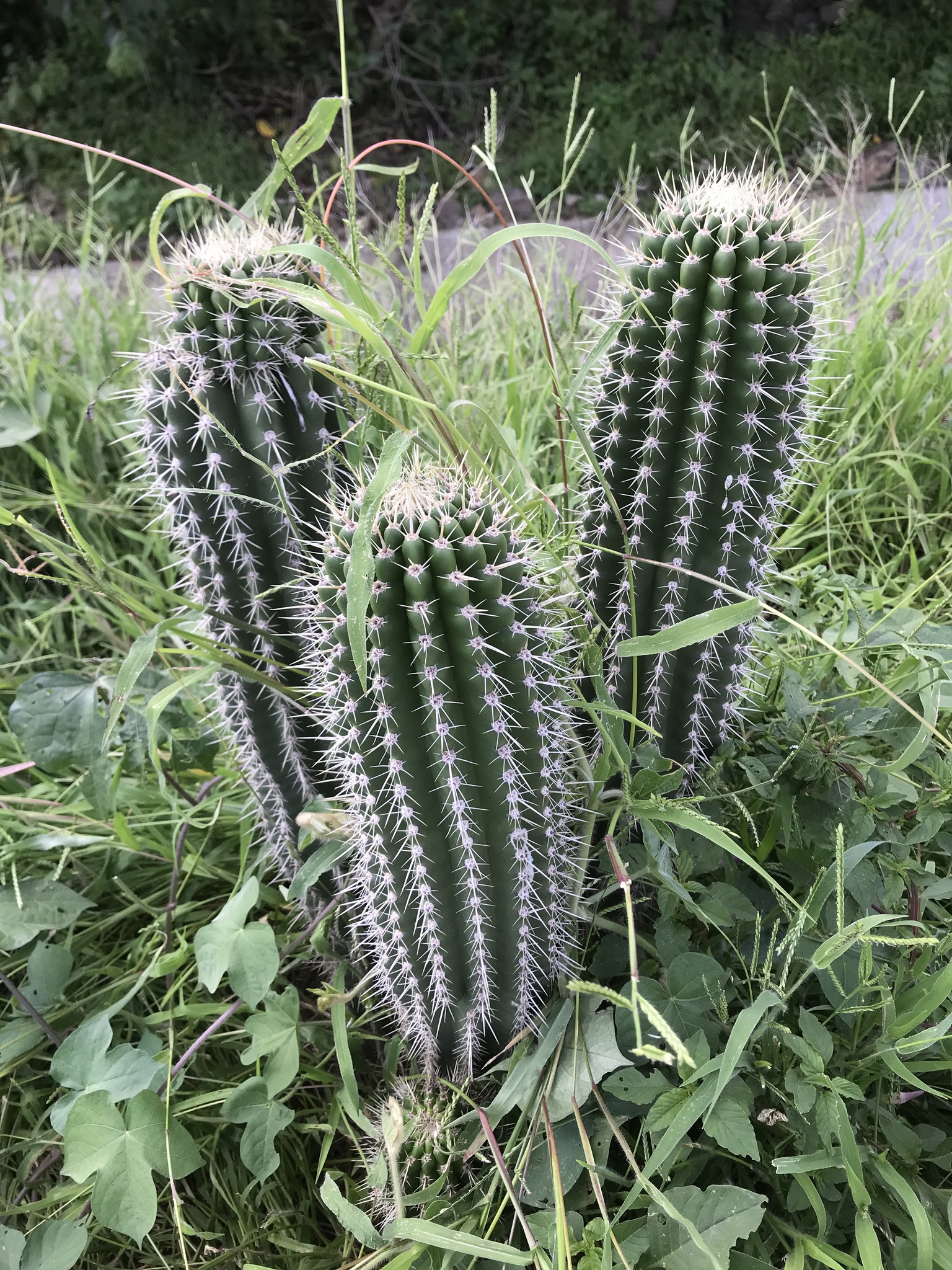
Young plant

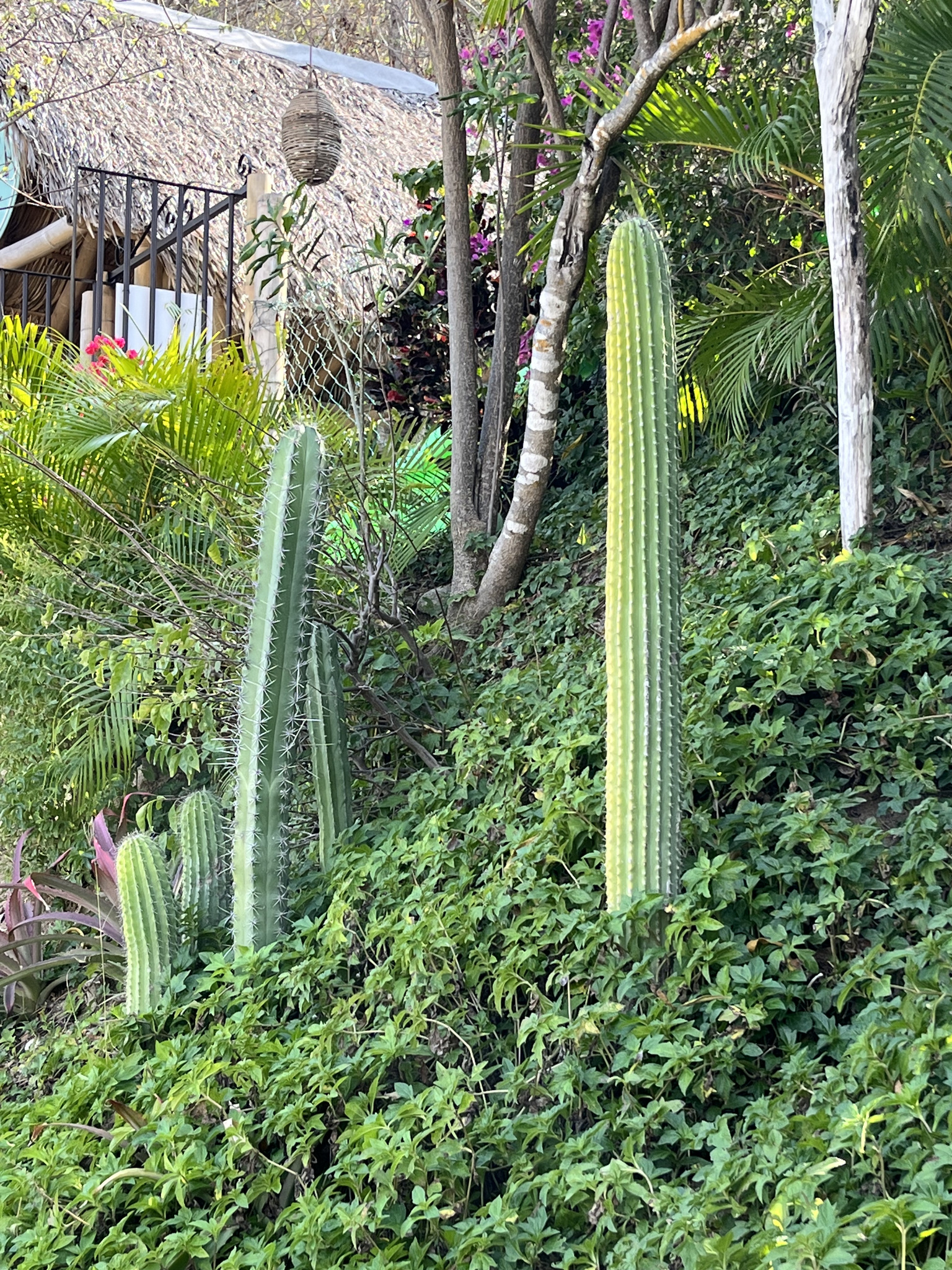
Columnar habit

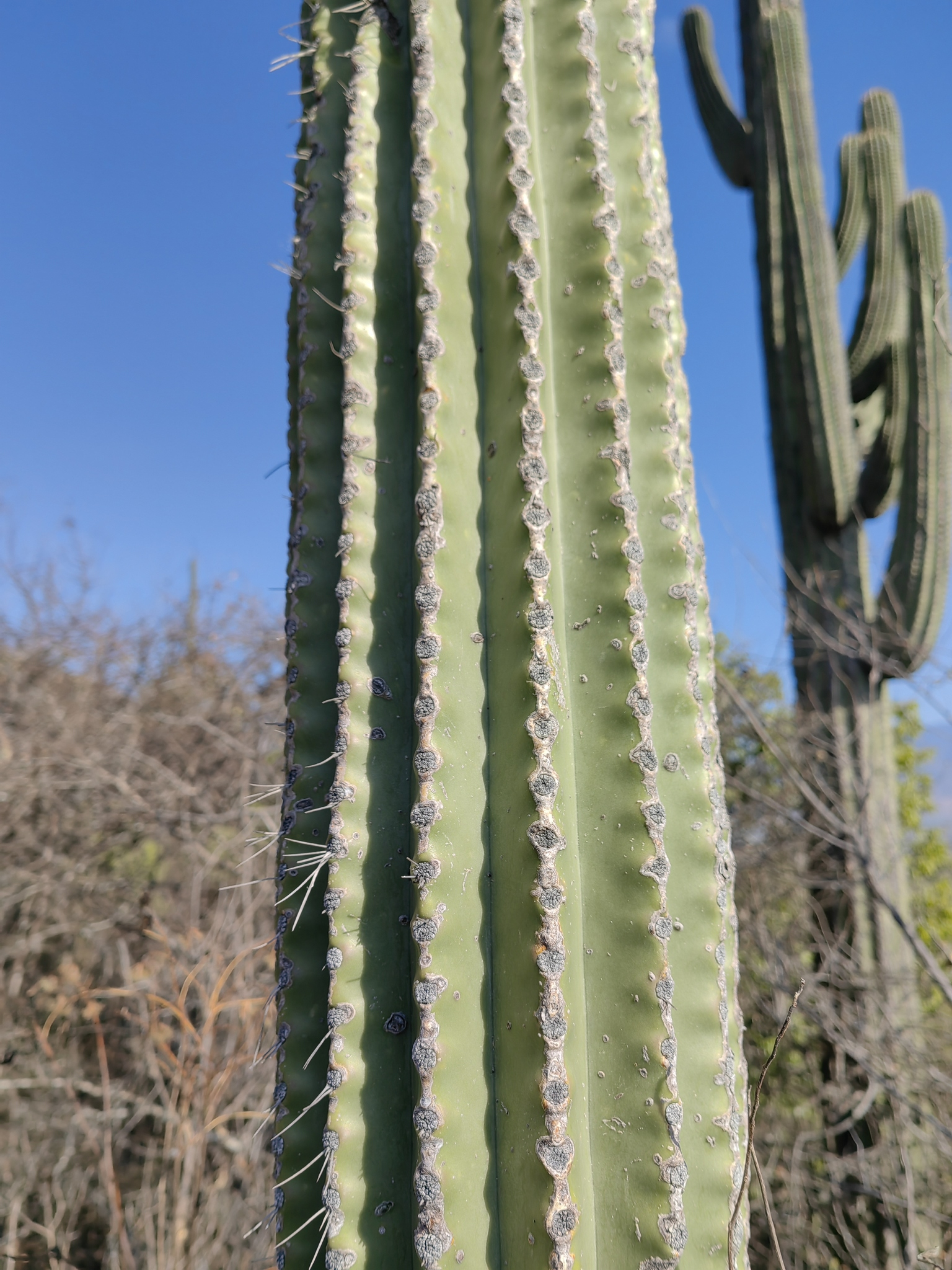
Ribs

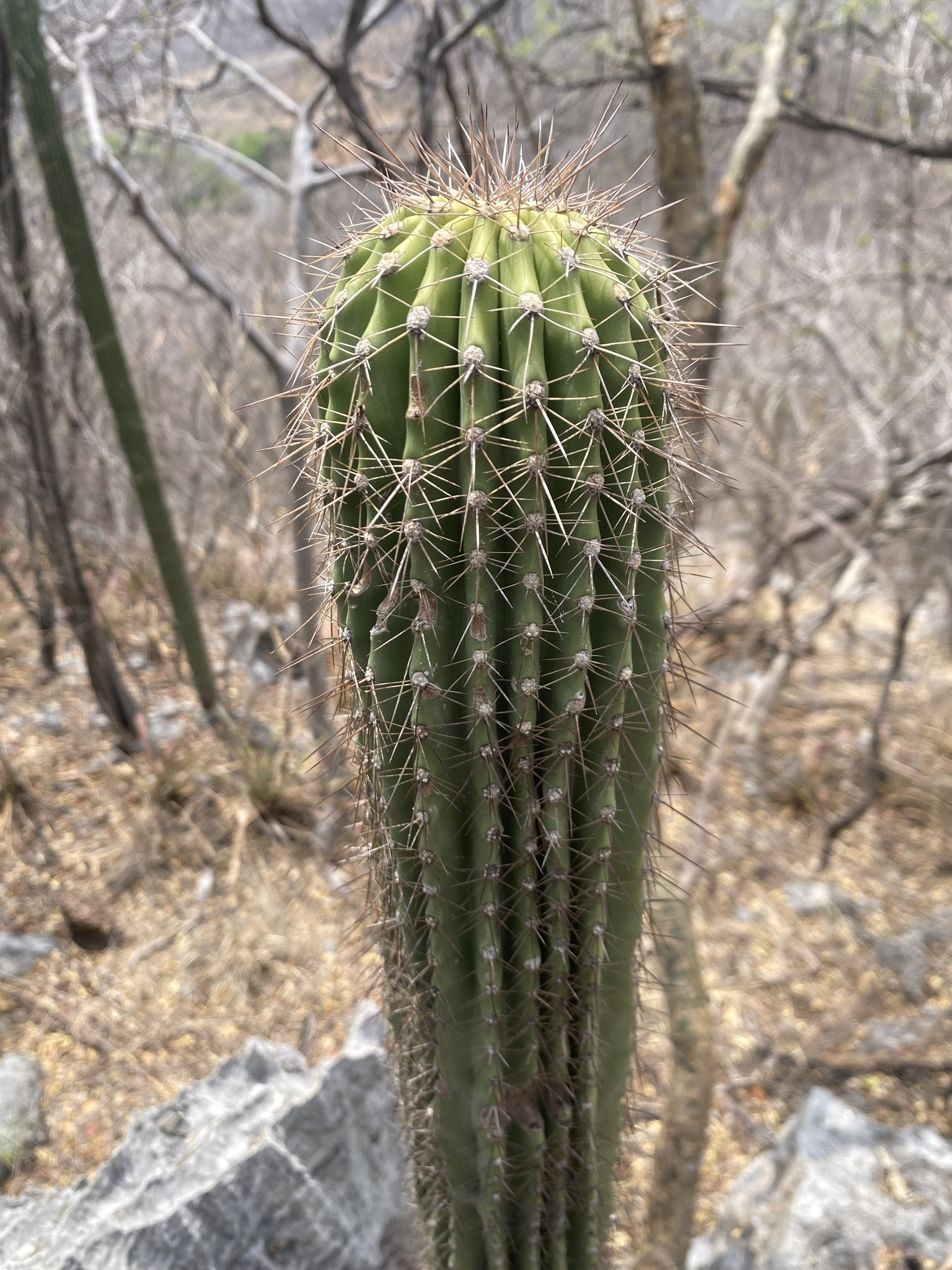
Stem
