= Cephalocereus parvispinus =

Scientific classification
- Kingdom: Plantae
- Clade: Tracheophytes
- Clade: Angiosperms
- Clade: Eudicots
- Order: Caryophyllales
- Family: Cactaceae
- Subfamily: Cactoideae
- Genus: Cephalocereus
- Species: C. parvispinus

Binomial name
- Cephalocereus parvispinus S.Arias, H.J.Tapia & U.Guzmán

Species of cactus

Cephalocereus parvispinus is a species of succulent flowering plant in the genus Cephalocereus, within the family Cactaceae. It is endemic to southwestern Mexico, specifically to the state of Oaxaca.

== Description ==
Cephalocereus parvispinus is a species of columnar cactus with green, branched stems. It has a treelike growth form, and can grow to 8 m in height. The stems have 15-23 ribs, upon which are situated the areoles. The spines are very small.

The flowers are off-white, 3.5-4 cm in length, and bell-shaped. They open at night. The hypanthium and floral tube are covered in small, spineless scales. The fruits are egg-shaped, and are covered by small scales and woolly trichomes. They are dark red in color, and measure 1.7-2.2 cm in length. Inside, the pulp is white and the seeds are dark brown with rough surfaces.

== Distribution and habitat ==
This species is native to the state of Oaxaca in southern Mexico, where it grows mainly in the seasonally-dry tropical biome.

== Taxonomy ==
Cephalocereus parvispinus was described by the botanists Ángel Salvador Arias Montes, Héctor J. Tapia, and Ulises Guzmán Cruz, who published the name in the scientific journal Phytotaxa 392: 150 in 2019.

Etymology

- Cephalocereus: the genus name comes from the Greek word kephalē (meaning "head", in reference to the woolly structure from which the flowers emerge. This was formerly called a cephalium, but under the current definition of this term, Cephalocereus instead has a pseudocephalium) and the Latin word cereus (meaning "candle"), referring to its straight, elongated growth form.
- parvispinus: the specific epithet is derived from the Latin terms parvus (meaning "small") and spīnus (meaning "spine"), referencing this species' small spines compared to other Cephalocereus species.

== Cultivation ==
This species is cultivated mainly as an ornamental. It may be propagated vegetatively via cuttings, or via seed.
