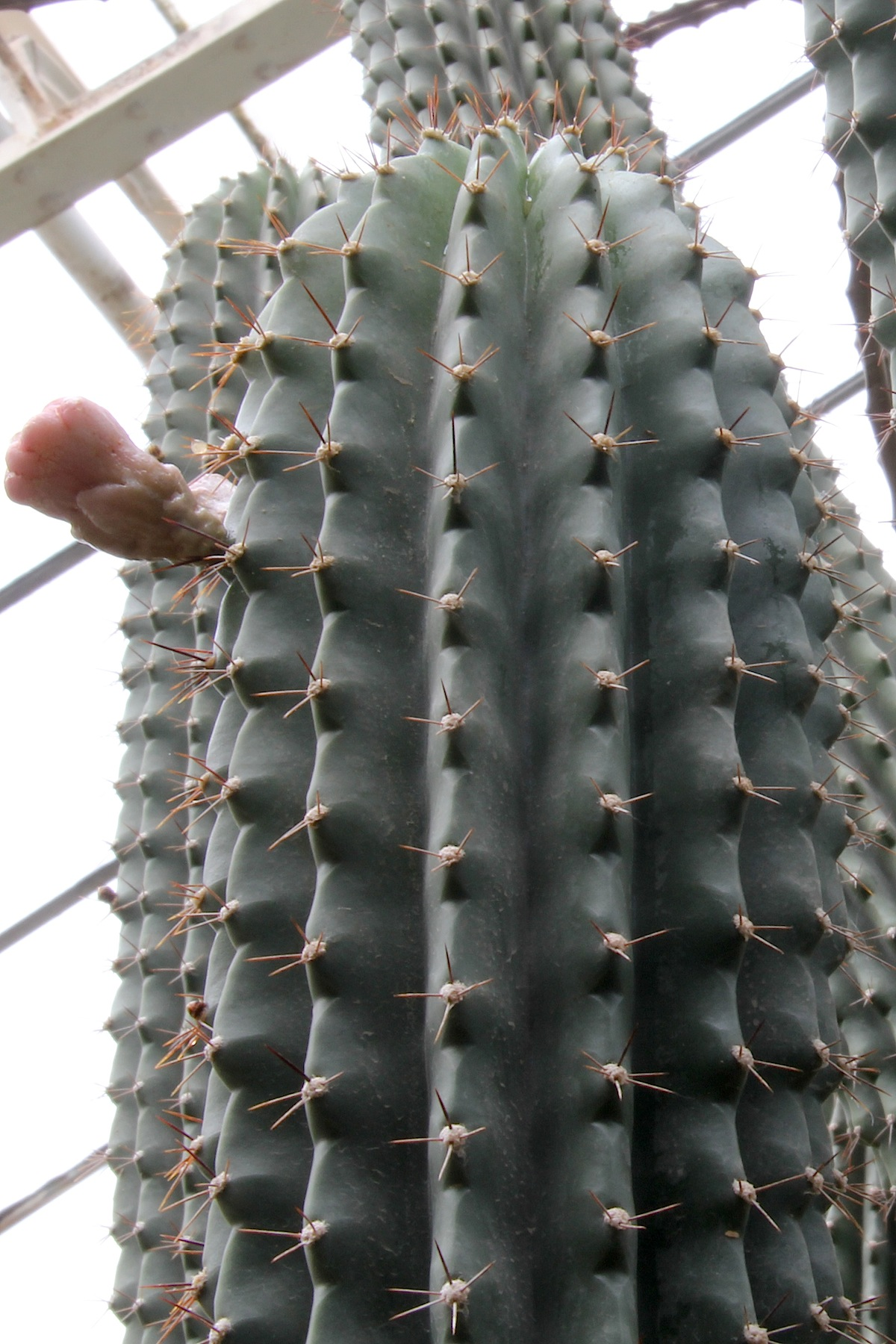

Conservation status
- Least Concern (IUCN 3.1)

Scientific classification
- Kingdom: Plantae
- Clade: Tracheophytes
- Clade: Angiosperms
- Clade: Eudicots
- Order: Caryophyllales
- Family: Cactaceae
- Subfamily: Cactoideae
- Genus: Cephalocereus
- Species: C. scoparius

Binomial name
- Cephalocereus scoparius,

Synonyms
- Carnegiea scoparia (Poselg.) P.V.Heath 1992; Cereus scoparius (Poselg.) A.Berger 1905; Neobuxbaumia scoparia (Poselg.) Backeb. 1941; Pilocereus scoparius Poselg. 1853; Lemaireocereus setispinus E.Y.Dawson 1948; Pilocereus sterkmanii K.Schum. 1897

= Cephalocereus scoparius =

Species of cactus

Cephalocereus scoparius is a species of Cephalocereus cactus plant from Mexico.

== Description ==
Cephalocereus scoparius grows tree-shaped and candelabra-like with richly branched, ascending shoots that are 8 to 15 centimeters in diameter. Growth heights of 6 to 12 meters are achieved. The clearly pronounced trunk has a diameter of up to 30 centimeters. The 14 to 30 very variable ribs are slightly bumpy and dented between the areoles. Its cross section is broadly triangular. The one or two central spines are black and turn gray with age. They are flattened, somewhat stiff, straight or slightly curved inward and 1.8 to 2.1 centimeters long. The usually five to nine flexible marginal spines are slightly curved downwards. They are initially dark and become lighter as they age. The marginal spines are 5 to 13 millimeters long. The flowering part of the shoots located at the top of older shoots is covered with numerous flexible bristles 5 to 13 centimeters long.

The bell-shaped flowers appear near the tips of the shoots. They are reddish, 1.8 to 2.1 centimeters long and reach a diameter of up to 3.1 centimeters. Its pericarpel and flower tube are covered with large tubercles and scales that later fall off. The spherical red fruits are up to 3 centimeters long.

== Distribution ==
Cephalocereus scoparius is distributed in the Mexican states of Oaxaca and Veracruz.

== Taxonomy ==
The first description as Pilocereus scoparius was made in 1853 by Heinrich Poselger. The specific epithet scoparius comes from Latin, means 'broom-like' and refers to the species' thorns. Nathaniel Lord Britton and Joseph Nelson Rose placed the species in the genus Cephalocereus in 1909. Further nomenclature synonyms are Cereus scoparius (Poselg.) A.Berger (1905), Neobuxbaumia scoparia (Poselg.) Backeb. (1941) and Carnegiea scoparia (Poselg.) P.V.Heath (1992).
