= Cephalocereus novus =

Conservation status
- Data Deficient (IUCN 3.1)

Scientific classification
- Kingdom: Plantae
- Clade: Tracheophytes
- Clade: Angiosperms
- Clade: Eudicots
- Order: Caryophyllales
- Family: Cactaceae
- Subfamily: Cactoideae
- Genus: Cephalocereus
- Species: C. novus

Binomial name
- Cephalocereus novus (P.V.Heath) M.H.J.van der Meer

Synonyms
- Carnegiea laui P.V.Heath; Carnegiea nova P.V.Heath; Cephalocereus sanchez-mejoradae A.B. Lau; Neobuxbaumia laui (P.V.Heath) D.R.Hunt; Neobuxbaumia sanchezmejoradae A.B.Lau

Species of cactus

Cephalocereus novus is a species of cactus in the genus Cephalocereus native to Mexico.

== Description ==
Cephalocereus novus grow in a tall, tree like fashion, reaching up to 22 meters tall.

== Range ==
Cephalocereus novus is endemic to the state of Oaxaca in Mexico, with only small populations remaining.

== Etymology ==
The former name Cephalocereus sanchez-mejoradae refers to Mexican cactus specialist Hernando Sánchez Mejorada (1926-1988).

== Taxonomy ==
Cephalocereus novus used to be considered a species of the now defunct genus Neobuxbaumia. When Neobuxbaumia was absorbed into the genus Cephalocereus, the species was added. At times it had also been considered a species of Pilocereus, and Carnegiea.
