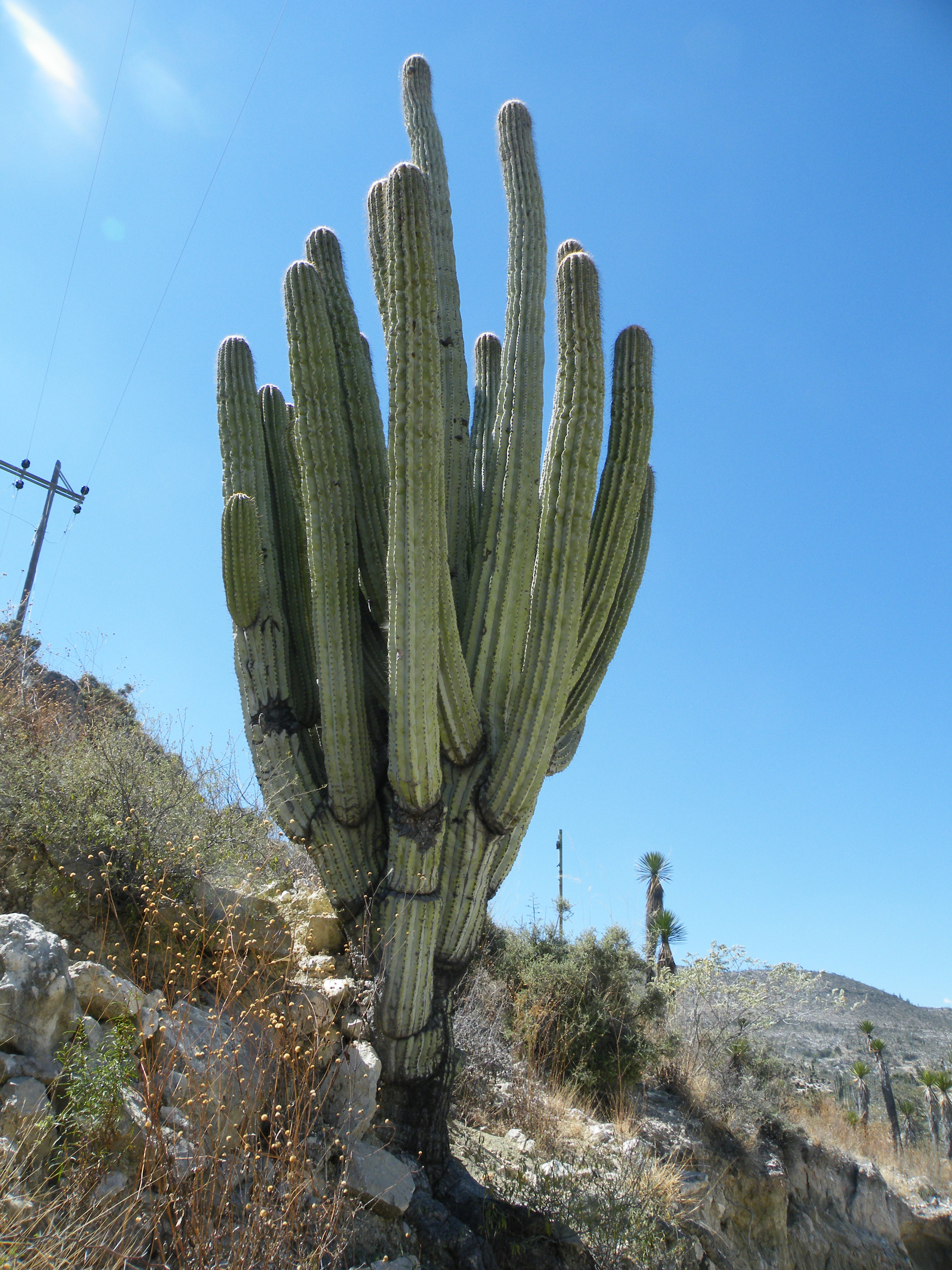

Conservation status
- Least Concern (IUCN 3.1)

Scientific classification
- Kingdom: Plantae
- Clade: Tracheophytes
- Clade: Angiosperms
- Clade: Eudicots
- Order: Caryophyllales
- Family: Cactaceae
- Subfamily: Cactoideae
- Genus: Cephalocereus
- Species: C. fulviceps

Binomial name
- Cephalocereus fulviceps (F.A.C.Weber ex K.Schum.) H.E.Moore

Synonyms
- Carnegiea fulviceps (F.A.C.Weber ex K.Schum.) P.V.Heath 1992; Cereus fulviceps (F.A.C.Weber ex K.Schum.) A.Berger 1905; Mitrocereus fulviceps (F.A.C.Weber ex K.Schum.) Backeb. 1960; Pachycereus fulviceps (F.A.C.Weber ex K.Schum.) D.R.Hunt 1991; Pilocereus fulviceps F.A.C.Weber 1897; Pseudomitrocereus fulviceps (F.A.C.Weber ex K.Schum.) Bravo & Buxb. 1961

= Cephalocereus fulviceps =

Species of cactus

Cephalocereus fulviceps is a species of Cephalocereus from Mexico.

== Description ==
Cephalocereus fulviceps initially grows in a columnar shape, later becomes richly branched in a candelabra shape and reaches a height of up to 12 meters. The glaucous green shoots are up to 8 meters long. There are eleven to 14 ribs. Of the three central spines, one is 6 to 7 centimeters longer than the others. The remaining central spines are only 2 centimeters long. The eight to twelve thin, yellowish marginal spines are up to 10 millimeters long. The terminal pseudocephalium is formed from dense, brownish wool and bristles.

The funnel-shaped, cream-colored flowers appear from the pseudocephalium. They open at night, are 6 to 7 centimeters long and 6 centimeters in diameter. Its pericarpel and flower tube are covered with brick-shaped scales and long, dark yellow hairs. The spherical fruits contain wool and hair.

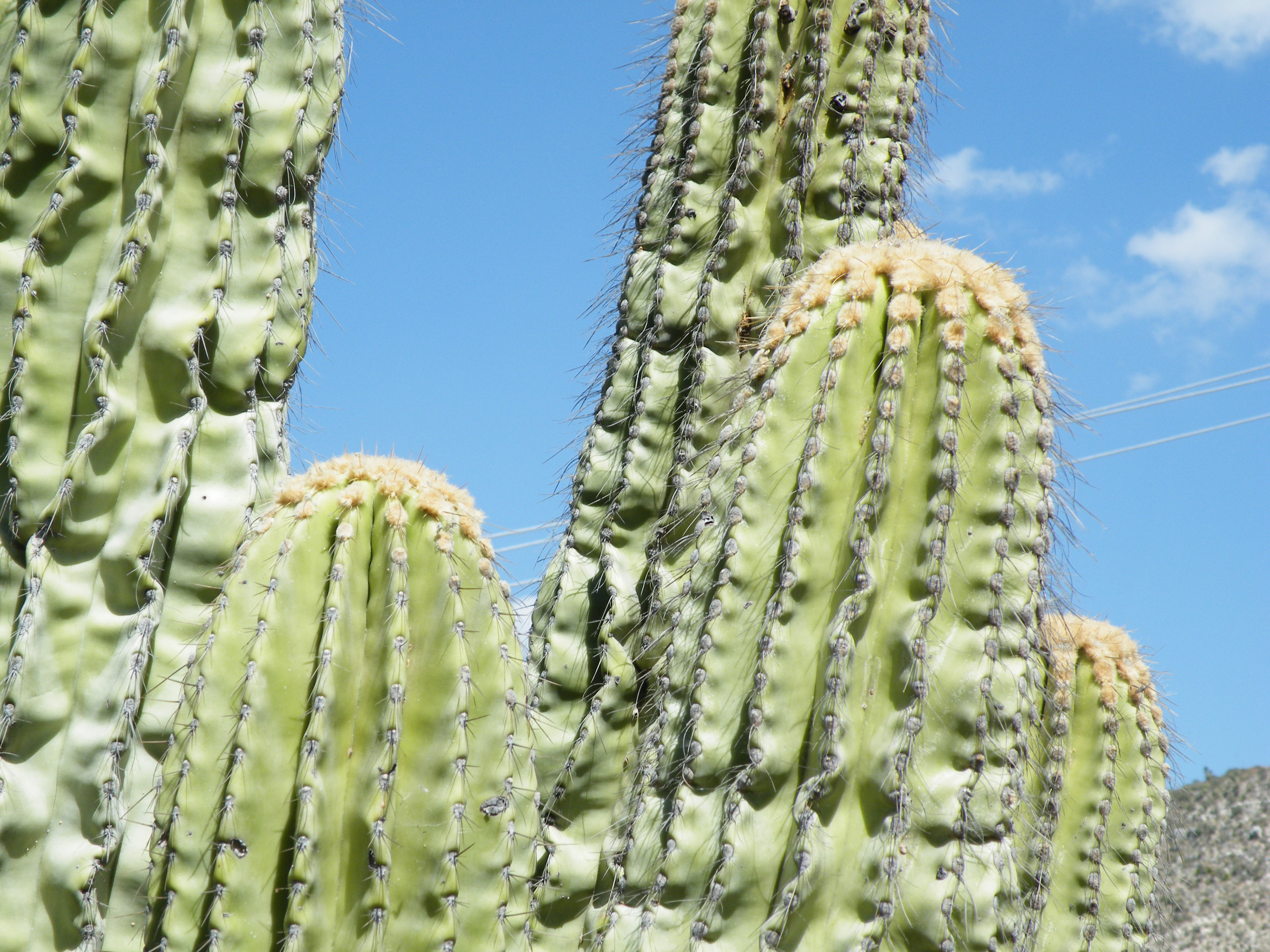

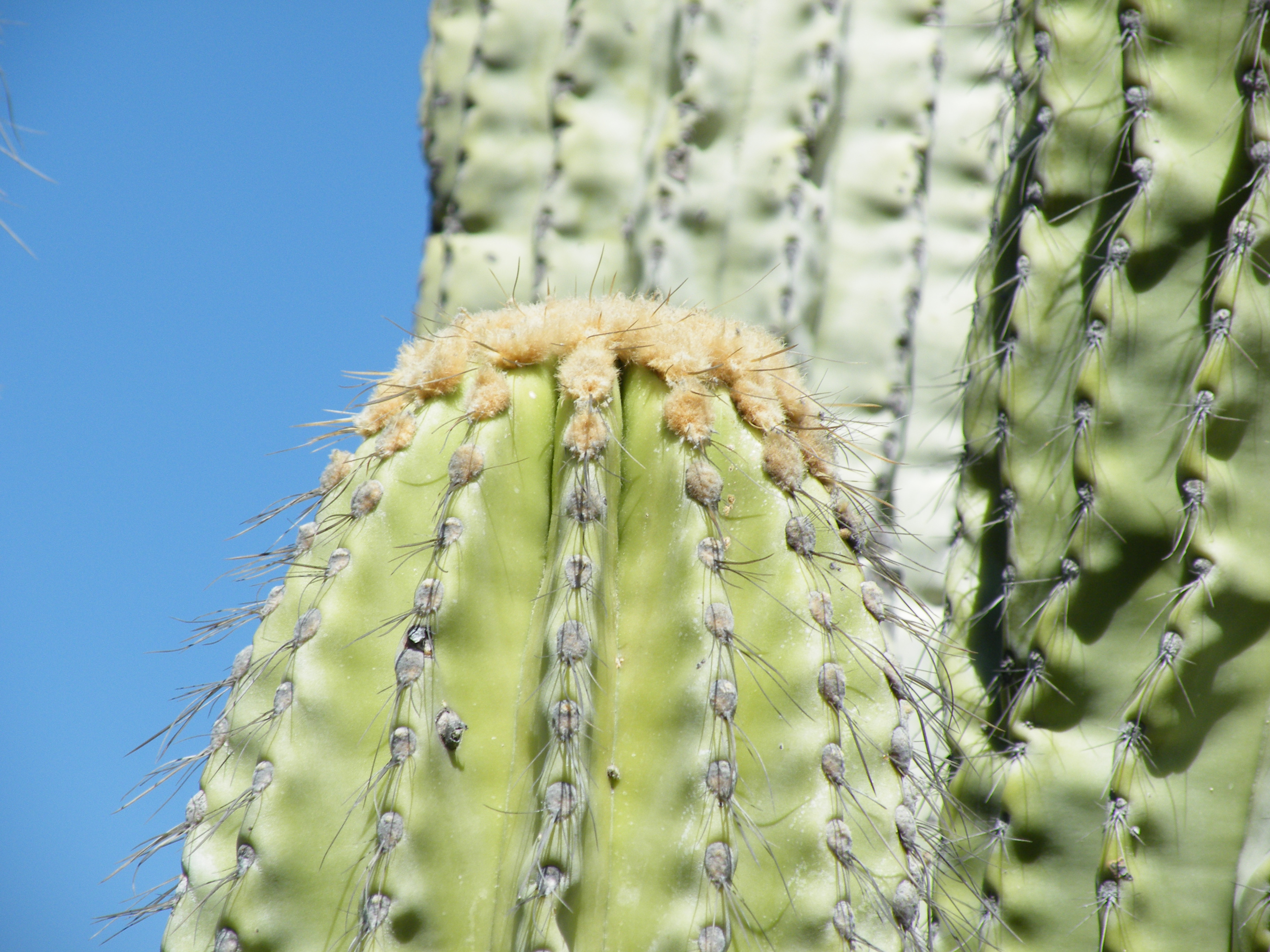

== Distribution ==
Cephalocereus fulviceps is distributed in the Mexican state of Puebla.

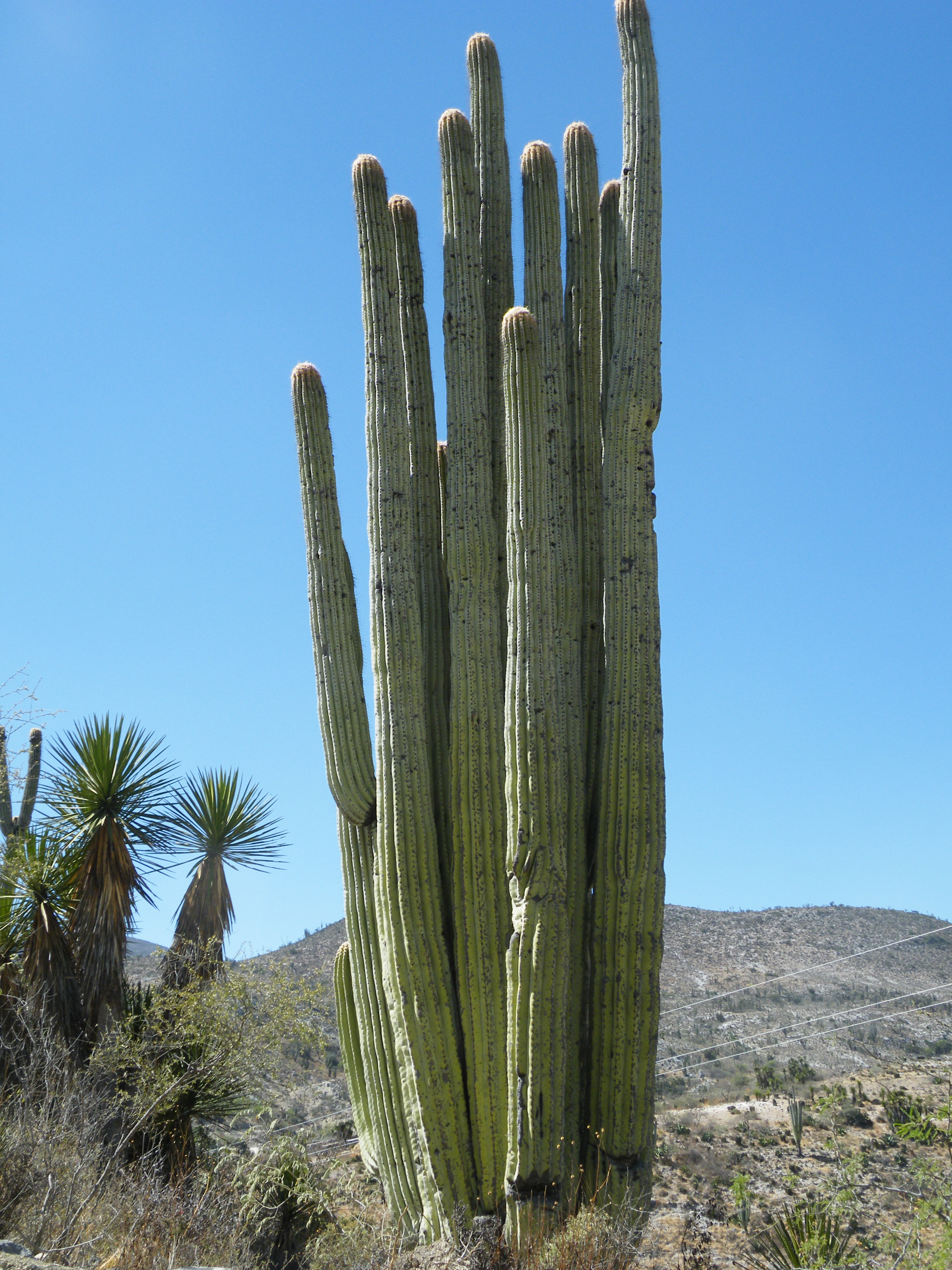
Habitat in North Zapotitlan, Puebla

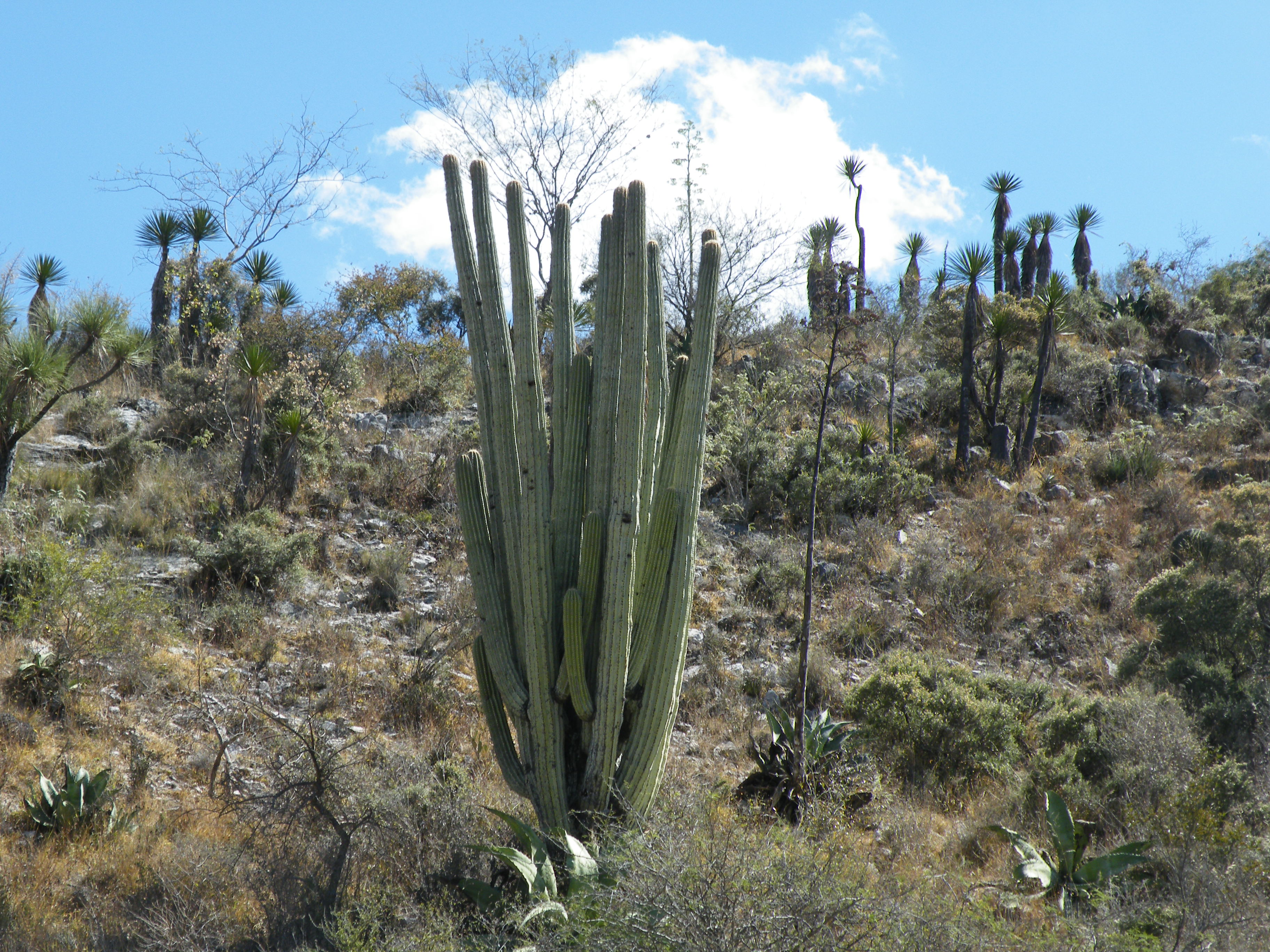
Habitat in North Zapotitlan, Puebla

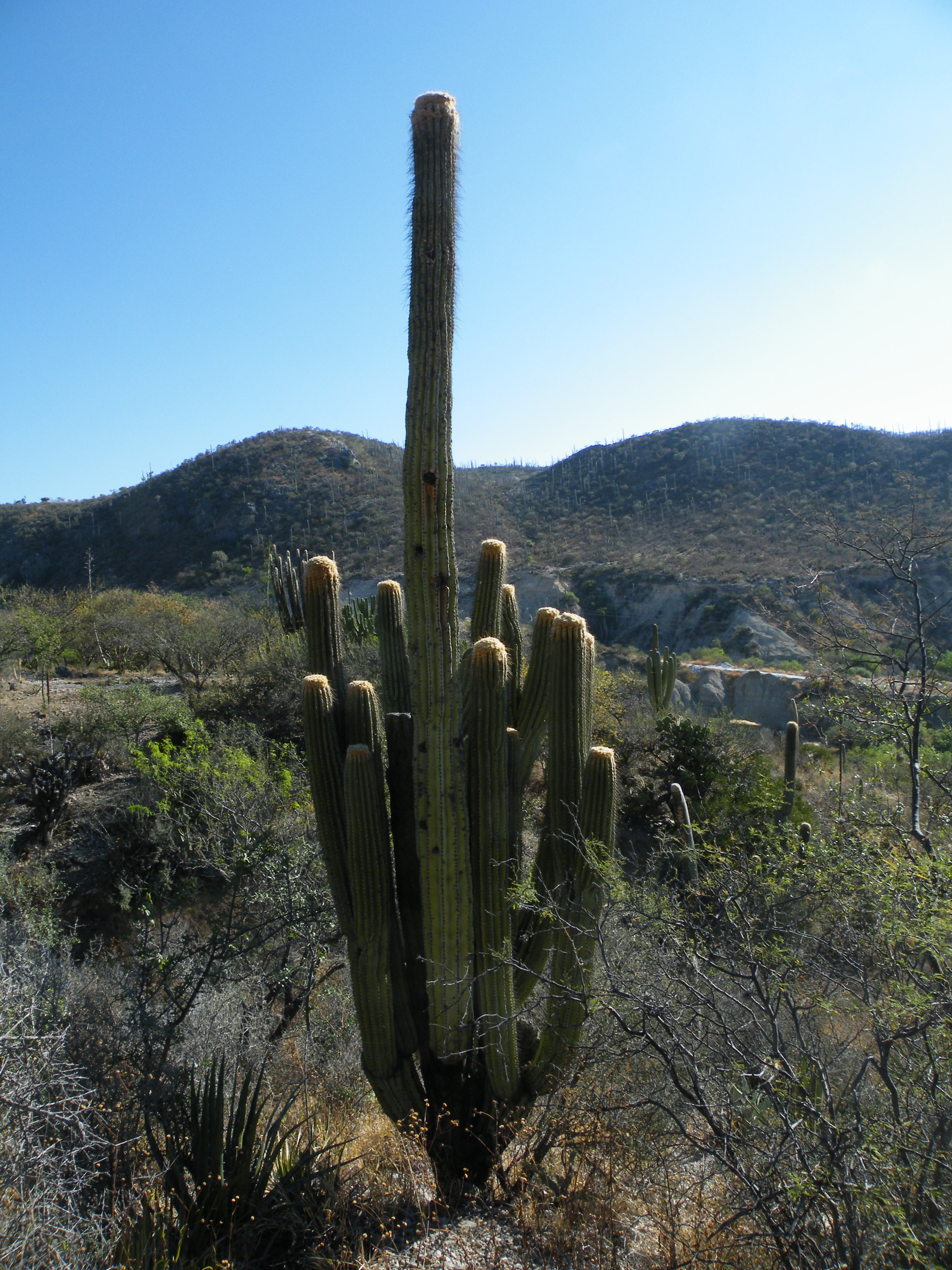
Habitat in Zapotitlan De Las Salinas, Puebla

== Taxonomy ==
The first description as Pilocereus fulviceps was made in 1897 by Karl Moritz Schumann. The specific epithet fulviceps is derived from the Latin words fulvus for 'yellowish brown' and -ceps for 'headed' and refers to the color of the cephalium. Harold Emery Moore placed the species in the genus Cephalocereus in 1975. Further nomenclature synonyms are Cereus fulviceps (F.A.C.Weber) A.Berger (1905), Mitrocereus fulviceps (F.A.C.Weber ex K.Schum.) Backeb. ex Bravo (1954), Pseudomitrocereus fulviceps (F.A.C.Weber ex K.Schum.) Bravo & Buxb. (1961), Pachycereus fulviceps (F.A.C.Weber ex K.Schum.) D.R.Hunt (1991) and Carnegiea fulviceps (F.A.C.Weber ex K.Schum.) P.V.Heath (1992).
