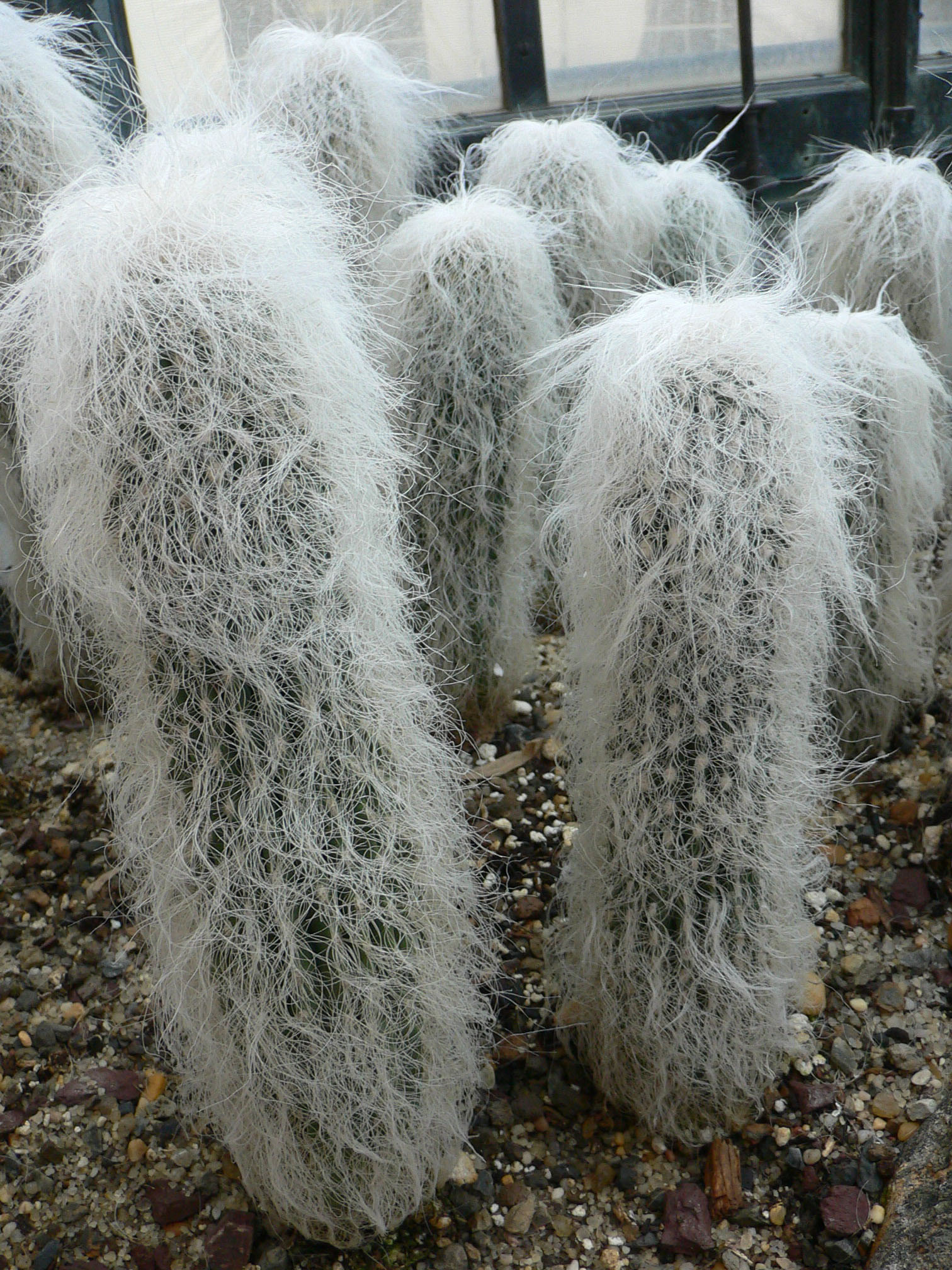
- Cephalocereus senilis

Scientific classification
- Kingdom: Plantae
- Clade: Tracheophytes
- Clade: Angiosperms
- Clade: Eudicots
- Order: Caryophyllales
- Family: Cactaceae
- Subfamily: Cactoideae
- Tribe: Echinocereeae
- Genus: Cephalocereus; Pfeiff.

Type species
- Cephalocereus senilis

Species
- See text.

Synonyms
- Cephalophorus Lem.; Haseltonia Backeb.; Neobuxbaumia Backeb.; Neodawsonia Backeb.; Pilocereus Lem., nom. superfl.; Pseudomitrocereus Bravo & Buxb.; Rooksbya (Backeb.) Backeb.

= Cephalocereus =

Genus of cacti

Cephalocereus is a genus of slow-growing, columnar-shaped, blue-green cacti. The genus is native to Mexico.

== Description ==
These cacti show a columnar and upright growth habit, and may be branched or unbranched reaching heights of 10 to 12 meters. The light green shoots, which turn gray with age, have a diameter of up to 40 centimeters and are almost completely covered by dense thorns near the top. On the 12 to 30 (or more) vertical ribs are closely spaced dimorphic areoles. The up to 5 central spines are yellowish to gray and up to 4 centimeters long. The numerous, bristly or hair-like radial spines usually enclose the shoot tightly. The flowers are medium-sized, tubular to bell-shaped, borne in a woolly structure called cephalium which can appear apically or laterally and open at night. The flower cup and the flower tube are covered with small scales.

The fruits are ovoid with small scales, and woolly. The smooth, pear-shaped seeds are black.

== Taxonomy ==
The genus Cephalocereus was established in 1838 by Ludwig Karl Georg Pfeiffer.

=== Species ===
As of 2025, Plants of the World Online accepted the following species:

Image	Scientific name	Distribution
	Cephalocereus apicicephalium E.Y.Dawson	Mexico (Oaxaca)
	Cephalocereus columna-trajani (Karw. ex Pfeiff.) K.Schum.	Mexico (Oaxaca and Puebla)
	Cephalocereus euphorbioides (Haw.) Britton & Rose	Mexico (Tamaulipas, Veracruz)
	Cephalocereus fulviceps (F.A.C.Weber ex K.Schum.) H.E.Moore	Mexico (Puebla, Oaxaca)
	Cephalocereus macrocephalus F.A.C.Weber ex K.Schum.	Mexico (Puebla, Oaxaca)
	Cephalocereus mezcalaensis Bravo	Mexico (Colima, Guerrero, Jalisco, México State, Michoacán, Morelos, Oaxaca, Puebla, Tlaxcala)
	Cephalocereus nudus E.Y.Dawson	Mexico
	Cephalocereus novus (P.V.Heath) M.H.J.van der Meer	Mexico (Oaxaca)
	Cephalocereus parvispinus S.Arias, H.J.Tapia & U.Guzmán	Mexico (Oaxaca)
	Cephalocereus polylophus (DC.) Britton & Rose	Mexico (Guanajuato to Veracruz)
	Cephalocereus scoparius (Poselg.) Britton & Rose	Mexico (Veracruz, Oaxaca)
	Cephalocereus senilis (Haw.) Pfeiff.	Mexico (Hidalgo and Veracruz )
	Cephalocereus tetetzo (F.A.C.Weber ex J.M.Coult.) Diguet	Mexico (Oaxaca and Puebla)

== Distribution and habitat ==
This genus of cacti is native to central and southern Mexico. Its habitat is desert scrub in the Central Mexican matorral and Southern Pacific dry forests.
