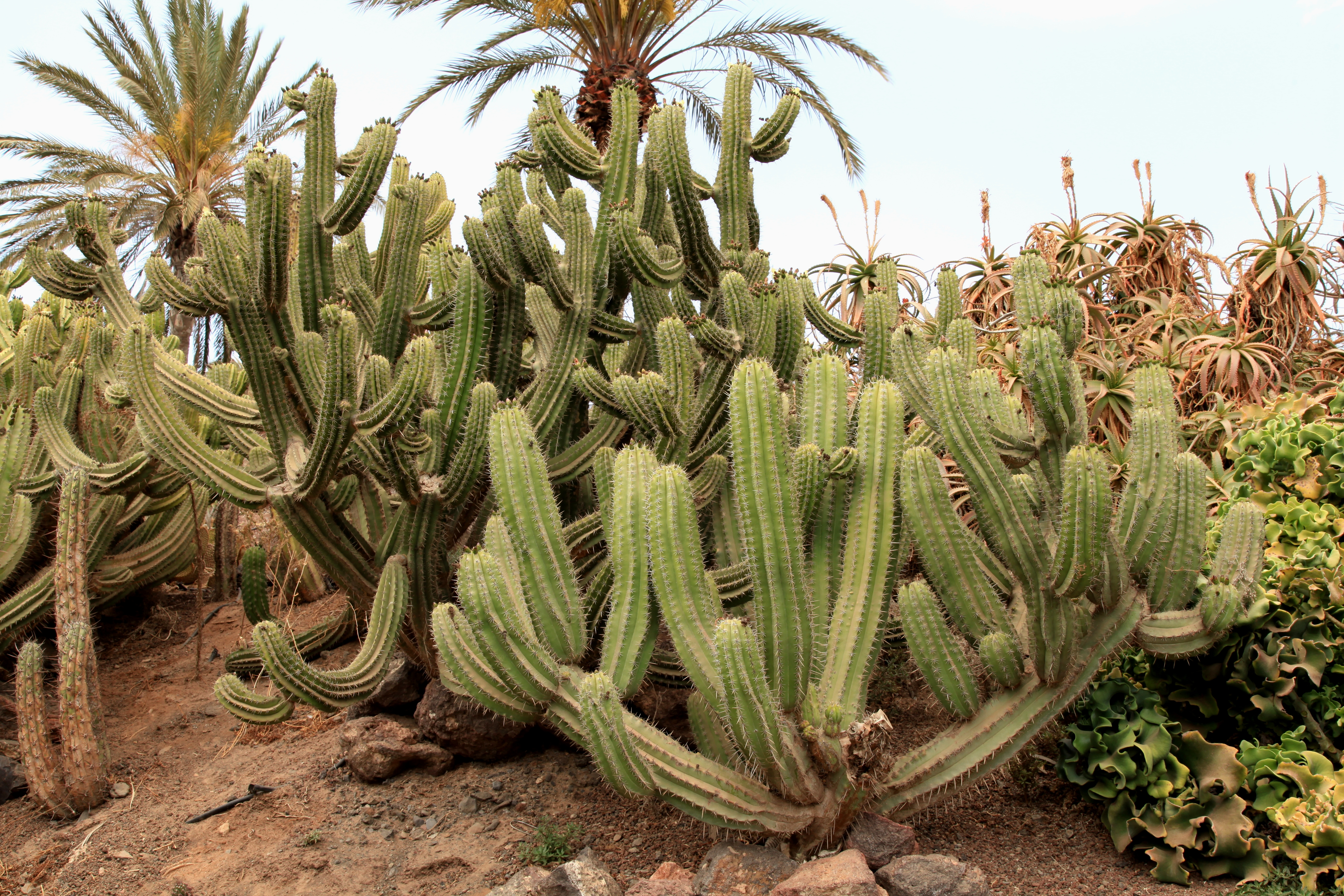

Conservation status
- Least Concern (IUCN 3.1)

Scientific classification
- Kingdom: Plantae
- Clade: Tracheophytes
- Clade: Angiosperms
- Clade: Eudicots
- Order: Caryophyllales
- Family: Cactaceae
- Subfamily: Cactoideae
- Genus: Polaskia
- Species: P. chichipe

Binomial name
- Polaskia chichipe (Rol-.Goss.) A.C.Gibson & K.E.Horak

Synonyms
- Cereus chichipe Rol.-Goss. 1905; Lemaireocereus chichipe (Gosselin) Britton & Rose 1920; Myrtillocactus chichipe (Rol.-Goss.) P.V.Heath 1992; Cereus mixtecensis J.A.Purpus 1909; Lemaireocereus mixtecensis Britton & Rose 1909

= Polaskia chichipe =

Species of cactus

Polaskia chichipe is a succulent cactus native to Mexico.

== Description ==
Polaskia chichipe forms short main stem, Terminal branches 7 to 9 cm wide, slightly arched, light green, form a compact crown, 2-5 meter tall branching stems near the shoot tips with spines. It reaches heights of growth of 3 to 5 m tall and sometimes forms a clear trunk. The green, slightly curved shoots are less than 1 meter long and have a diameter of up to 7 centimeters.There are 9 to 12 sharp-edged ribs, 1 to 2 cm high, that are slightly curved and wavy on the back and that are up to 2 centimeters high. The areoles are 3 to 5 mm long, 1 to 1.5 centimeters apart. The spines are gray with a darker tip. The single central spine is up to 1.5 centimeters, the 6 to 8 radial spines 0.3 to 1.5 centimeters long.

The yellowish green to creamy white flowers open at night. They are 2 to 4 centimeters long, 3 cm long and reach a diameter of 3 to 4 centimeters. The bracts 3 to 4 mm long and 4 mm wide, ovate, fleshy, spines less than 1 mm long. External tepals 1 to 1.4 cm long, 0.3 to 0.5 cm wide, oblong, revolute (leaves that curve at their edges towards the underside or external face thereof), yellowish white; internal tepals 1.2 to 1.8 cm long and about 0.3 cm wide; stamens 0.8 to 1.5 cm long; style 1. 3 to 1.5 cm long.

The spherical fruits are deep reddish purple, 2 to 3.3 cm long and 1.5 to 3 cm wide, globose, red, deciduous areoles when ripe, spines 5 to 7, 2 to 4 mm long, purple-red flesh; seeds 1.2 to 1.4 mm long that bloom between March and June.

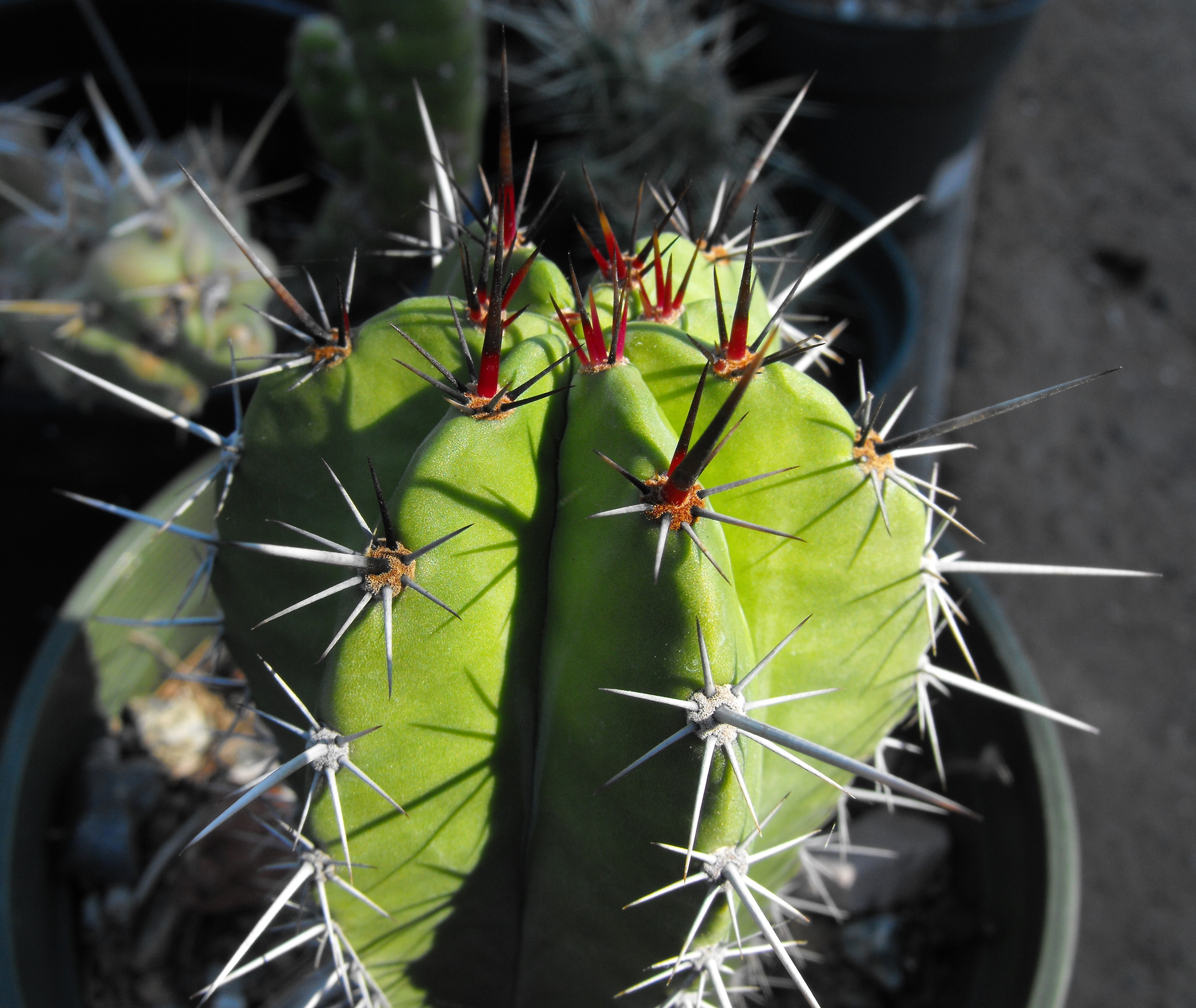
terminal branch tip

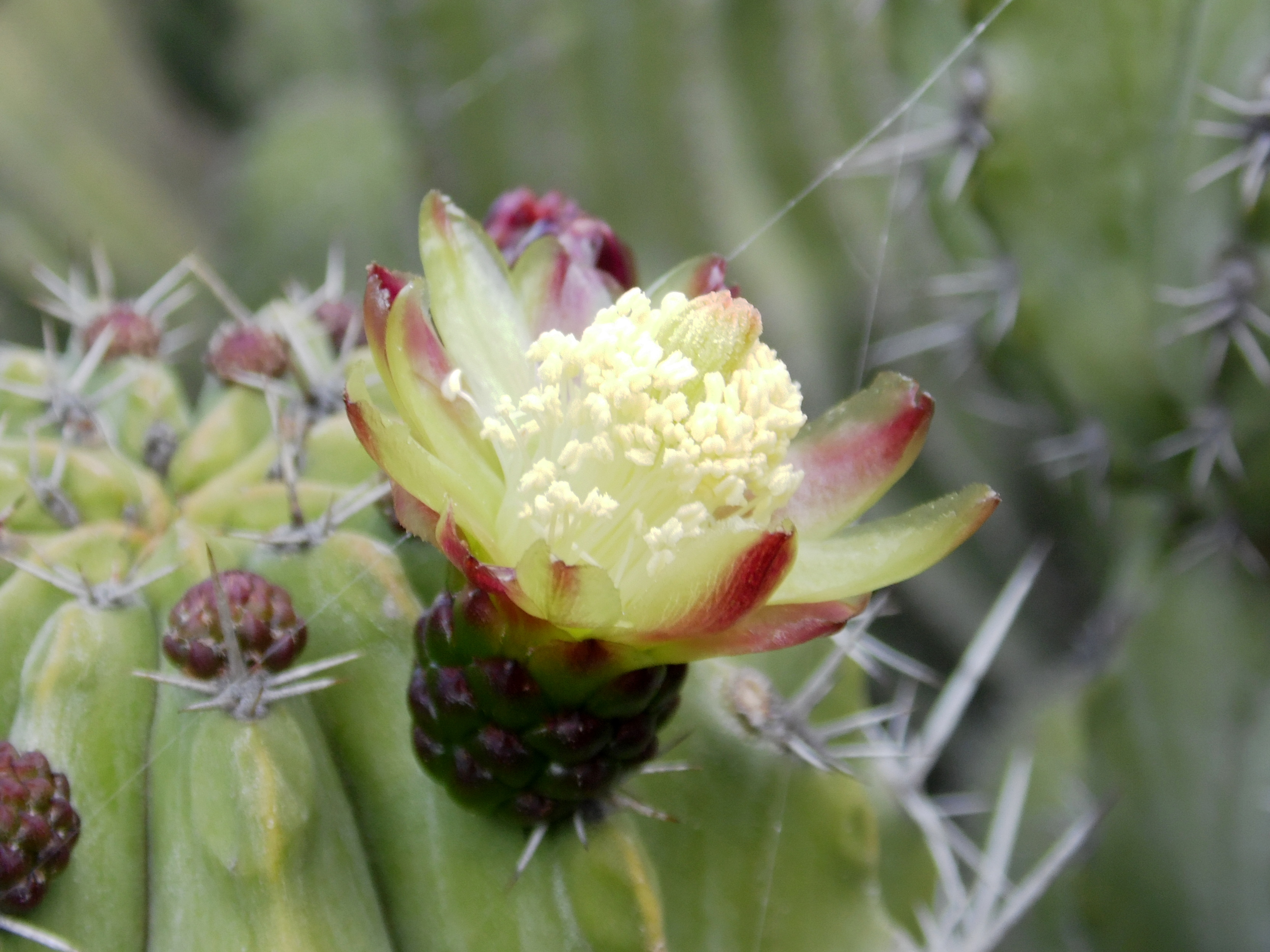
Flower

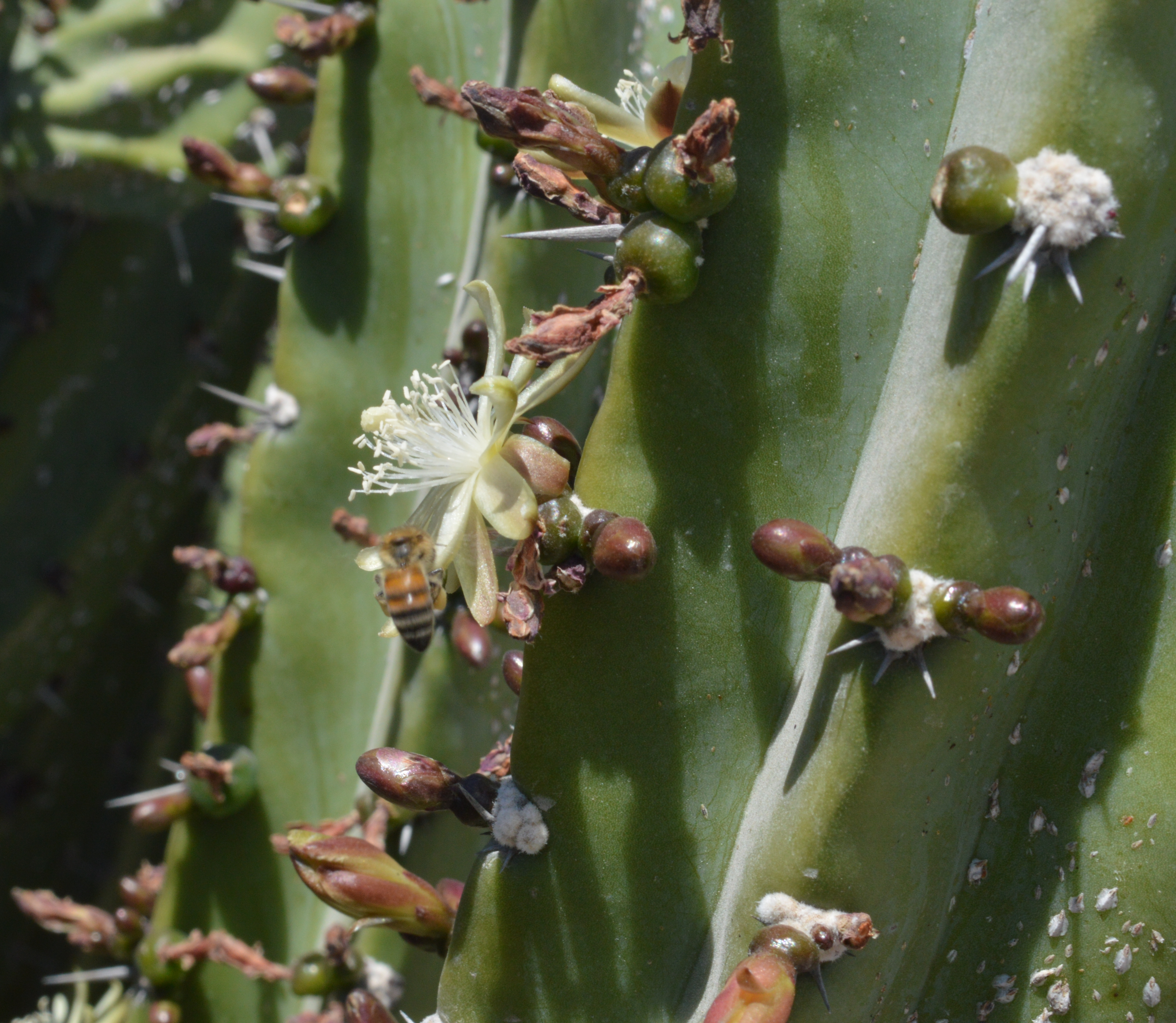
Flowers and buds

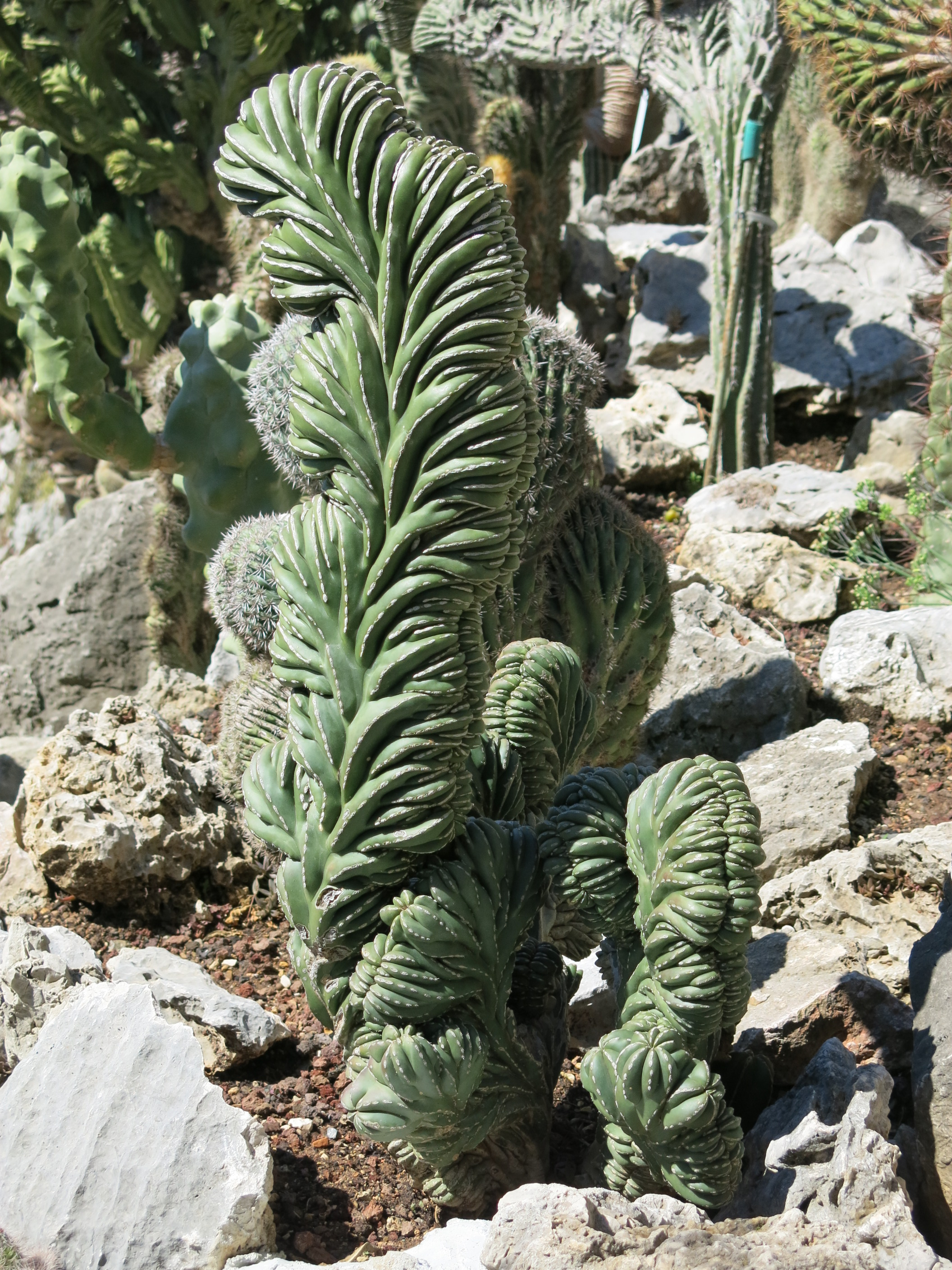
Crested plant

== Distribution ==
Polaskia chichipe is found in a small area of mountains of northern Oaxaca, Michoacán, and southern Puebla, Mexico. It grows in xerophytic shrubland between 1,600 and 2,300 meters above sea level. It is found growing along Cephalocereus mezcalaensis, Polaskia chende, Mammillaria haageana subsp. haageana, Ferocactus robustus, Agave karwinskii, Agave lechuguilla and Yucca periculosa.

== Taxonomy ==
The species was first described as Cereus chichipe by Robert Roland-Gosselin in 1905. The specific name "chichipe" comes from a common name in Spanish. In 1949, Curt Backeberg reclassified the species into the genus Polaskia.
