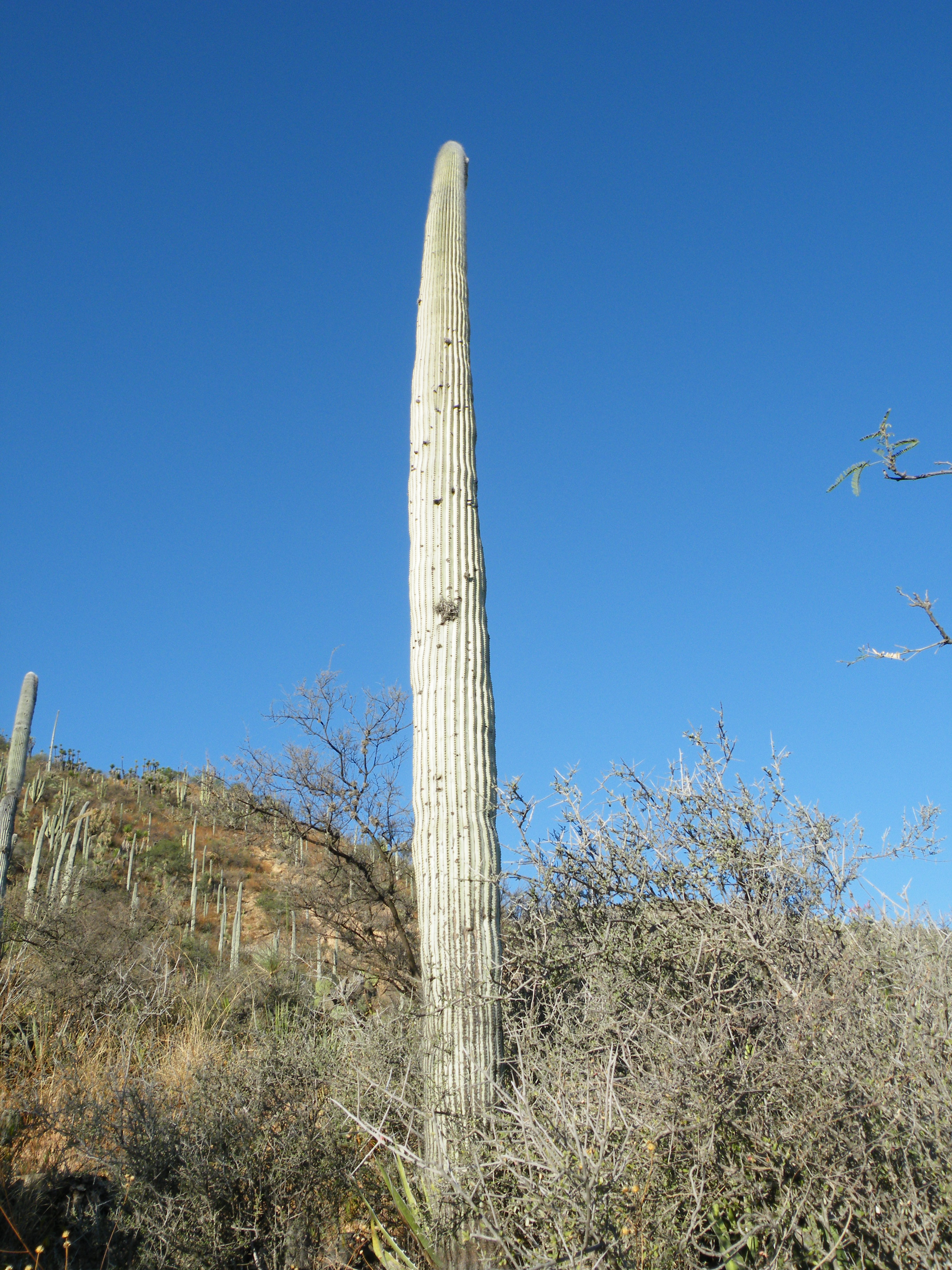

Conservation status
- Least Concern (IUCN 3.1)

Scientific classification
- Kingdom: Plantae
- Clade: Tracheophytes
- Clade: Angiosperms
- Clade: Eudicots
- Order: Caryophyllales
- Family: Cactaceae
- Subfamily: Cactoideae
- Genus: Cephalocereus
- Species: C. columna-trajani

Binomial name
- Cephalocereus columna-trajani (Karw. ex Pfeiff.) K.Schum., 1897

Synonyms
- List: Cephalocereus columna (Walp.) K.Schum. (1894); Cephalophorus columna-trajani (Karw. ex Pfeiff.) Lem. (1838); Cephalocereus hoppenstedii (J.N.Haage & E.Schmidt) K.Schum. (1894); Cereus columna Walp. (1846); Cereus columna-trajani Karw. ex Pfeiff. (1837); Cereus hoppenstedtii (J.N.Haage & E.Schmidt) Mottet (1898); Cereus lateribarbatus Lem. (1862); Haseltonia columna-trajani (Karw. ex Pfeiff.) Backeb. (1960); Haseltonia hoppenstedtii (J.N.Haage & E.Schmidt) Backeb. (1951); Melocactus columna-trajani Pfeiff. (1837); Mitrocereus columna-trajani (Karw. ex Pfeiff.) E.Y.Dawson (1948); Pachycereus columna-trajani (Karw. ex Pfeiff.) Britton & Rose (1909); Pilocereus columna (Karw. ex Pfeiff.) Lem. (1839); Pilocereus hoppenstedtii J.N.Haage & E.Schmidt (1874); Pilocereus lateralis F.A.C.Weber (1898); Pilocereus lateribarbatus Pfeiff. ex C.F.Först. & Rümpler (1885)

= Cephalocereus columna-trajani =

Mexican species of cactus

Cephalocereus columna-trajani is a species of cactus from Mexico.

== Description ==
Cephalocereus columna-trajani grows with non-branching green shoots and reaches heights of 6 to 10 meters with diameters of up to 40 centimeters. There are 16 to 26 ribs, which are almost completely divided into cusps by transverse furrows. Abundant white, silky hairs emerge from the white areoles near the tip of the shoot. The 5 to 8 downward-facing, stiff central spines are grayish and up to 8 centimeters long. The 14 to 18 white marginal spines are up to 1 centimeter long. The clearly lateral, narrow, 2 to 3 meter long pseudocephalium extends to the top of the shoot and is usually directed north. It consists of yellowish, woolly hairs 4 to 6 centimeters long.

The tubular to bell-shaped flowers are white to light yellow and have a length of up to 7.5 centimeters and the same diameter.

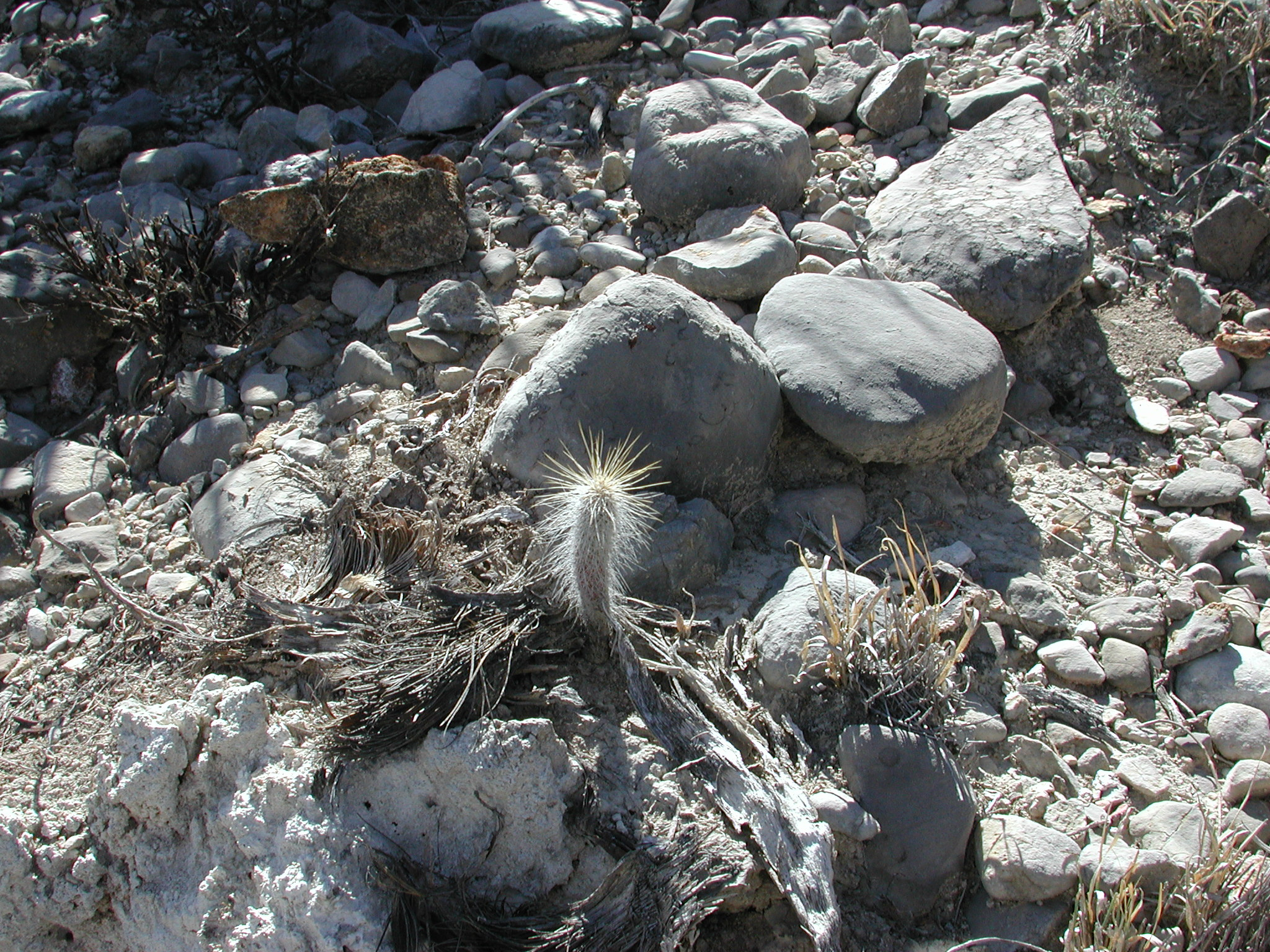
seedling

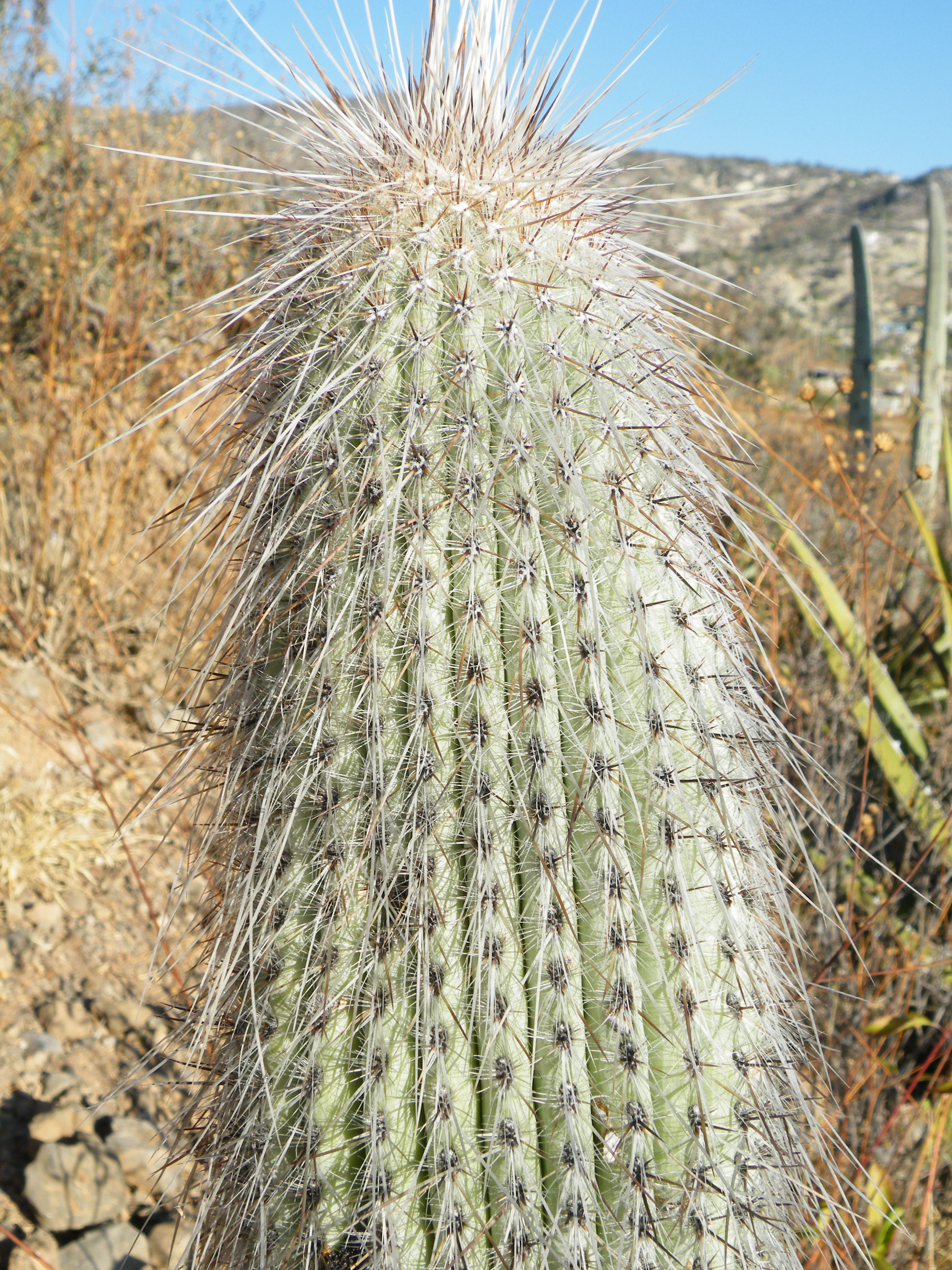
Spines

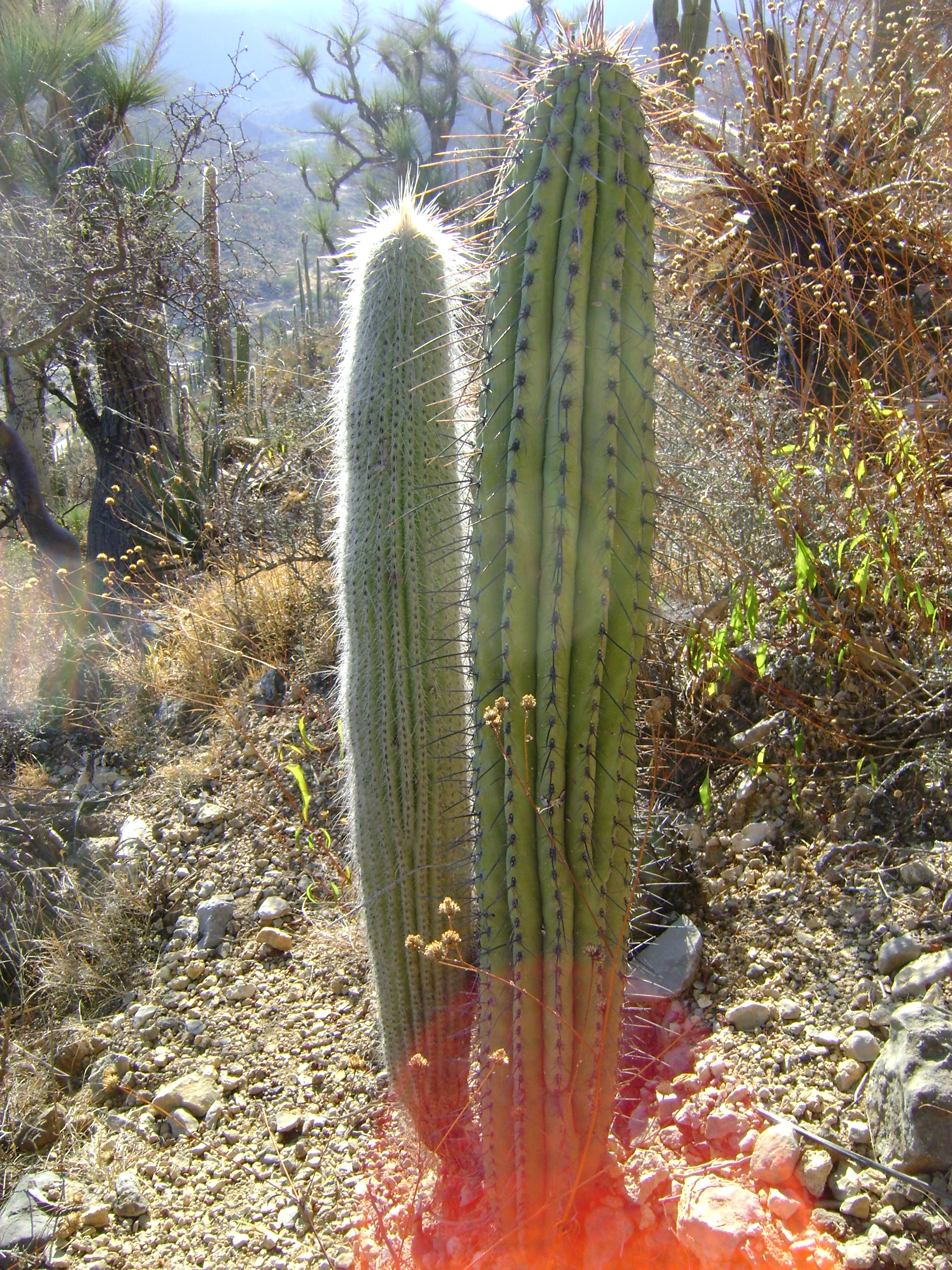
Small Plant

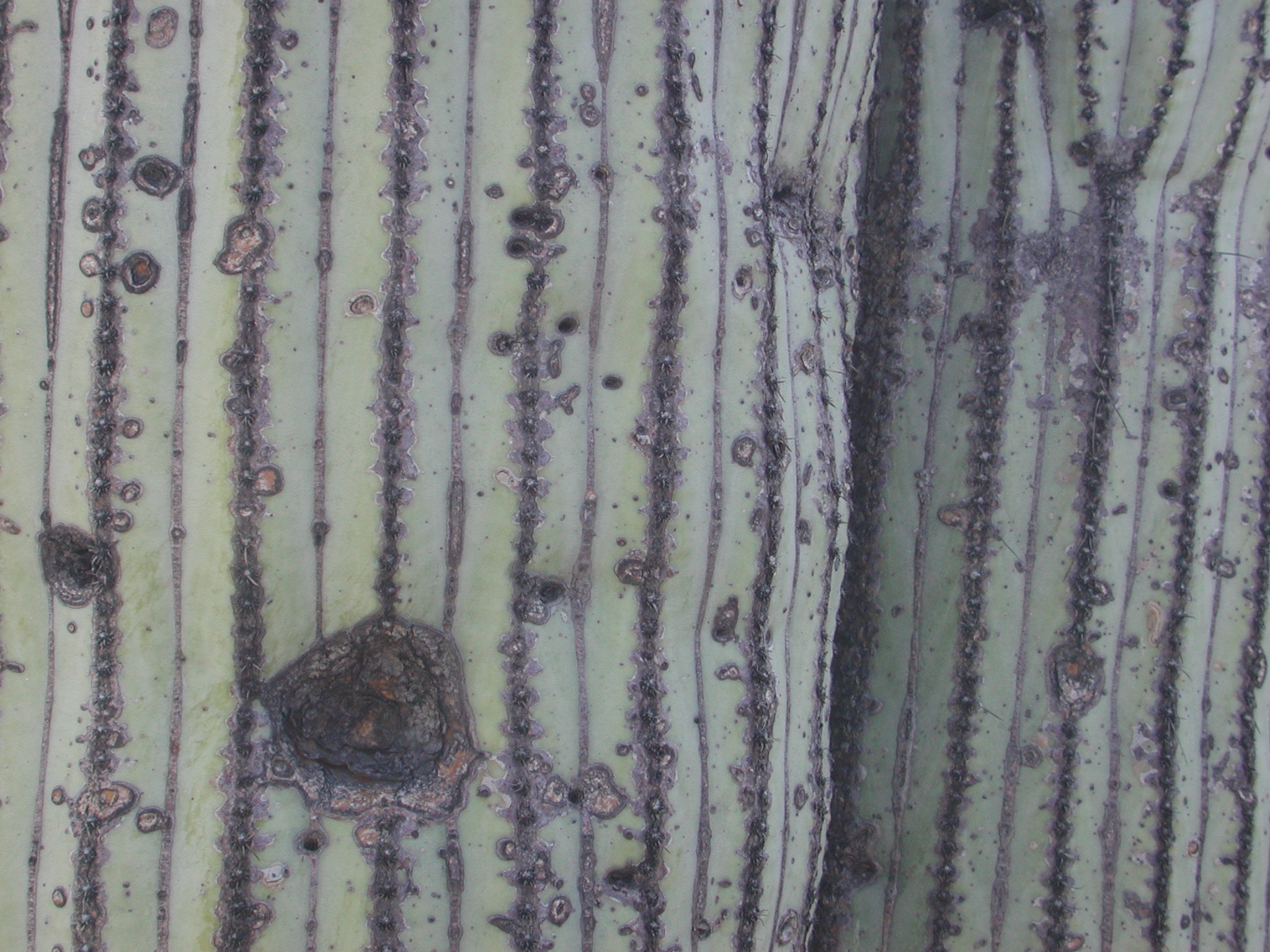
Skin

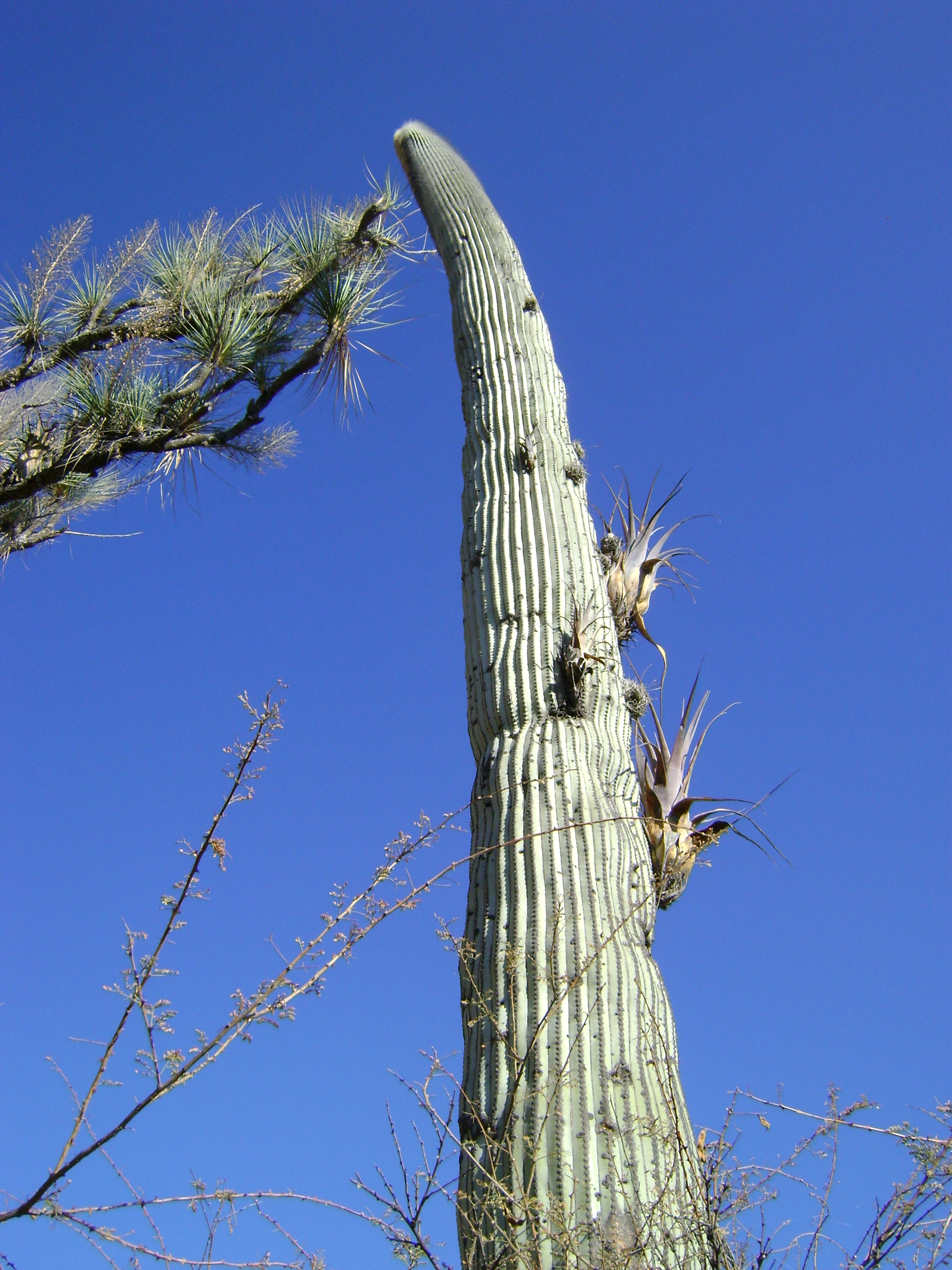
adult plant

== Distribution ==
Cephalocereus columna-trajani is found in xerophyllous scrub habitat in the Mexican states of Oaxaca and Puebla at elevations between 600 and 1800 meters, where it forms dense forests. Plants are found growing along with Cephalocereus tetetzo, Coryphantha pallida, Mammillaria haageana and Mammillaria mystax.

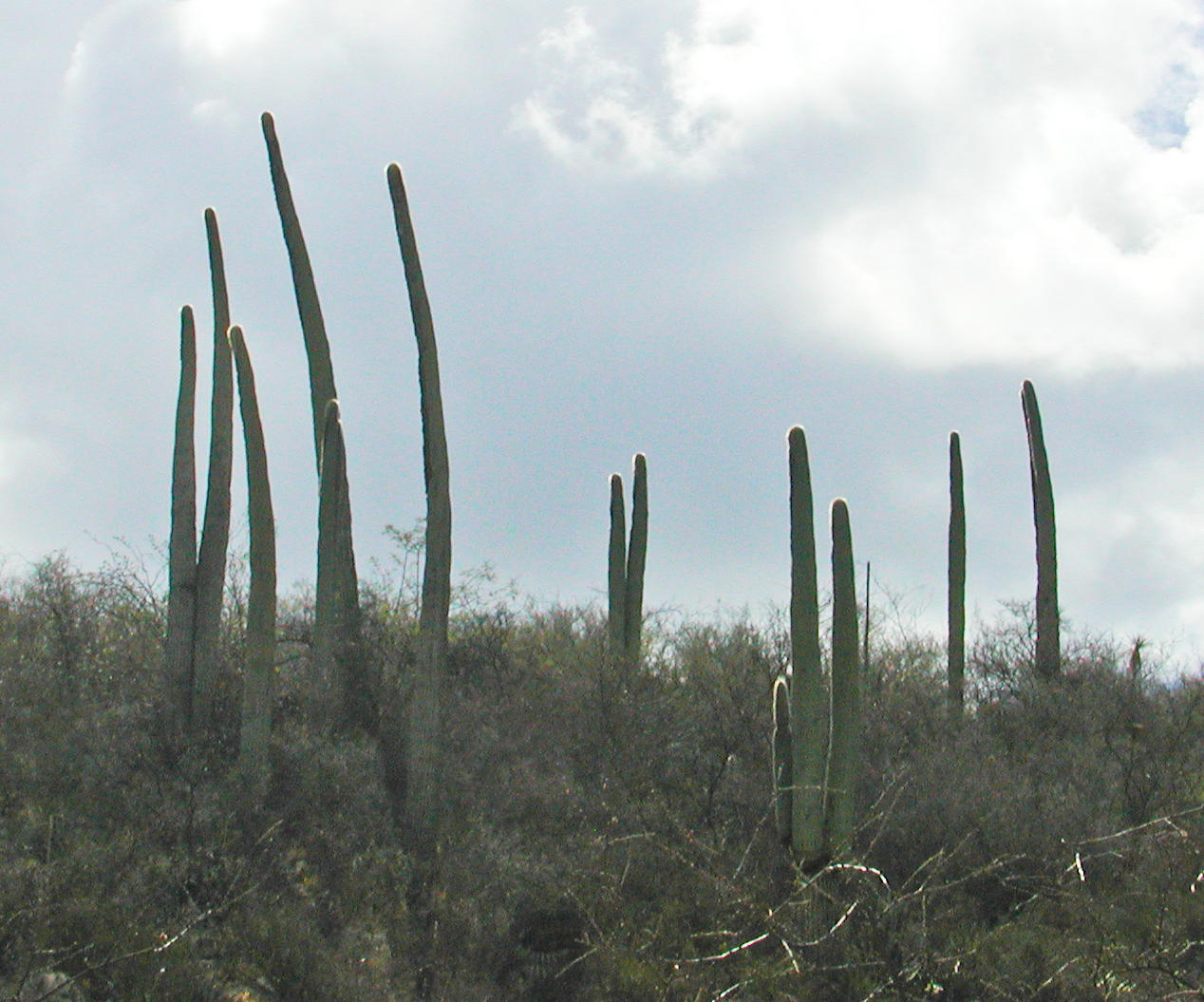
Habitat in near Tehuacán, southeastern Puebla state, Central México.

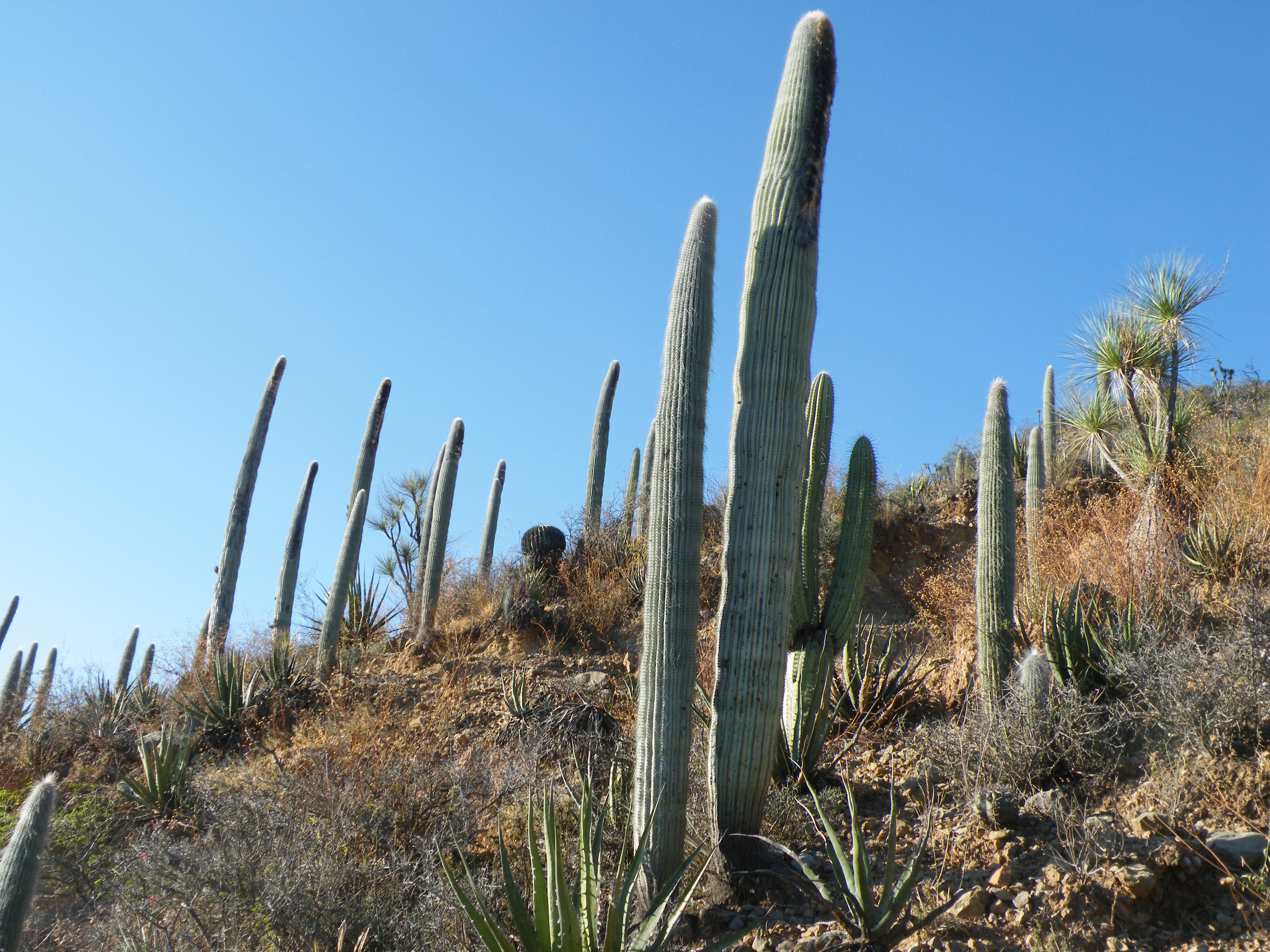
Habitat in Zapotitlan De Las Salinas, Puebla

== Taxonomy ==
The first description as Cereus columna-trajani was published in 1837 by Ludwig Georg Karl Pfeiffer. The specific epithet columna-trajani comes from Latin, means 'Trajan's Column' and refers to the stately nature of the species. Karl Moritz Schumann placed the species in the genus Cephalocereus in 1897. Further nomenclature synonyms are Cephalophorus columna-trajani (Karw. ex Pfeiff.) Lem. (1831), Pilocereus columnatrajani (Karw. ex Pfeiff.) Lem. (1839), Cephalocereus columna (Karw. ex Pfeiff.) K.Schum. (1894), Pachycereus columnatrajani (Karw. ex Pfeiff.) Britton & Rose (1909), Mitrocereus columna-trajani (Karw. ex Pfeiff.) Backeb. ex E.Y.Dawson (1948) and Haseltonia columna-trajani (Karw. ex Pfeiff.) Backeb. (1960).
