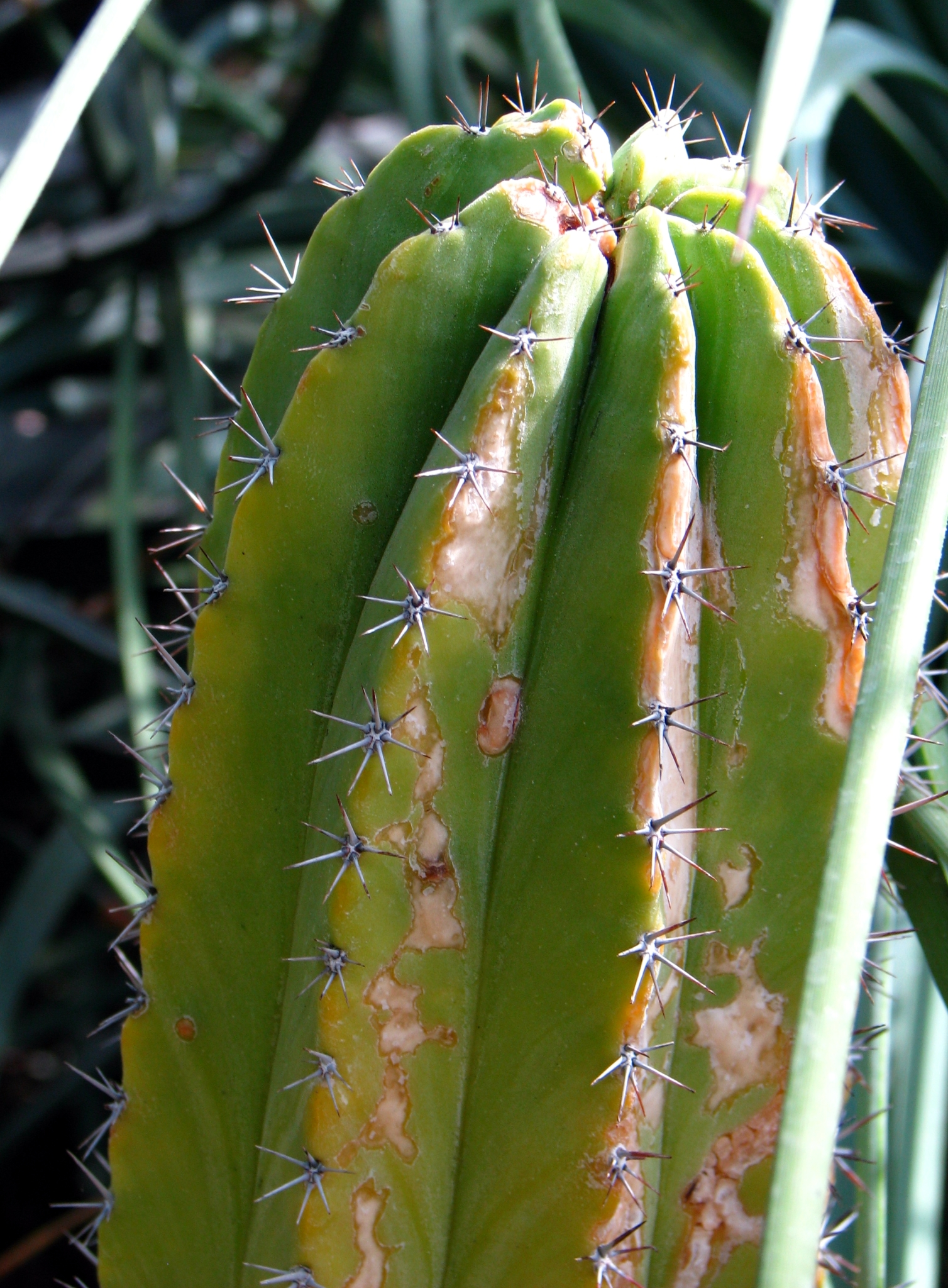
- Polaskia chichipe

Scientific classification
- Kingdom: Plantae
- Clade: Tracheophytes
- Clade: Angiosperms
- Clade: Eudicots
- Order: Caryophyllales
- Family: Cactaceae
- Subfamily: Cactoideae
- Tribe: Echinocereeae
- Genus: Polaskia; Backeb.

Species
- Polaskia chende - chende, chinoa; Polaskia chichipe - chichipe, chichibe, chichituna

Synonyms
- Chichipia Backeb. (nom. inval.); Heliabravoa Backeb.

= Polaskia =

Genus of cacti

Polaskia (named after American amateur Charles Polaski) is a genus of tree-like cacti reaching 4–5 m high, comprising 2 species. Both present primitive characteristics, but Polaskia chichipe is nearer to Myrtillocactus while Polaskia chende is nearer to Stenocereus. The genus is found in the Mexican states of Puebla and Oaxaca.

== Description ==
The tree-like, highly branched species of the Polaskia genus reach heights of growth of between 4 and 5 meters and form dense crowns 3 to 4 meters above the ground. Its bright green shoots repeatedly fork and grow 1 to 2 meters long. The 7 to 12 ribs are sharply triangular in cross-section. On their edges, these wear 3 to 4 millimeters wide, shield-shaped areoles at close intervals. The central spine may be absent. The 3 to 8 radial spines are greyish to blackish.

The urn- to bell-shaped flowers are white to creamy white to yellowish green. They open day and night and are between 4 and 6 centimeters long.

The red, spherical fruits with a diameter of 2 to 4 centimeters are juicy and edible. The small seeds it contains are pear- to ovoid-shaped and dull black.

== Synonymy ==
The following genera have been brought into synonymy with Polaskia:

- Chichipia Backeb. (nom. inval.)
- Heliabravoa Backeb.

== Extant Species ==
Species as of 2021:

Image	Scientific name	Common name	Distribution
	Polaskia chende	chende, chinoa	Oaxaca & Puebla Mexico
	Polaskia chichipe	chichipe, chichibe, chichituna	Oaxaca & Puebla Mexico
