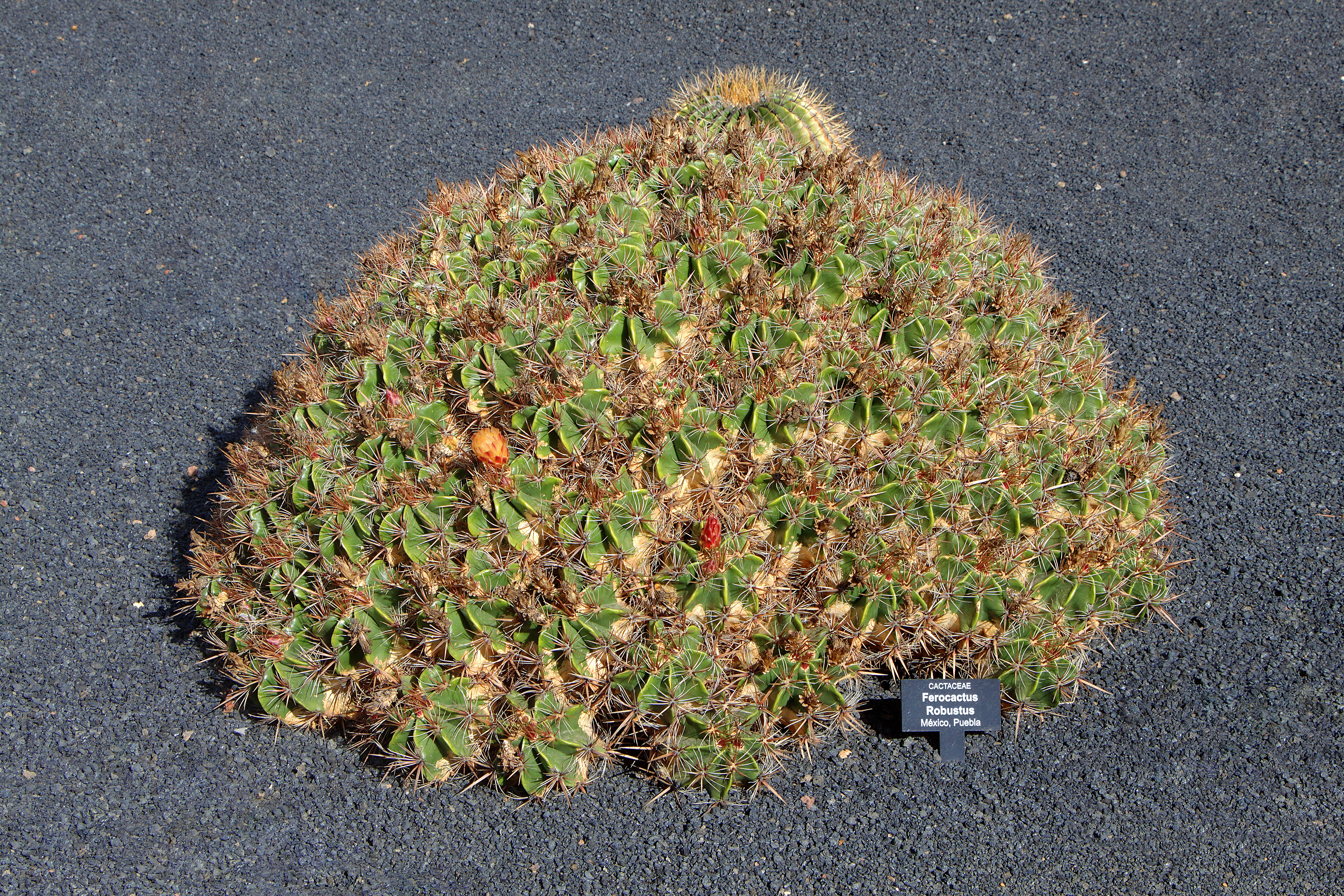

Conservation status
- Vulnerable (IUCN 3.1)

Scientific classification
- Kingdom: Plantae
- Clade: Tracheophytes
- Clade: Angiosperms
- Clade: Eudicots
- Order: Caryophyllales
- Family: Cactaceae
- Subfamily: Cactoideae
- Genus: Ferocactus
- Species: F. robustus

Binomial name
- Ferocactus robustus (Pfeiffer) Britton & Rose, 1922

Synonyms
- Echinocactus robustus Otto ex Pfeiff. 1837; Echinofossulocactus robustus (Otto ex Pfeiff.) Lawr. 1841; Echinocactus agglomeratus Karw. ex Pfeiff. 1837; Echinocactus robustus var. monstruosus Pfeiff. 1837; Echinocactus robustus var. prolifer Pfeiff. 1837; Echinocactus subulifer Link & Otto 1827; Melocactus prolifer Otto & A.Dietr. 1833

= Ferocactus robustus =

Species of cactus

Ferocactus robustus is a barrel cactus in the genus Ferocactus of the family Cactaceae.

== Description ==
Ferocactus robustus forms large cushions reaching a height up to 100 centimetres (39 in) and a diameter up to 5 metres (16 ft). This plant is spherical to club-shaped and has eight sharp-edged tuberous ribs with a diameter of 8 to 16 centimeters. The areoles, where thorns arise, are spaced far apart. The reddish or purple thorns include four to seven strong, protruding, straight central spines up to 6 centimeters long, and 10 to 14 lighter-colored radial spines, with upper ones resembling the central spines and lower ones being bristle-like.

The funnel-shaped flowers are yellow and reach a length of 3–4 centimetres (1.2–1.6 in). The fruits are spherical, fleshy, yellow, 2 to 3 inches long.

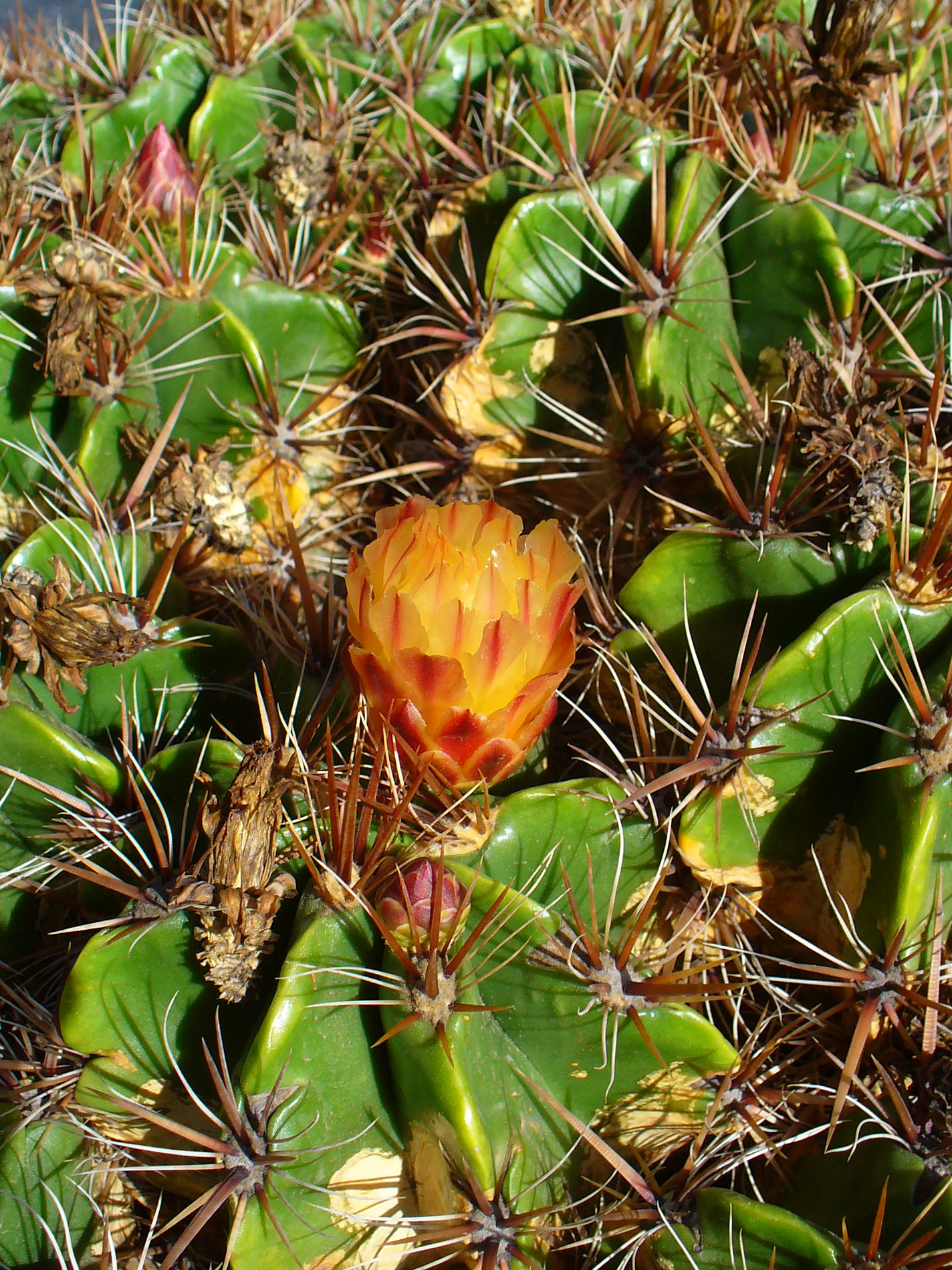
F. robustus in bloom

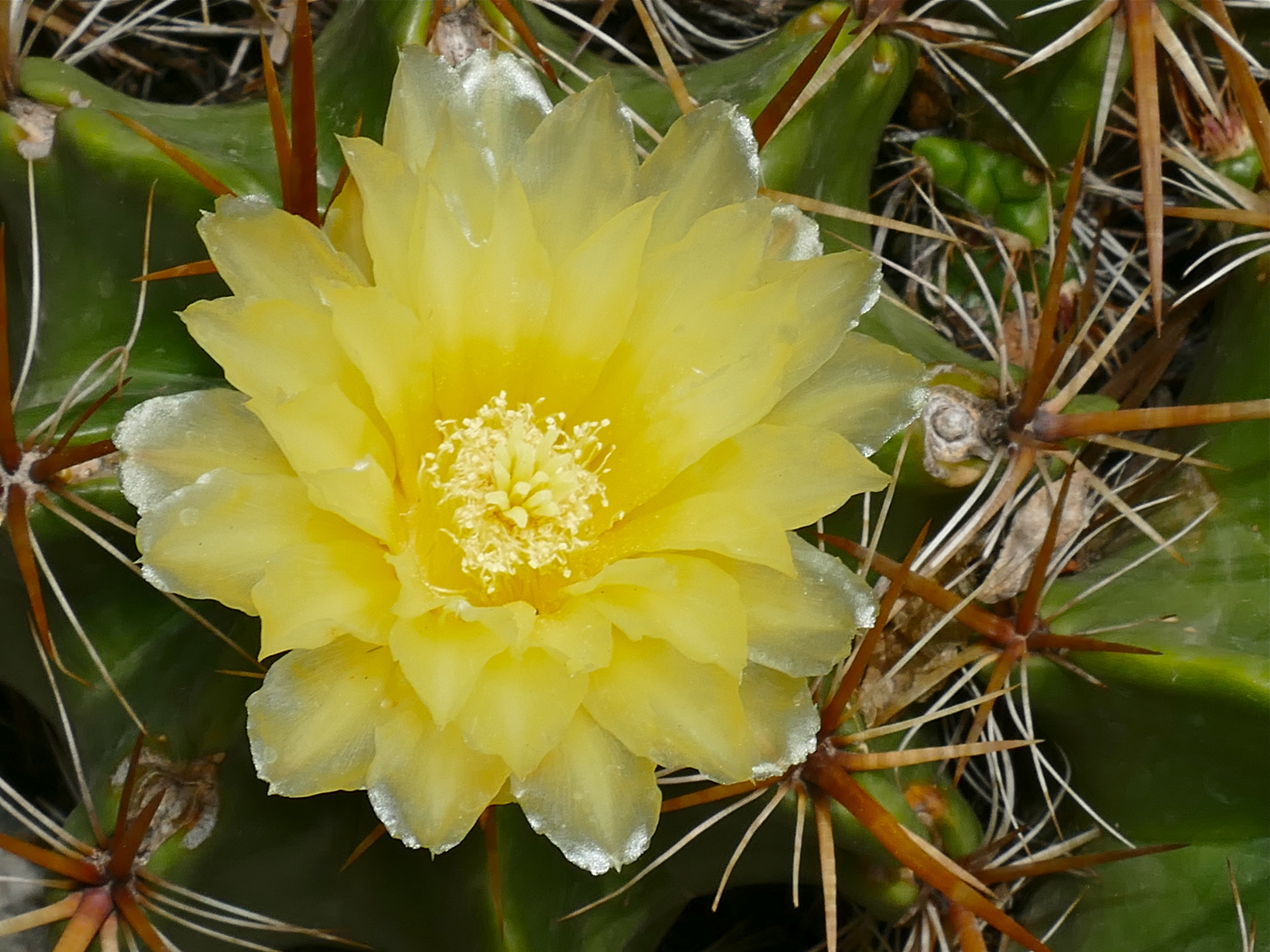
Flower

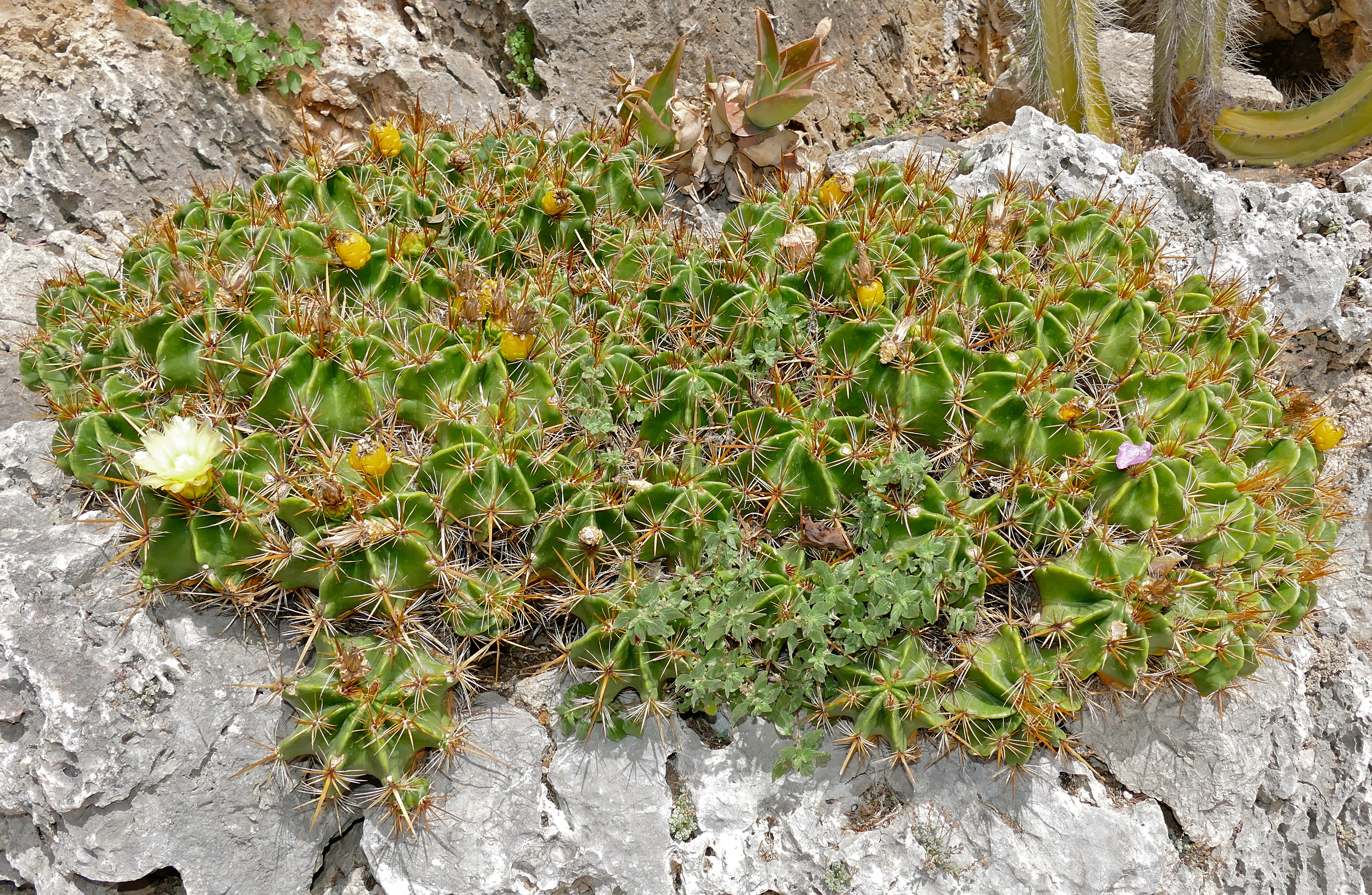
Plant cluster

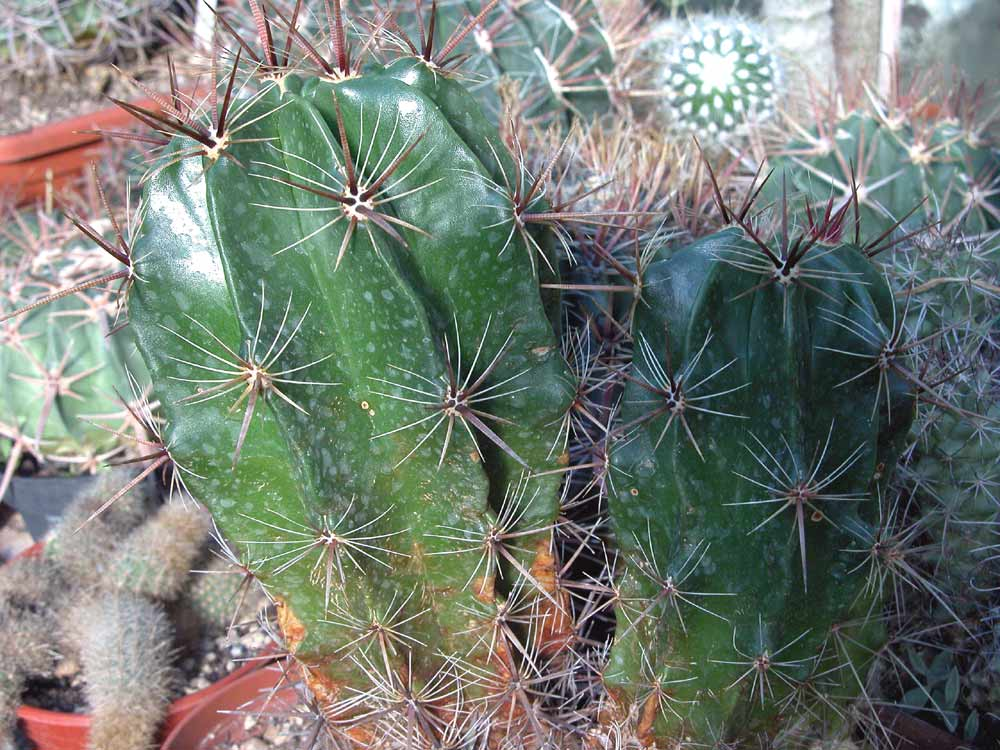
Plant

== Distribution ==
Ferocactus robustus is widespread in the states of Puebla and Veracruz in Mexico at elevations of 700 -1000 meters.

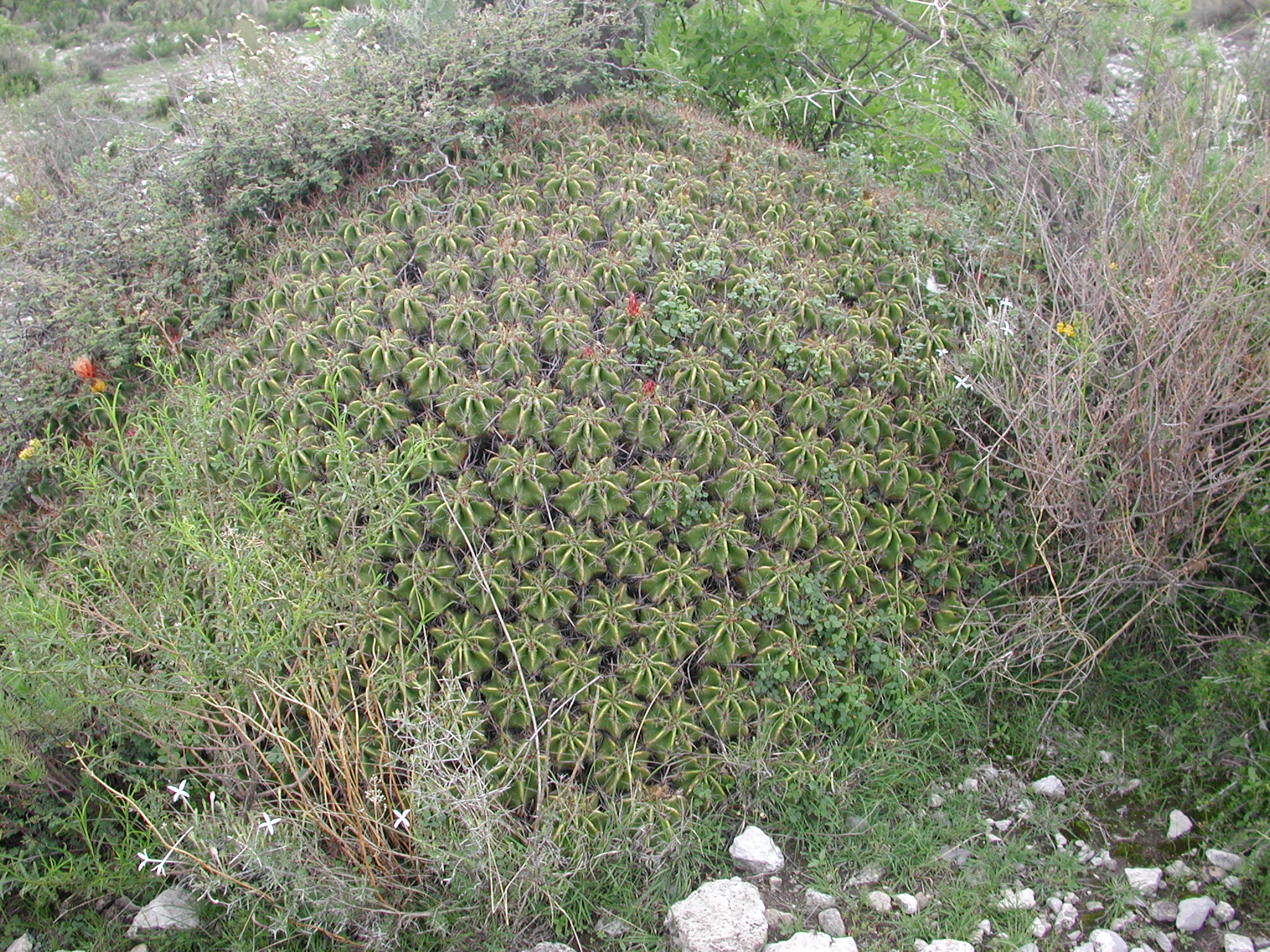
Plant growing in Tehuacán Valley matorral

== Taxonomy ==
Initially described as Echinocactus robustus in 1837 by Ludwig Georg Karl Pfeiffer, it was later classified under the genus Ferocactus by Nathaniel Lord Britton and Joseph Nelson Rose in 1922. The species epithet 'robustus' is Latin for 'strong,' 'rough,' or 'firm,' referring to its robust appearance.
