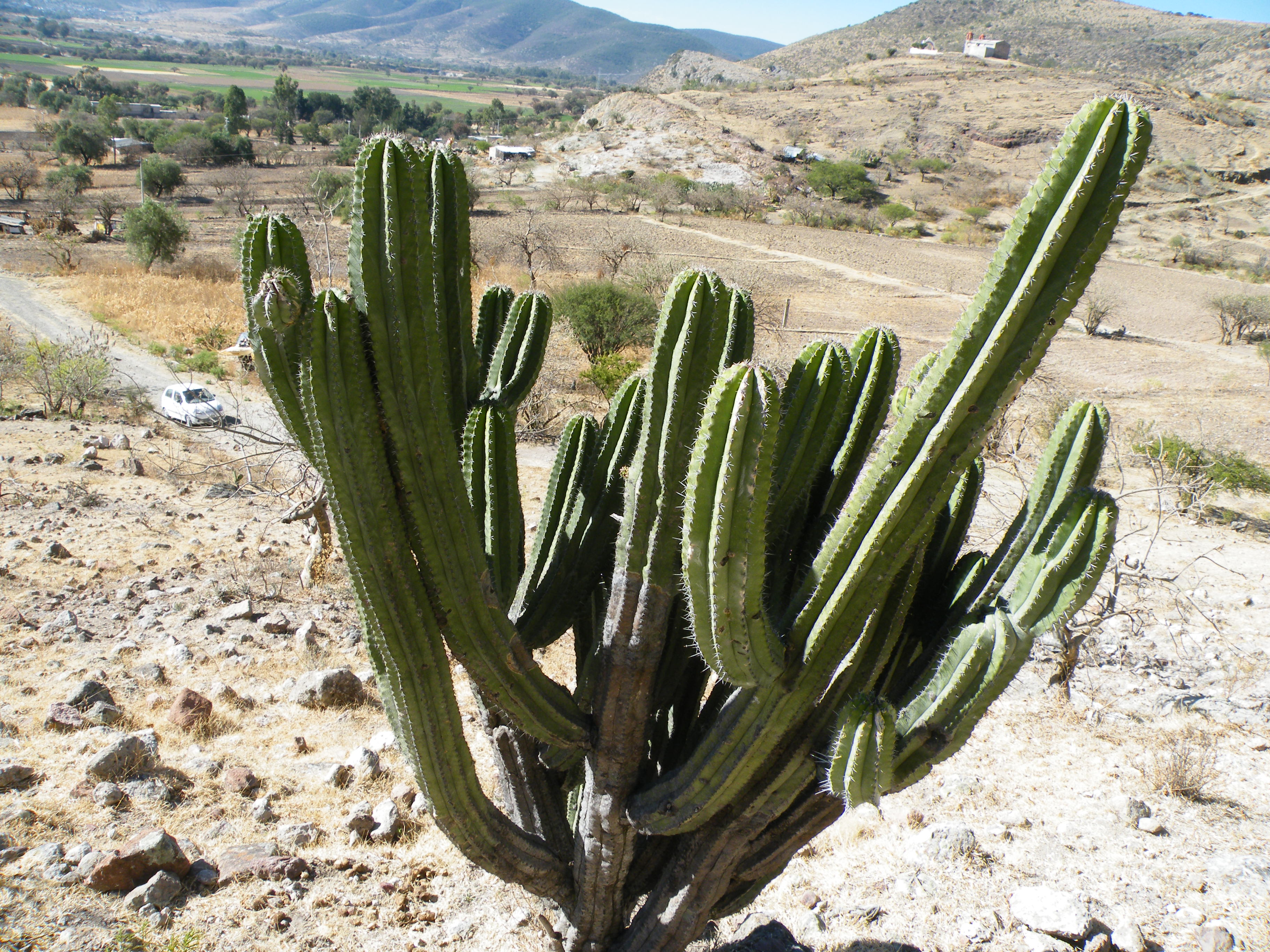

Conservation status
- Least Concern (IUCN 3.1)

Scientific classification
- Kingdom: Plantae
- Clade: Tracheophytes
- Clade: Angiosperms
- Clade: Eudicots
- Order: Caryophyllales
- Family: Cactaceae
- Subfamily: Cactoideae
- Genus: Polaskia
- Species: P. chende

Binomial name
- Polaskia chende (Rol-.Goss.) A.C.Gibson & K.E.Horak
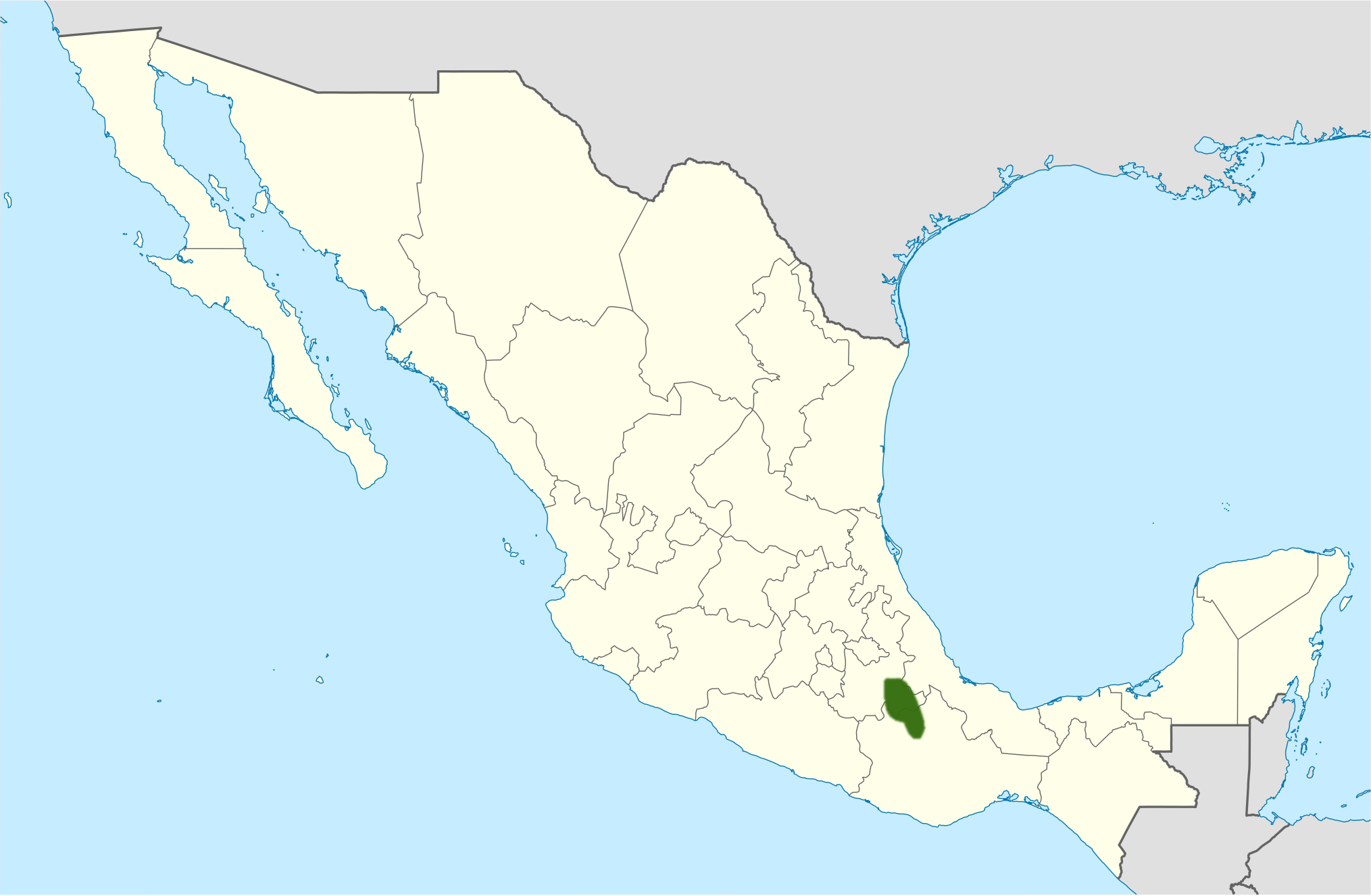
- Distribution of Polaskia chende

Synonyms
- Cereus chende Rol.-Goss.; Cereus delmoralii J.A.Purpus; Heliabravoa chende (Rol.-Goss.) Bravo & D.K.Cox; Lemaireocereus chende Rol.-Goss.) Britton & Rose; Myrtillocactus chende (Rol.-Goss.) P.V.Heath

= Polaskia chende =

Species of cactus

Polaskia chende is a succulent cactus native to a small area of mountains of northern Oaxaca and southern Puebla, Mexico. It grows in xerophytic shrubland between 1,500 and 2,000 m (4,900 and 6,600 ft) above mean sea level.

== Description ==
Polaskia chende forms 3 to 5 m tall (9 ft 10 in – 16 ft 5 in), branching columnar stems, 40 to 80 cm long and 5 to 7 cm wide, and can reach up to 4.5 m in height. It has 7 or 8 ribs, rarely 9, 1.7 to 3 cm high, with areoles 5 mm long, circular to elliptical, spaced 2 cm apart, with the presence of black trichomes. It has 5 or 6 radial spines 2 cm long and 0.8 cm wide, grey, and the central spine may be absent or rudimentary; the fertile zone is not differentiated from the infertile zone. Its flowers are white, reach a length of 5 cm, oblanceolate, with a mucronate apex, green, some with a red to purple middle stripe. The fruit are about 3 cm long and 4 cm wide, purple in color, with short bracts, yellow trichomes, short spines, and juicy purple pulp. Seeds are 1.6 mm long and 1 mm wide. Flowering occurs between August and January, and the plant bears fruit between December and June.

== Distribution ==
It inhabits oak (Quercus) forests, xeric scrublands, tropical deciduous forests, and among riparian vegetation, at elevations from 1,700 to 2,200 m (5,600 to 7,200 ft).

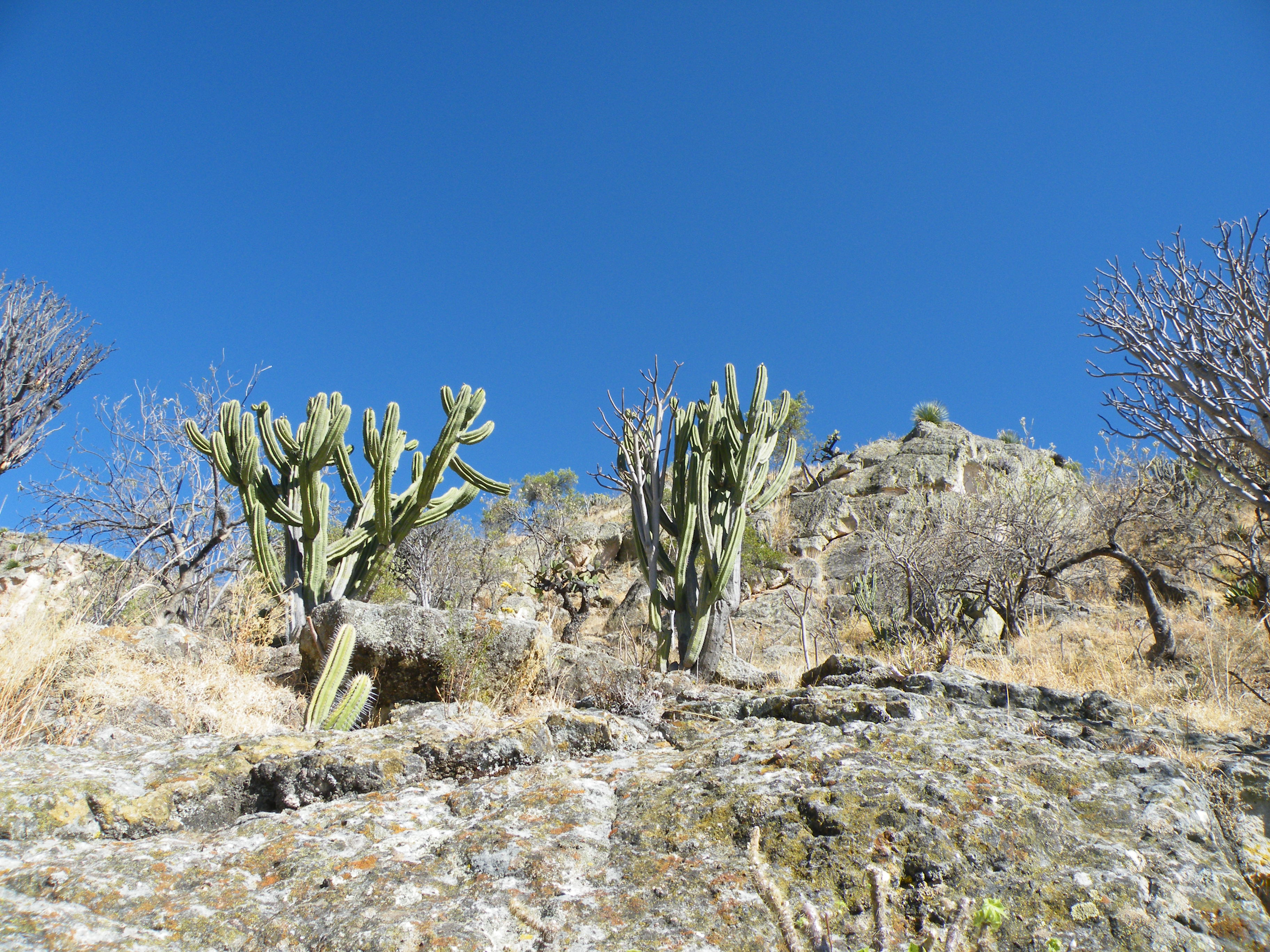
Limestone habitat in Oaxaca

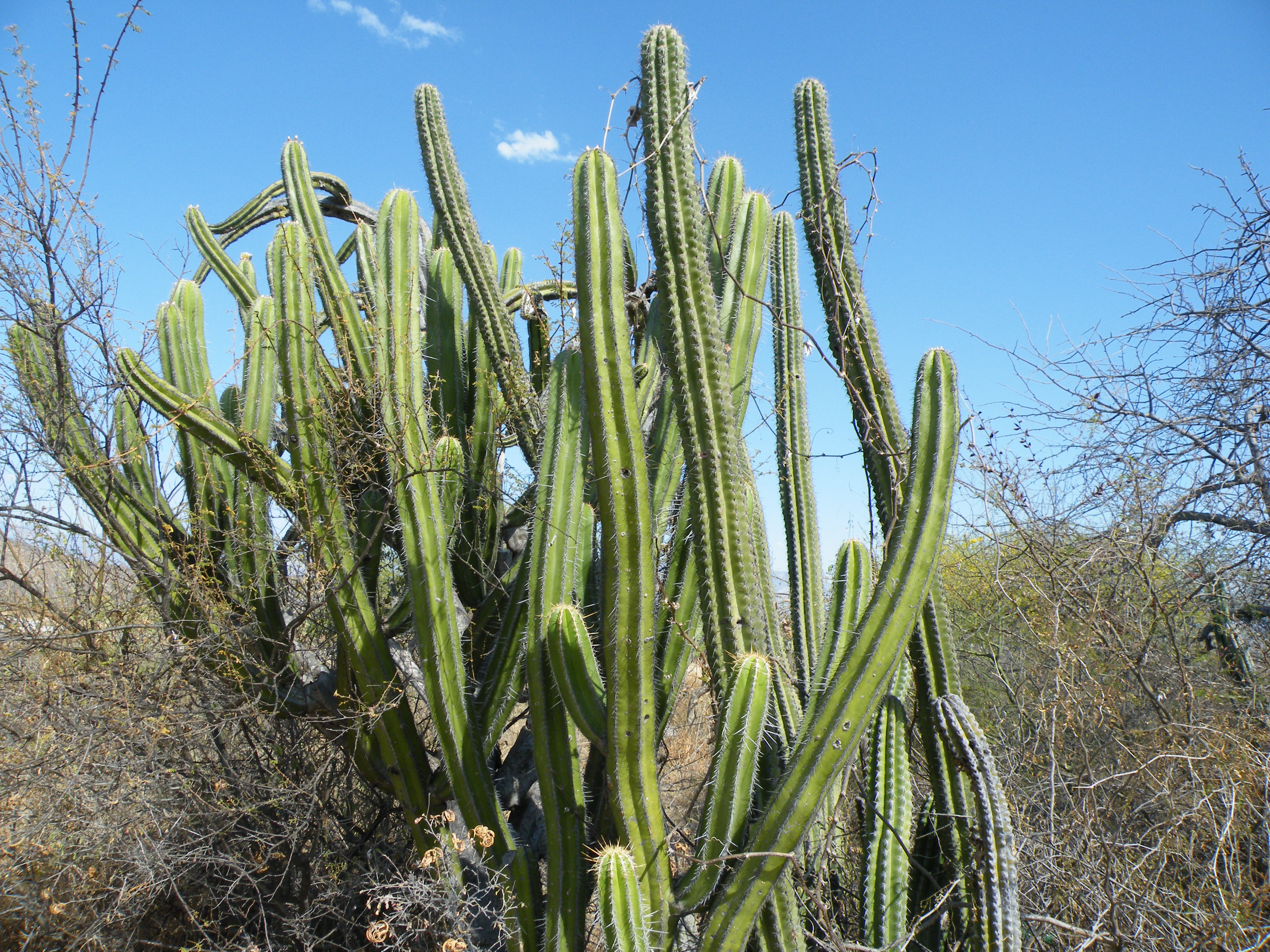
Adult plant in Oaxaca

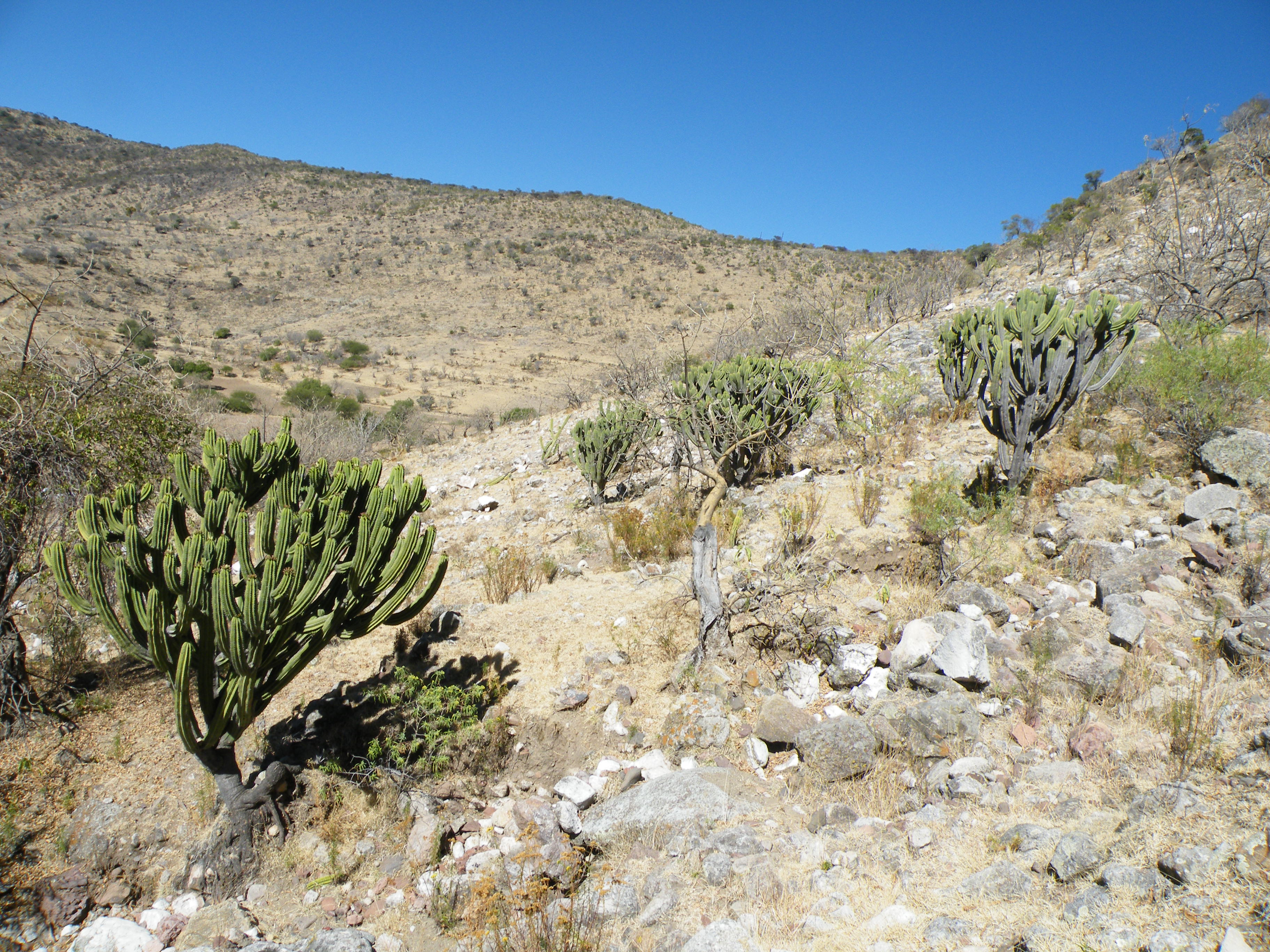
scrublands habitat in Oaxaca

== Taxonomy ==
The plant, initially named Cereus chende, was described by Robert Roland-Gosselin in 1905. The specific epithet chende comes from its Spanish common name. In 1979, Arthur Charles Gibson and Karl E. Horak reclassified the species under the genus Polaskia.
