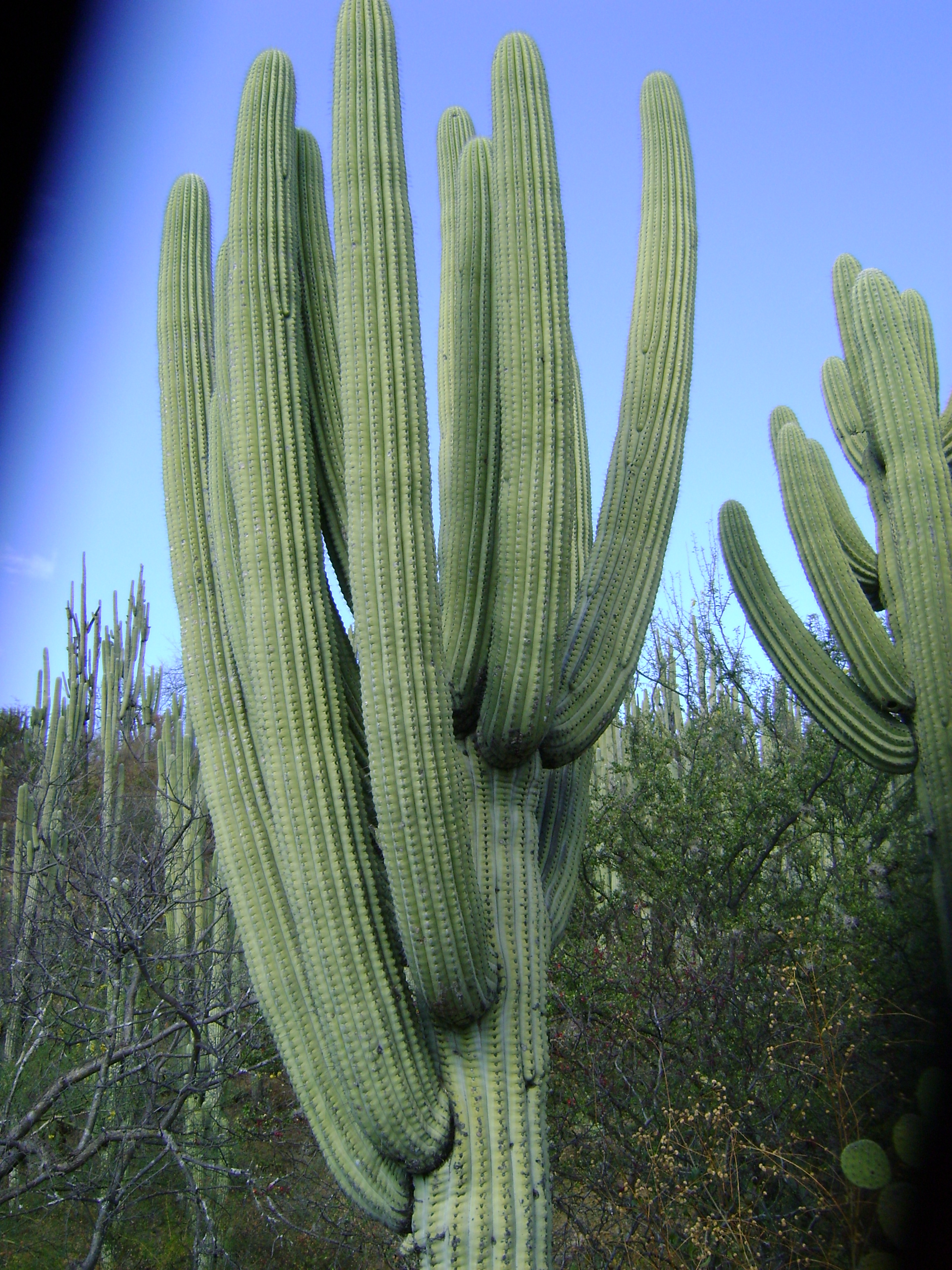

Conservation status
- Least Concern (IUCN 3.1)

Scientific classification
- Kingdom: Plantae
- Clade: Tracheophytes
- Clade: Angiosperms
- Clade: Eudicots
- Order: Caryophyllales
- Family: Cactaceae
- Subfamily: Cactoideae
- Genus: Cephalocereus
- Species: C. tetetzo

Binomial name
- Cephalocereus tetetzo (F.A.C.Weber ex J.M.Coult.) Diguet

Synonyms
- Carnegiea tetetzo (F.A.C.Weber ex J.M.Coult.) P.V.Heath 1992; Cereus tetetzo F.A.C.Weber ex J.M.Coult. 1896; Neobuxbaumia tetetzo (F.A.C.Weber ex J.M.Coult.) Backeb. 1938; Pachycereus tetetzo (F.A.C.Weber ex J.M.Coult.) Ochot. 1922; Pilocereus tetetzo (F.A.C.Weber ex J.M.Coult.) F.A.C.Weber ex K.Schum. 1897; Pilocereus tetetzo var. cristata F.A.C.Weber 1897

= Cephalocereus tetetzo =

Species of cactus

Cephalocereus tetetzo is a species of cactus from Mexico.

== Description ==
Cephalocereus tetetzo grows in a columnar with mostly branching shoots and reaches heights of up to 15 meters. A trunk with a diameter of up to 70 cm (28 in) is formed. The gray-green shoots are 8 to 12 meters long and have a diameter of 18 to 30 cm (7.1 to 11.8 in). The 15 to 20 blunt ribs are slightly rounded with black spines. The areoles have a single central spine, up to 5 cm (2.0 in) long and 8 to 13 radial spines are 1 to 2 cm (0.39 to 0.79 in) long.

The bell- to funnel-shaped whitish flowers 5 to 6 cm (2.0 to 2.4 in) long appear near the tips of the shoots. Its pericarpel and flower tube are covered with tubercles, scales, wool and bristles. The egg-shaped green fruits are up to 4 cm (1.6 in) long and have thorns.

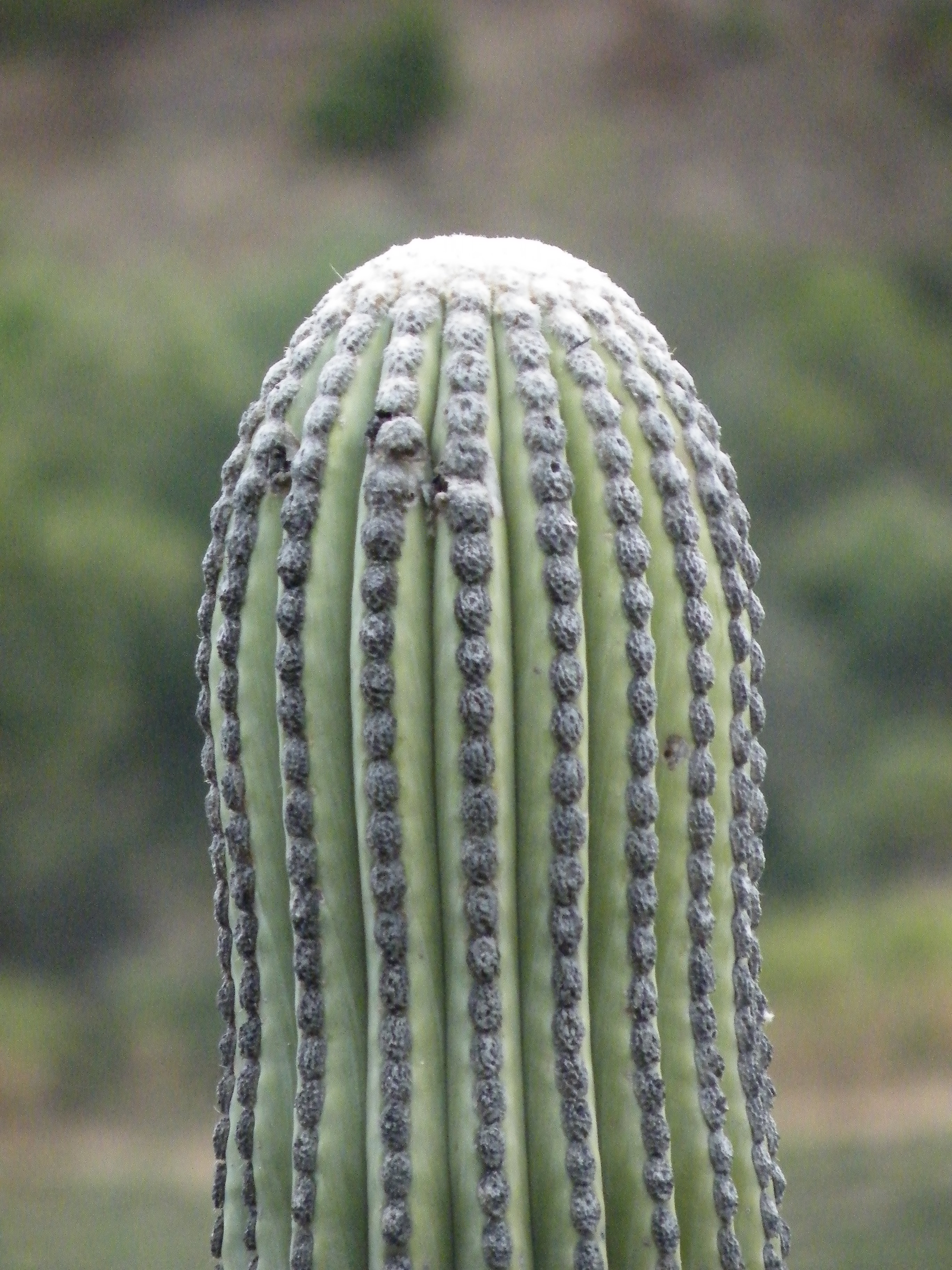
tip of plant

== Distribution ==
Cephalocereus tetetzo is distributed in the Mexican states of Puebla and Oaxaca.

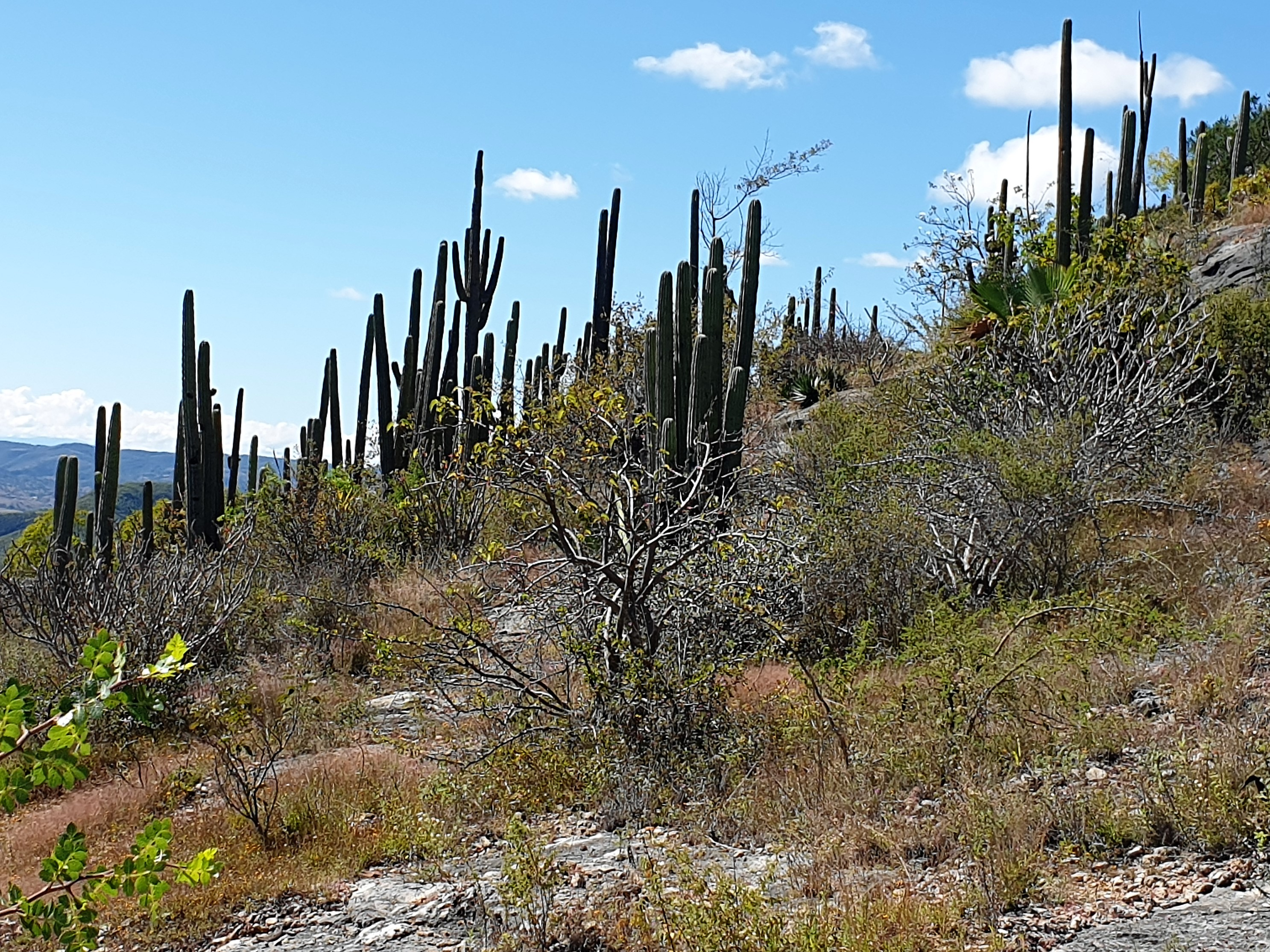
Plants in habitat at the Hierve el Agua, Oaxaca, Mexico.

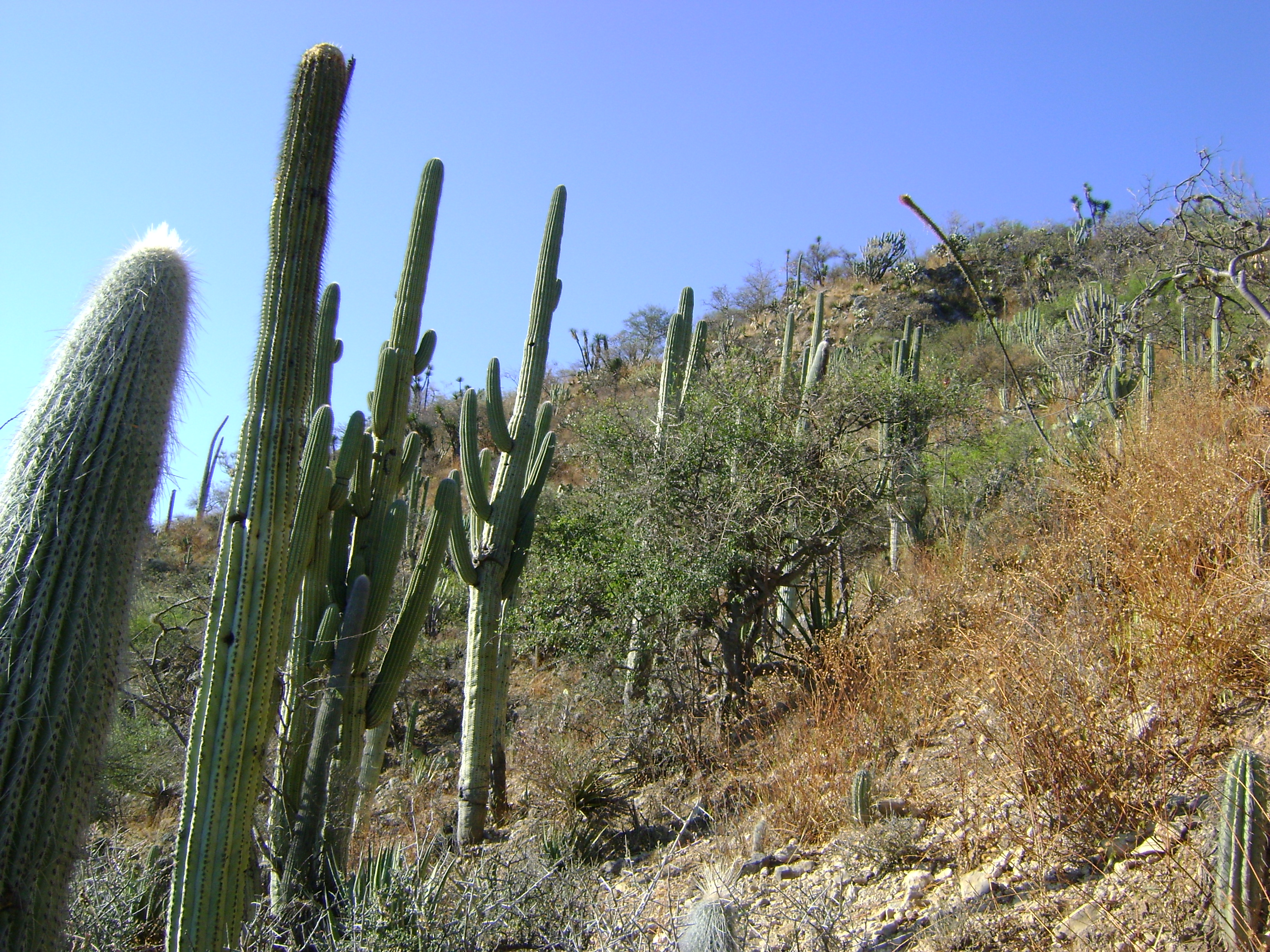
Plants in habitat at Zapotitlan De Las Salinas, Puebla

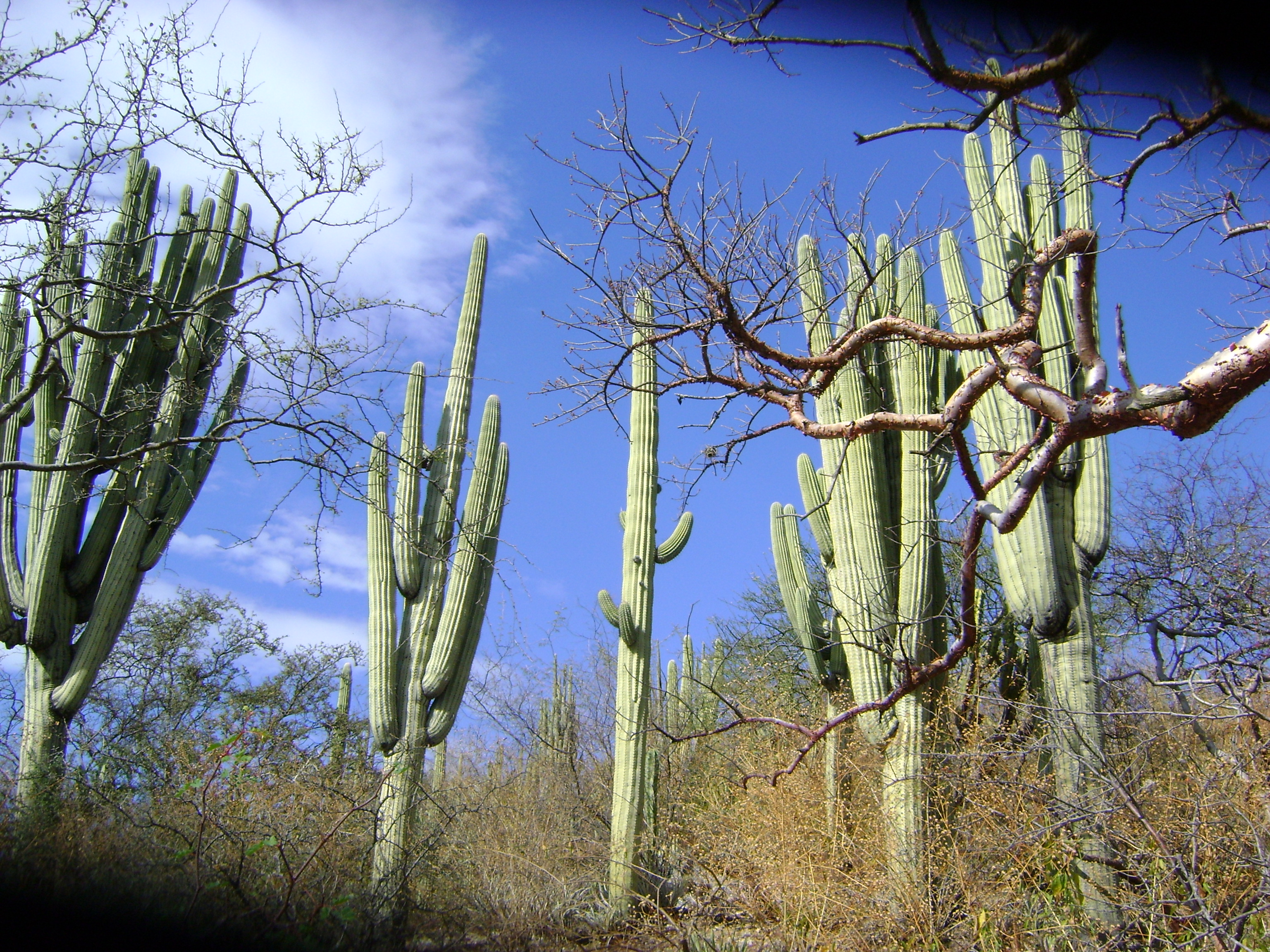
Plants in habitat near San Juan De Los Cues, Oaxaca

== Taxonomy ==
The first description as Cereus tetetzo (spelled "Cereus tetazo") was made in 1896 by John Merle Coulter. The specific epithet tetetzo refers to the Spanish common name "Tetetzo". Léon Diguet placed the species in the genus Cephalocereus in 1928. Further nomenclature synonyms are Pilocereus tetetzo (F.A.C.Weber ex J.M.Coult.) F.A.C.Weber ex K.Schum. (1897), Cephalocereus tetetzo (F.A.C.Weber ex K.Schum.) Vaupel (1909), Pachycereus tetetzo (F.A.C.Weber ex K.Schum.) Ochot. (1922), Neobuxbaumia tetetzo (F.A.C.Weber ex J.M.Coult.) Backeb. (1938) and Carnegiea tetetzo (F.A.C.Weber ex J.M.Coult.) P.V.Heath (1992).
