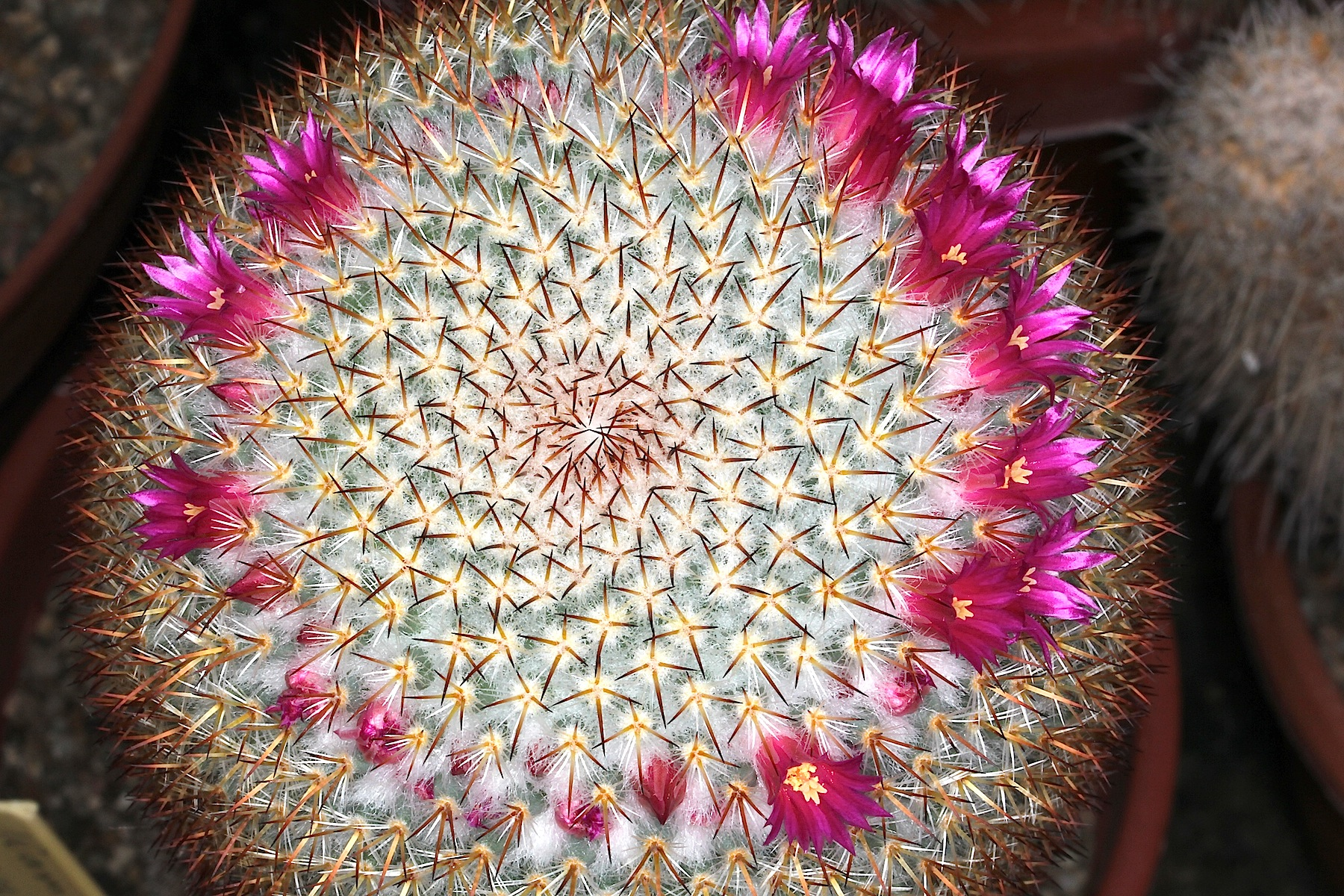

Conservation status
- Least Concern (IUCN 3.1)

Scientific classification
- Kingdom: Plantae
- Clade: Tracheophytes
- Clade: Angiosperms
- Clade: Eudicots
- Order: Caryophyllales
- Family: Cactaceae
- Subfamily: Cactoideae
- Genus: Mammillaria
- Species: M. haageana

Binomial name
- Mammillaria haageana Pfeiff.

Synonyms
- Mammillaria vaupelii Tiegel; Mammillaria sanangelensis Sánchez-Mej. Mammillaria meissneri C. Ehrenb. Mammillaria haageana subsp. schmollii (R.T. Craig) D.R. Hunt; Mammillaria haageana var. schmollii (R.T. Craig) D.R. Hunt; Mammillaria haageana subsp. san-angelensis (Sánchez-Mej.) D.R. Hunt; Mammillaria haageana subsp. haageana Pfeiff. Mammillaria haageana subsp. elegans D.R. Hunt; Mammillaria haageana subsp. conspicua (J.A. Purpus) D.R. Hunt; Mammillaria haageana subsp. acultzingensis (Linzen et al.) D.R. Hunt; Mammillaria donatii Berge ex K. Schum. Mammillaria conspicua J.A. Purpus; Mammillaria collina J.A. Purpus; Mammillaria albidula Backeb.

= Mammillaria haageana =

Species of cactus

Mammillaria haageana is a species of cacti in the tribe Cacteae. It is native to Mexico, where it is found commonly, and is widespread throughout much of the country.

== Gallery ==
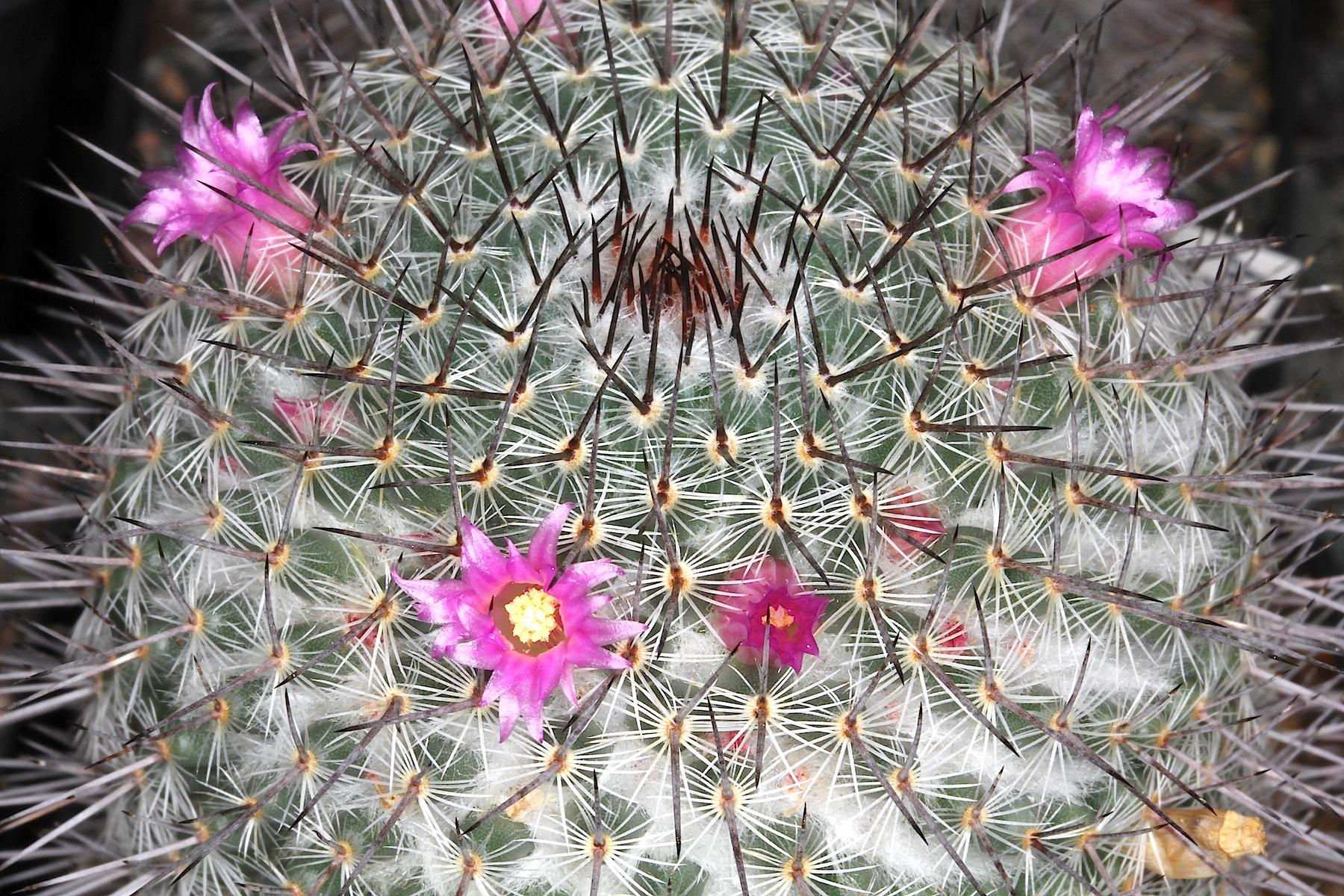

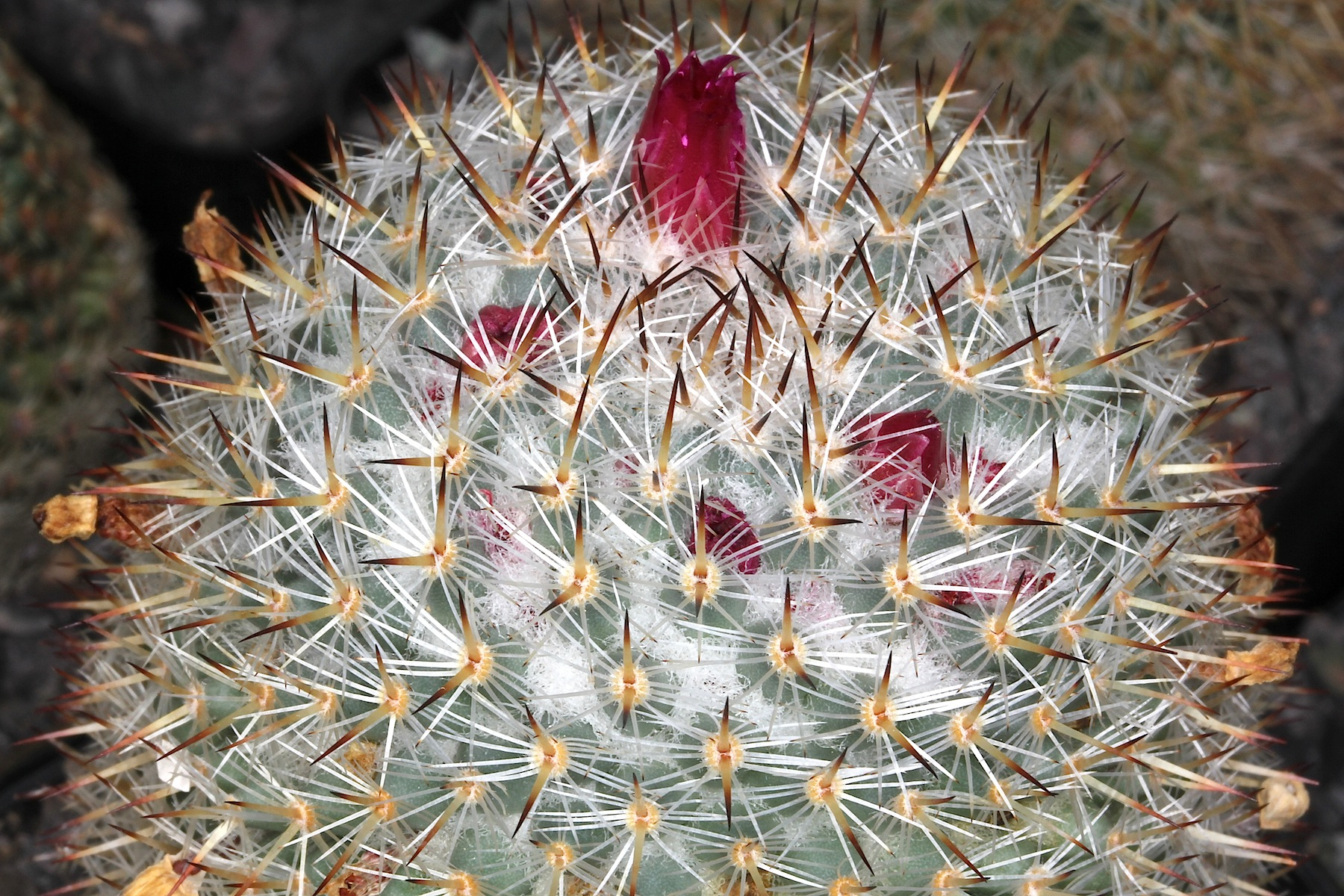

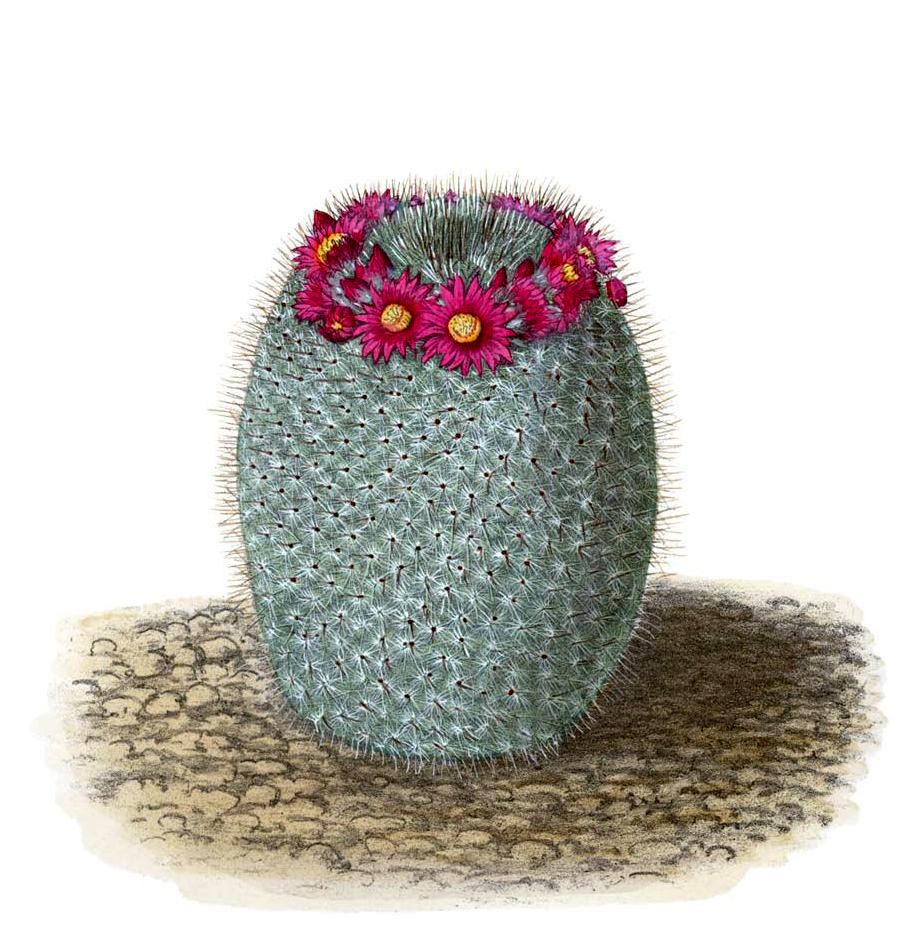

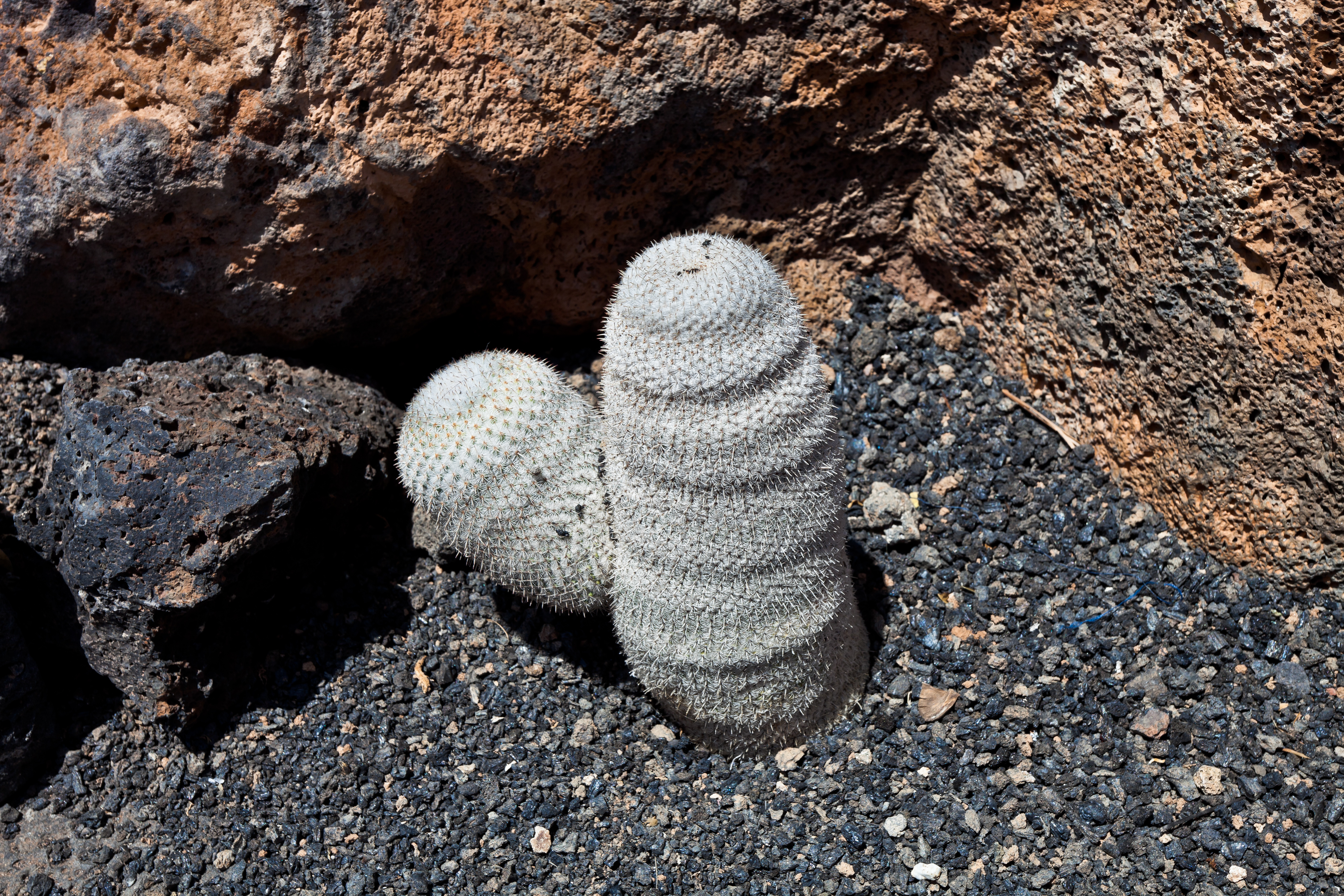
