= Arachnid (disambiguation) =

An arachnid is a member of a class of joint-legged invertebrate animals.

Arachnid may also refer to:

- Arachnid Solitaire or Spider, a solitaire card game
- Arachnid or Bugs (Starship Troopers), a member of a fictional alien race in Starship Troopers by Robert A. Heinlein
- Arachnid (film), a 2001 American horror film

== See also ==
- Arachne (disambiguation)
- Arachnoid (disambiguation)
