= Felted =

Biological term

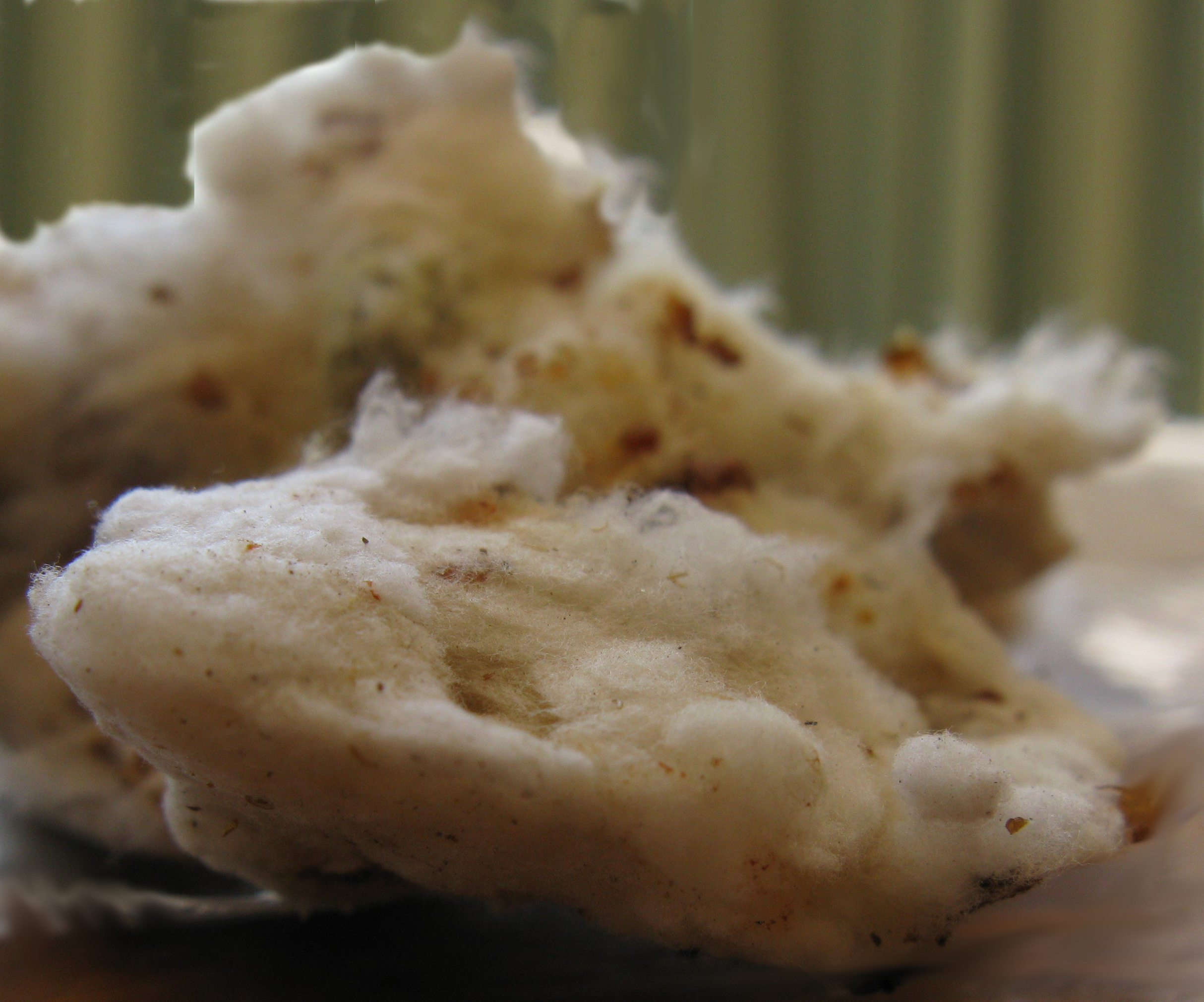
Felted plant fibre from nest of a carder bee

A felted material is a hairy or filamentous (hairy-like) fibre that is densely packed or tangled, forming felt or felt-like structures.

== Advantages of felted tissue ==
The dermis is described in Gray's Anatomy as "felted connective tissue, with a varying amount of elastic fibers and numerous blood vessels, lymphatics, and nerves." When describing the external coat of an artery (the tunica adventitia), Gray said that it "...consists mainly of fine and closely felted bundles of white connective tissue..." In such classes of connective tissue the felted structure helps with resistance to tearing by distributing localised stresses, and it imparts shock absorption and elasticity in two or three dimensions at once regardless of the shape of the tissue. In other words, certain types of felting can yield controllable isotropy or anisotropy in the behaviour of a structure.

== Zoology ==
=== Mammals ===
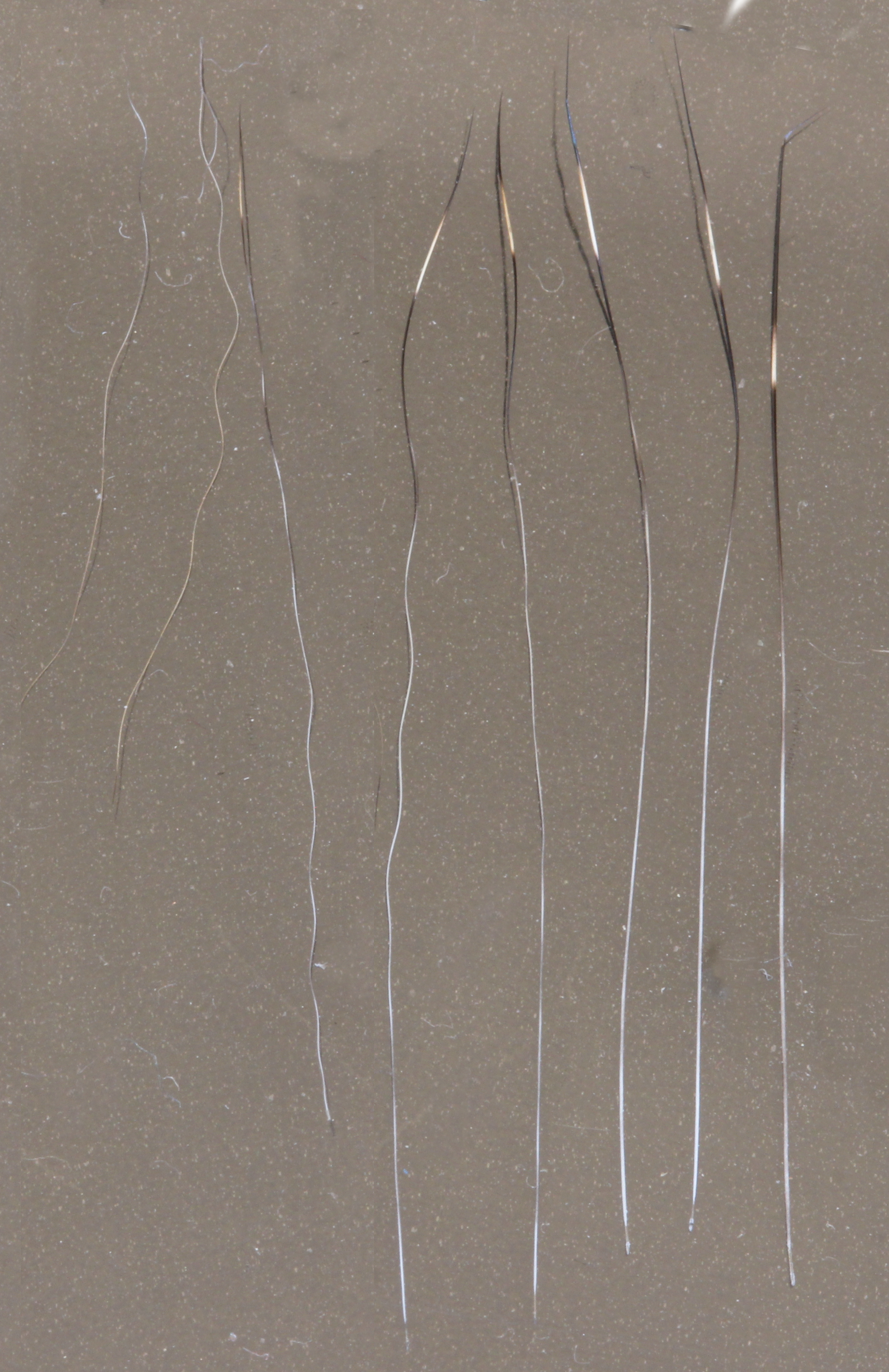
Down (woolly) hair, awn hair and guard hair of domestic cat (left to right).

Although truly felted hair on healthy mammals is unusual, many animals, especially in seasonally cold or wet climates or environments, have a so-called undercoat of down hair plus awn hair that usually lies hidden beneath the outer coat of guard hairs and may form a mat of lightly felted wool. Such down hairs as a rule are crimped into a finely woolly texture and contain waxy, water-repellent lanolin. In a mass they serve to retain insulating air and exclude water. In many species that live in seasonally frigid zones the winter down hair is shed in clumps during springtime. Herders can collect the wool for commercial purposes without the need for shearing.

The ground-dwelling mice species of the genus Mus in parts of Africa build spherical nests of assorted fibres in burrows or under large flat objects. Rabbits, in particular Sylvilagus species, use their own fur as a major component of their nesting material. The least weasel (Mustela nivalis), a predatory mammal, collects fur from its prey or occupies prey nests already lined; the fur forms a felted nest lining.

=== Birds ===
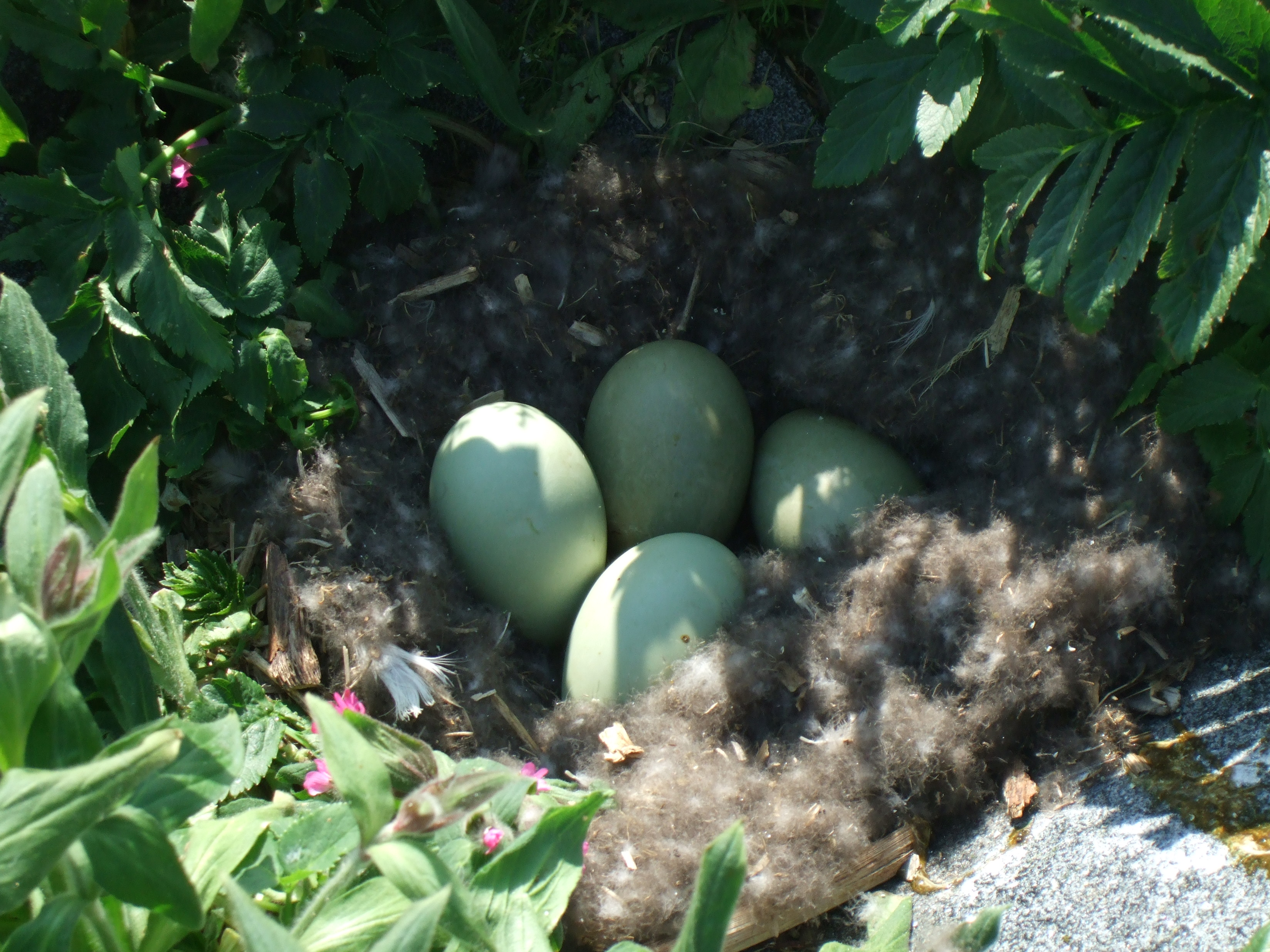
Common eider (Somateria mollissima) nest, with the eggs deep in the loosely piled down

Weaver birds of the family Ploceidae weave nests that are lined with downy materials that become felted, both with each other and with the surrounding nest material. Sparrows build twiggy nests and line them with downy material. Other birds do little weaving in building their nests but instead construct their nests mainly of fibrous and downy materials such as fine wool, moss, lichen, spiders' nests, tufts of cotton, arachnoid fluff, or bark scales, that are supported by twigs or the walls of burrows. Naturalist James Rennie remarked, "A circumstance also never neglected, is to bind the nest firmly into the forks of the bush where it is placed, by twining bands of moss, felted with wool, round all the contiguous branches, both below and at the sides." During the nesting season such birds commonly become such avid seekers of suitable materials that down feathers or tufts of wool may be used as bait for trapping them. Goldfinches (Carduelis species) make felted nests. Hummingbirds do the same with spider webs and moss. Small warbler-like birds of the genera Prinia and Cisticola make their nests either heavily lined with, or entirely of, felted material. Ground nesting birds often use felted material rather than woven. For example, the common eider (Somateria mollissima), famous for the valuable down harvested from its abandoned nests, lays its eggs in very lightly felted bowls of its own down for insulation.

=== Invertebrates ===
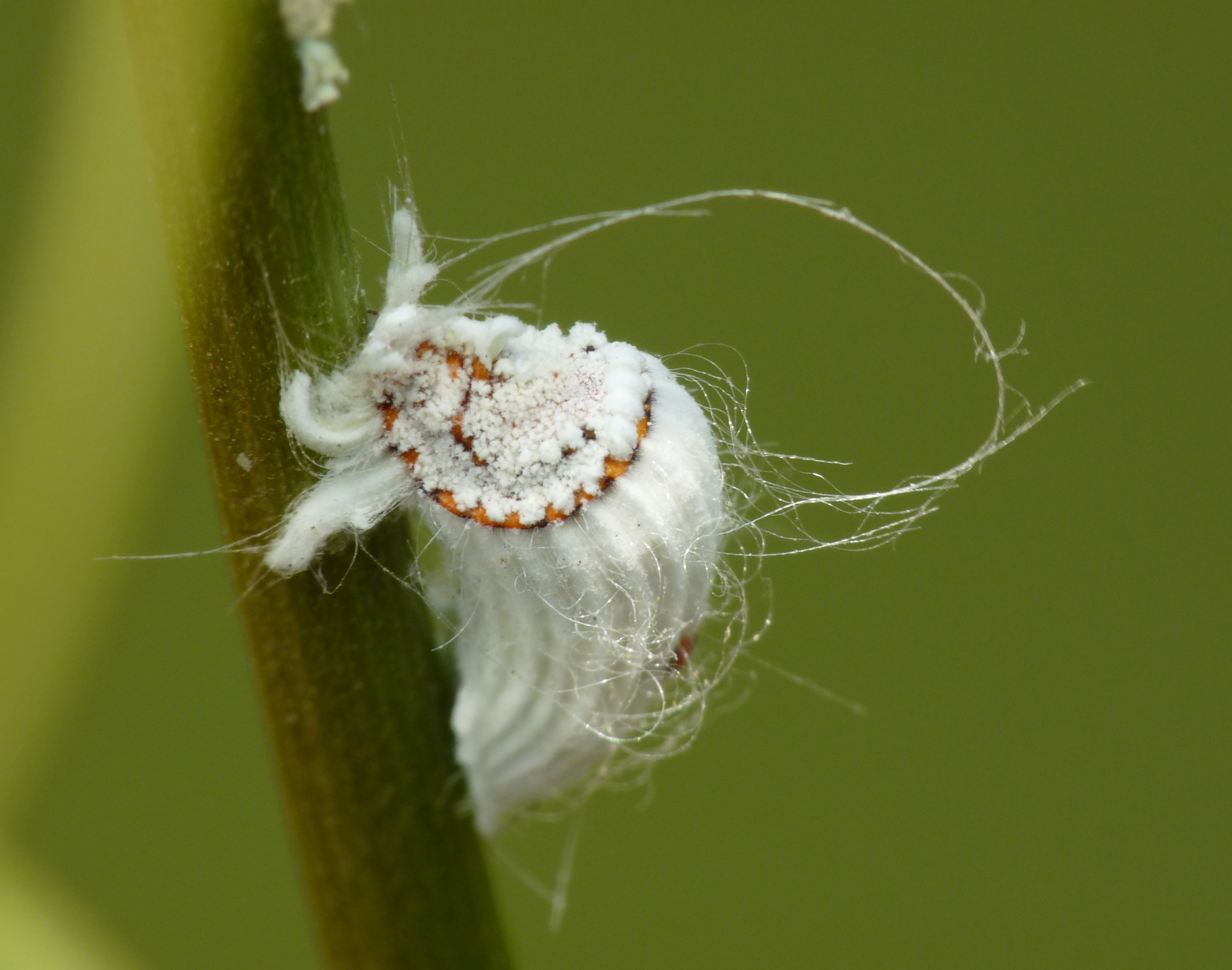
A cottony cushion scale (Icerya purchasi) female rests on her fibrous waxy protection for the eggs.

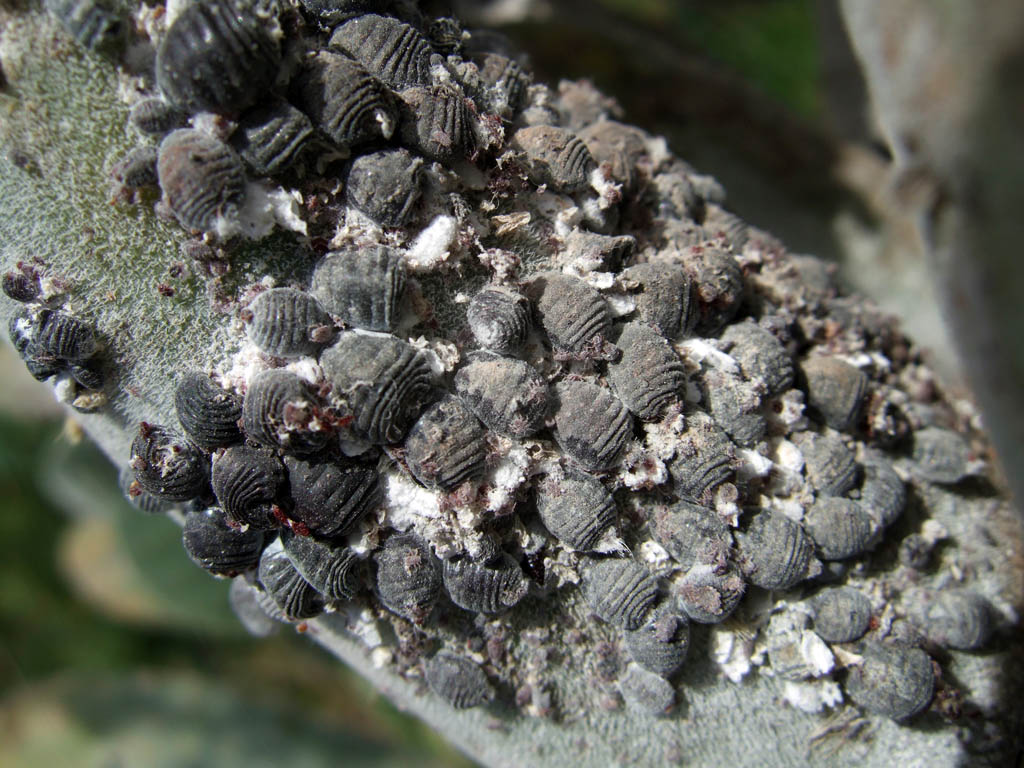
In cochineal females, the white waxy fibre does not cover the insect, but rather the eggs.

The integument of some insects can be coated with a felted material. It is not usually living tissue but consists of waxy fibres that serve as protection from either excessive desiccation or moisture. It is common in some families of the Hemiptera (true bugs). In some species it occurs only as an outer coat of the immature insect, but in others, such as many of the Coccoidea, including the cottony cushion scale Icerya purchasi and the cochineal of genus Dactylopius, it is secreted throughout the life of the insect and serves largely to protect the eggs rather than the insect itself. In other species, such as many of the woolly aphids of subfamily Eriosomatinae, the most fluff is borne on the adult insect.

Burying beetles of genus Nicrophorus are known for stripping the fur or feathers from the carcasses that they prepare for their young, then using the material to line and reinforce the crypt that they dig. It is unclear if this habit is incidental or how important it is to the species. French naturalist and entomologist Jean-Henri Fabre demonstrated that the species he investigated did not depend on feathered or hairy food items and were capable of using reptiles, amphibians and fish.

Carder bees of family Megachilidae build their nests using fibre collected from arachnoid plants, and possibly fibre from other sources such as animal wool.

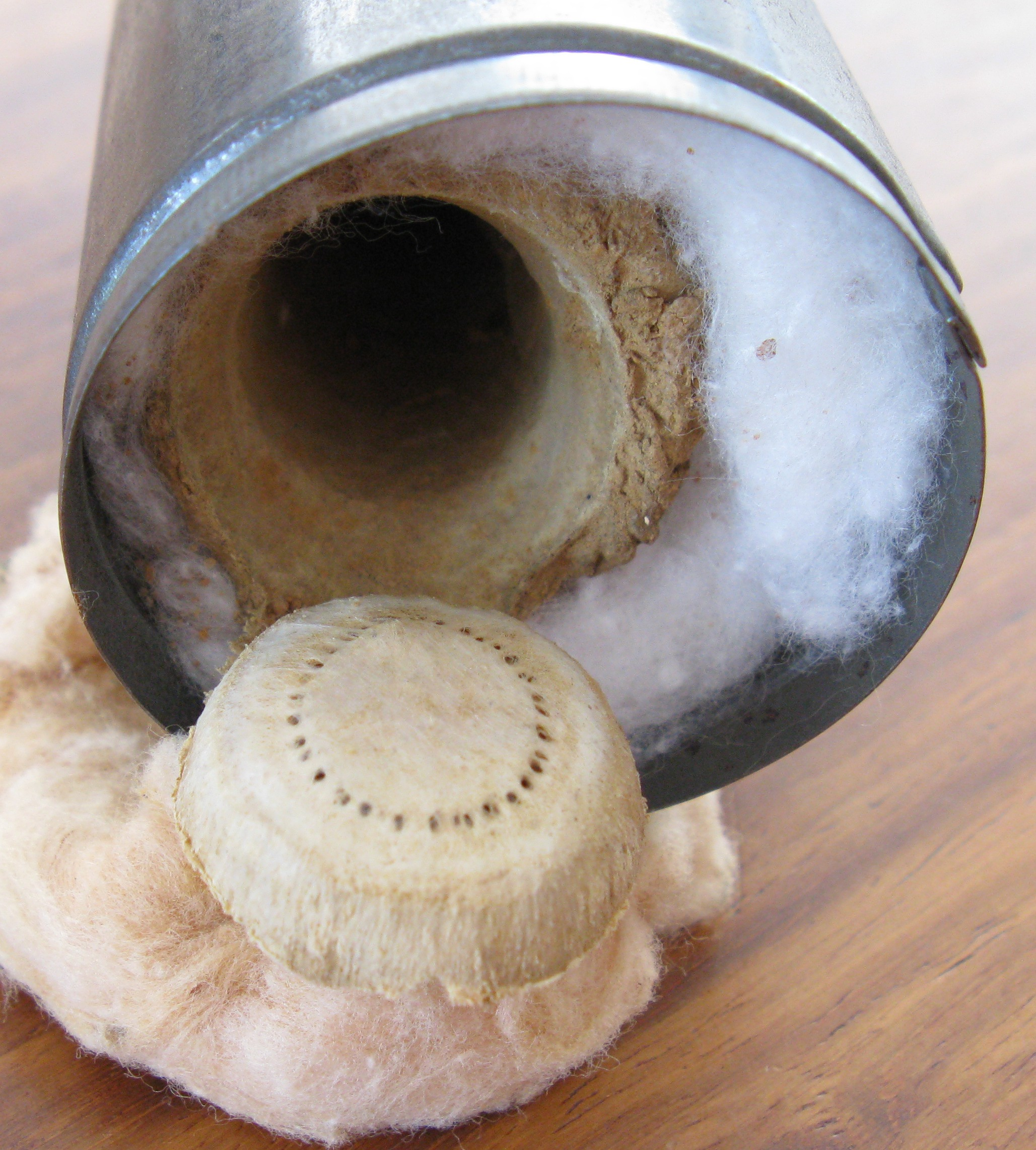
Spider trapdoor of silk and clay

Spider egg cases are partly or largely felted silk. The lids of various species of trapdoor spider burrows vary in their construction, but they are largely of earth and similar material reinforced with partly felted silk.

== Botany ==
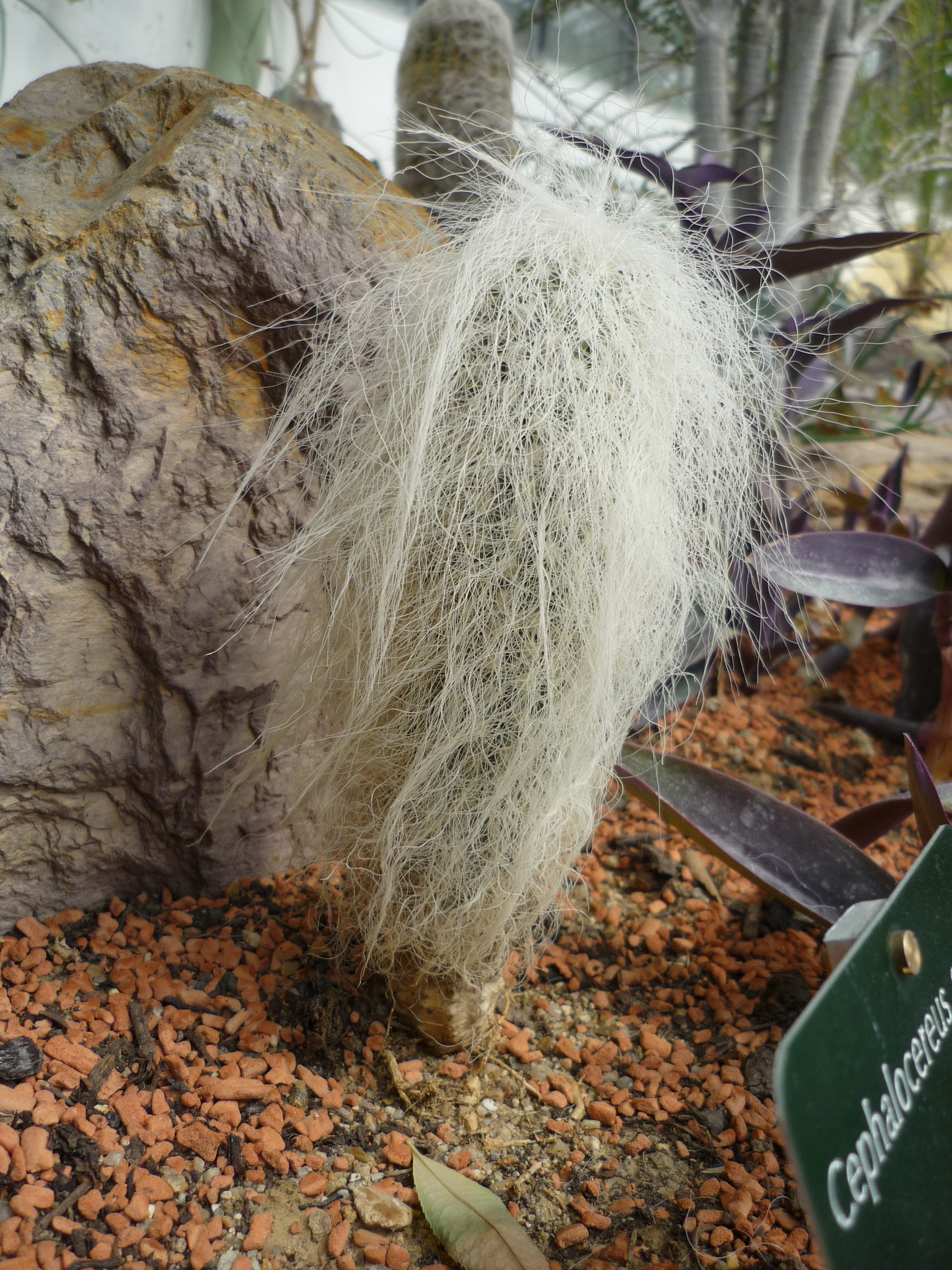
Cephalocereus senilis (old man cactus) showing felted radial spines

In botany, felted is defined as "matted with intertwined hairs". A felted covering is protective against grazing or browsing, wind, windblown sand, ultraviolet radiation, drought, and desiccation. An example is Cephalocereus senilis (old man cactus), which has radial spines that grow into a tangled coating of white hair, concealing the green tissue and the spines. The felt forms a protection against intense radiation, wind, frost, and herbivores. The woolly masses of fibres on such cacti have been used as stuffing for pillows.

== Mycology ==
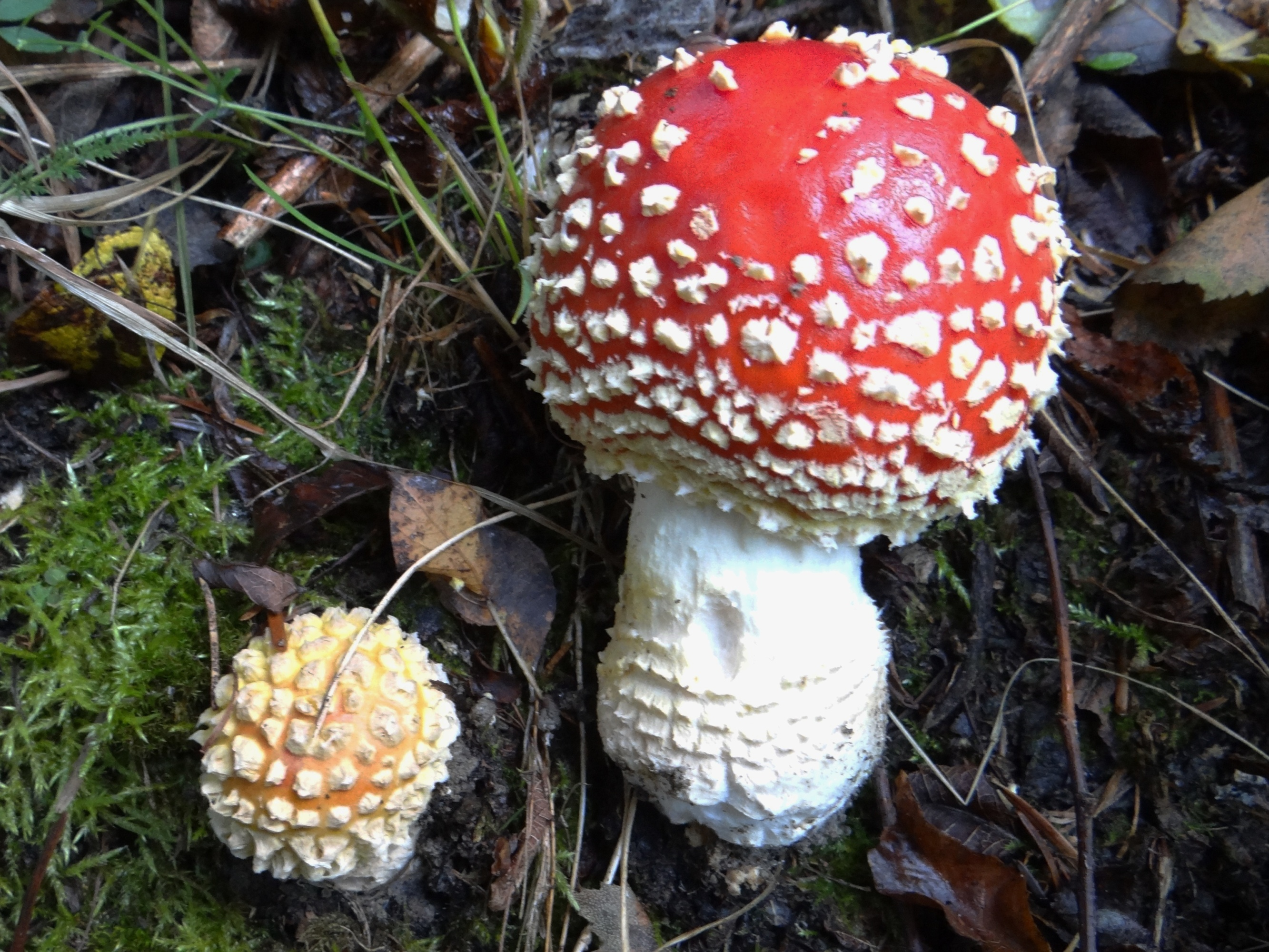
Amanita muscaria growing through the volva, the remnant felted tissue forming spots on the surface

Most fungal tissue is filamentous, predisposing it to grow into tangles that lend themselves to felting. Whereas vascular plants seldom have cells that grow into forms that can form massive tangles, fungi hardly can form tissues at all except by tangling and felting their hyphal filaments. Most mushroom tissue, including cords and membranes, is formed of anastomosed and felted hyphae. The spots on the caps of Amanita muscaria consist of felted patches of remnant tissue from the volva.
