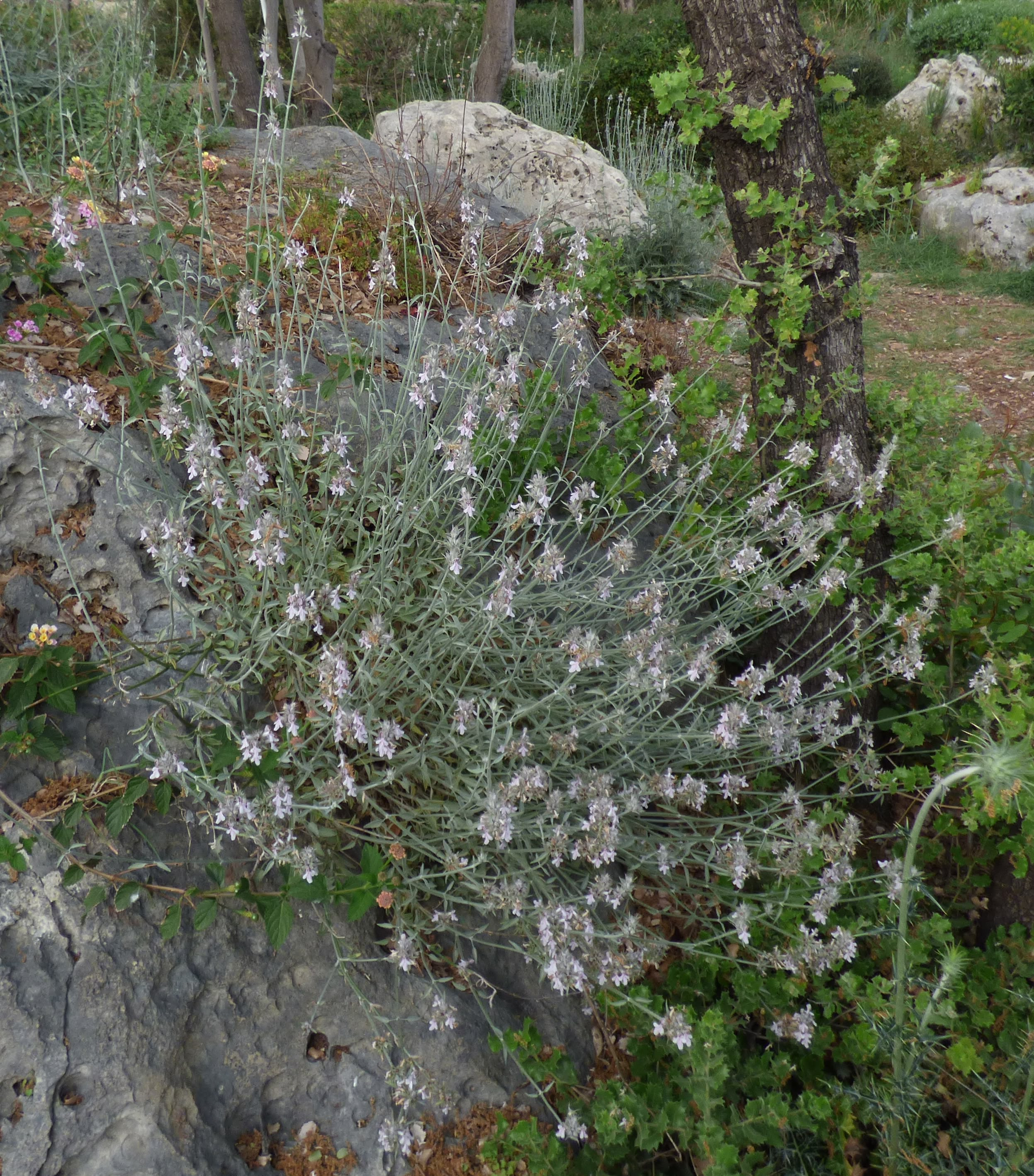

Scientific classification
- Kingdom: Plantae
- Clade: Tracheophytes
- Clade: Angiosperms
- Clade: Eudicots
- Clade: Asterids
- Order: Lamiales
- Family: Lamiaceae
- Genus: Stachys
- Species: S. aleurites

Binomial name
- Stachys aleurites Boiss. & Heldr.

= Stachys aleurites =

Species of flowering plant

Stachys aleurites is a species of flowering plant in the family Lamiaceae endemic to the Antalya region of Turkey. It was first published in 1848.

== Description ==
Stachys aleurites is a woody-based, perennial herb with many moderately long, simple stems (to 60 cm), growing on calcareous rocks near the Antalya coast at an altitude of 10–1275 m (there is a further record in 1950 from Mersin).

The stems and leaves at first are whitened with a thin layer of felty (arachnoid) hair on the surface, becoming mostly green with age as the hair is lost. The leaves are moderately sized (to 1.5 x 2.5 cm), oval, and crenate-serrate toothed. Its flowers are in whorls of 6-12(-20), on the upper parts of the stems; there are a number (2–6) of such whorls, and they are well-spaced except the top few which are usually close together. The flowers are white with purple streaks and spots, at times giving a general light pink appearance. Each individual flower is very short-stalked, with a calyx whose 5 lobes are notably spiny-ended, which at maturity curve strongly outward.

As a regional-endemic growing in and close beside an expanding tourist city, the conservation status of this species is regarded as NT (Near Threatened) (IUCN 2017).

Photographic details can be seen on iNaturalist.

Similar plants it might be confused with are Stachys bombycina (having few, well-spaced whorls (1-2(4)) of pinkish flowers, a feltier whiteness to stems and leaves that is retained in old age, and much less conspicuously spinescent calyx lobes which don't curve out at maturity); Stachys distans (having few (1-4(5)), well-spaced whorls of white flowers, stems that remain felty white in old age, but with calyx lobes that are spiny-ended and curve out in maturity); and S. pseudobombycina, which was synonymised with S. bombycina by Akçiçek (2012)).

== Photographic description ==
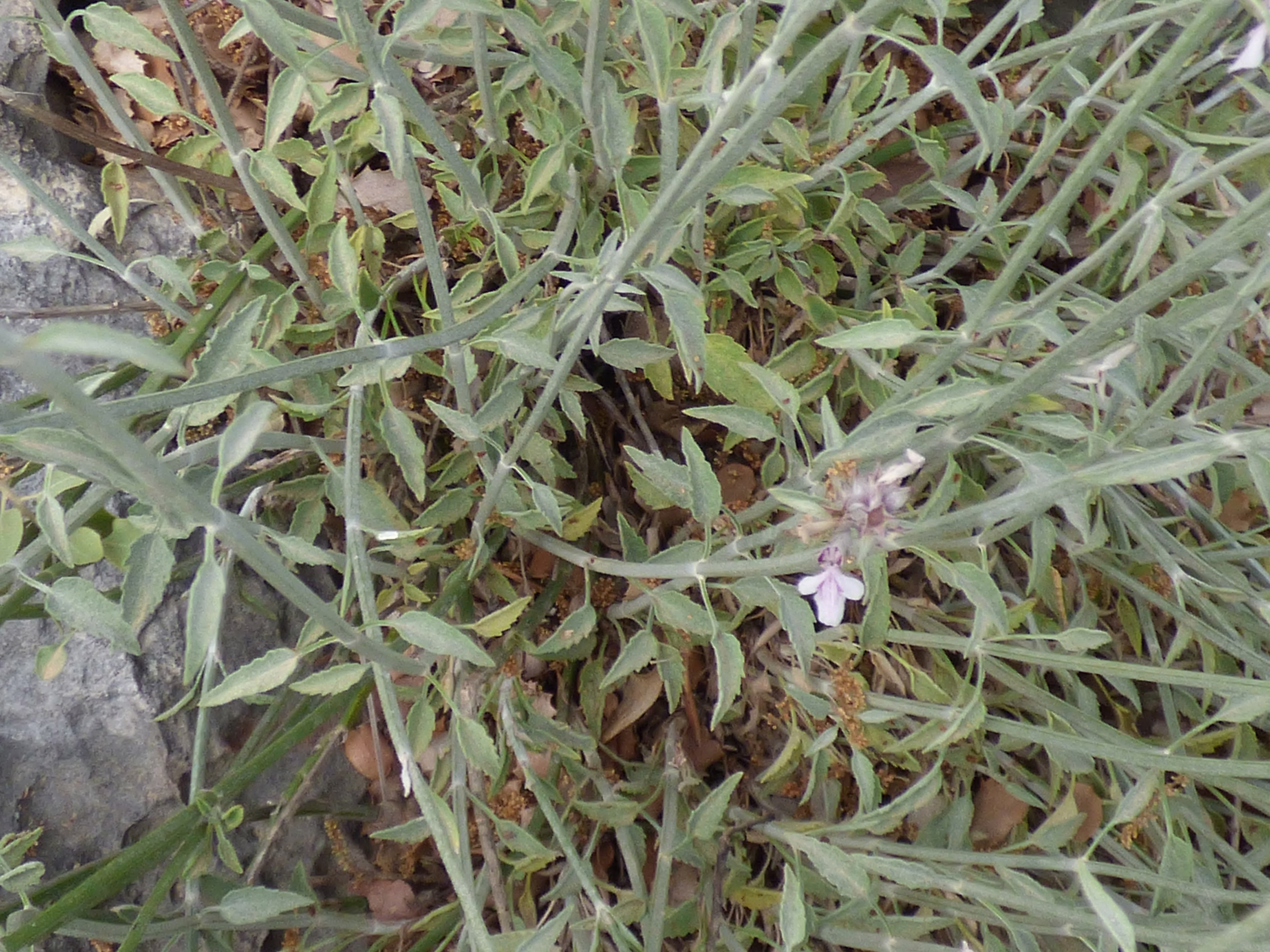
Leaves, moderately sized, whitish at first as are the many stems

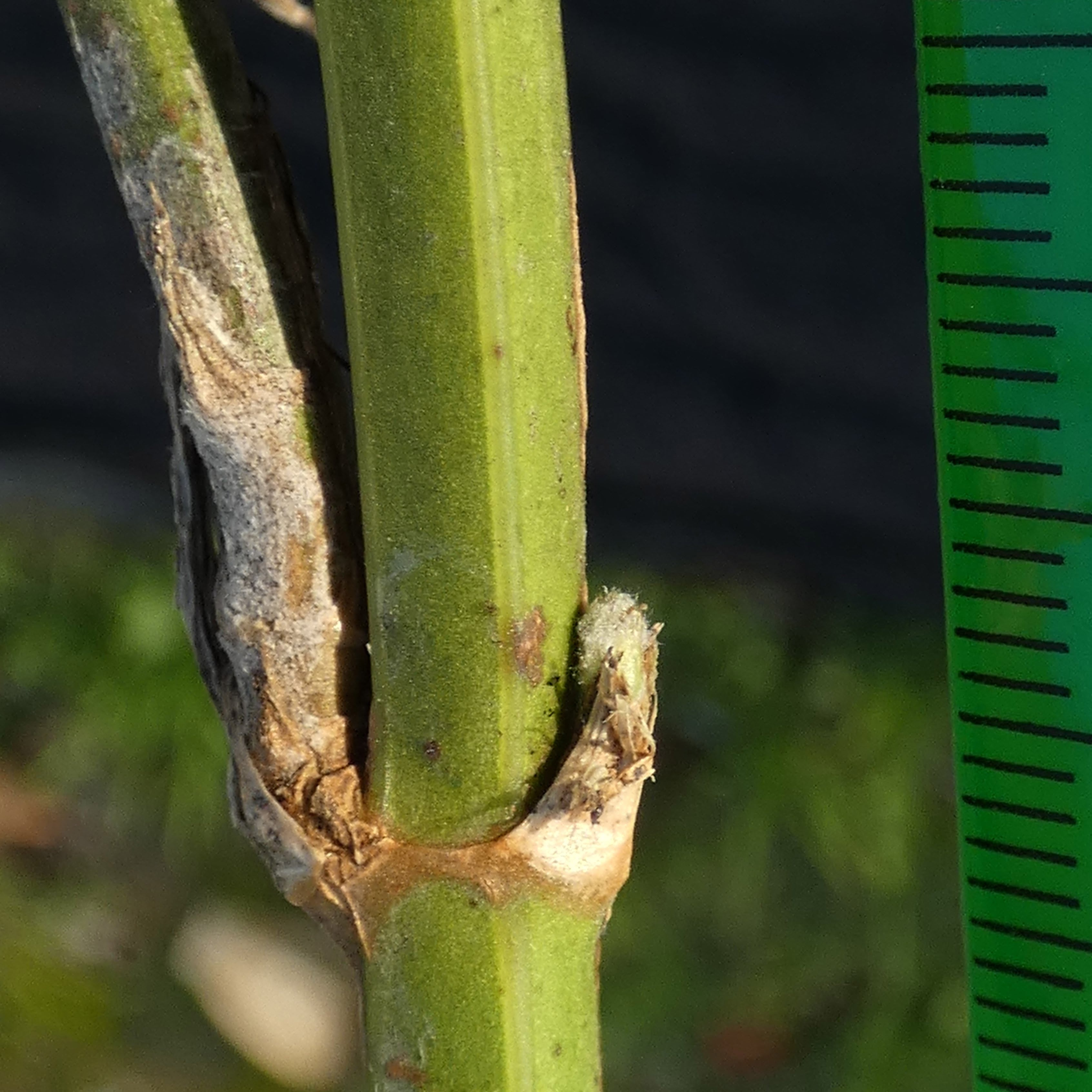
White surface mostly or fully lost at maturity

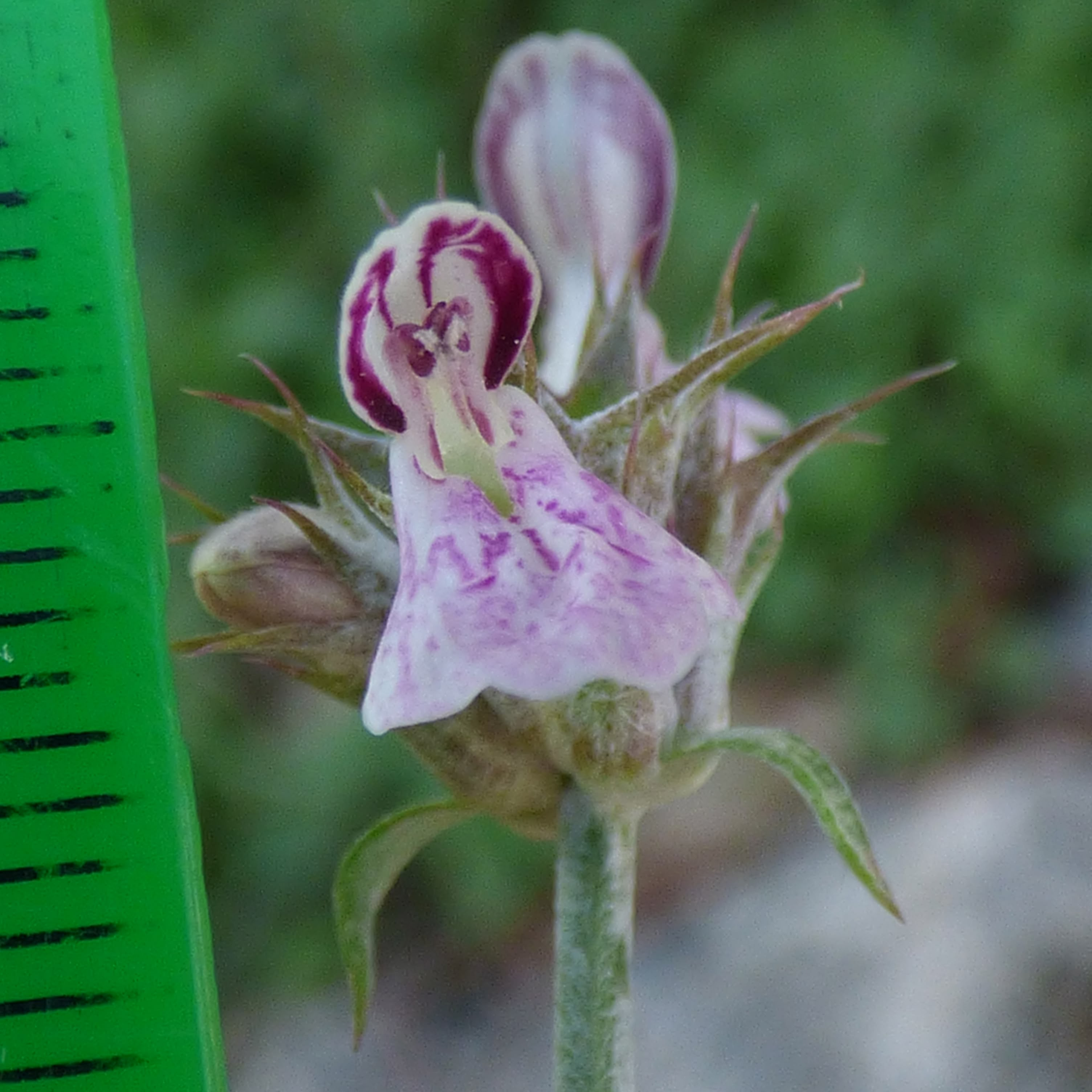
White flowers with purple markings, sometimes looking over all pink

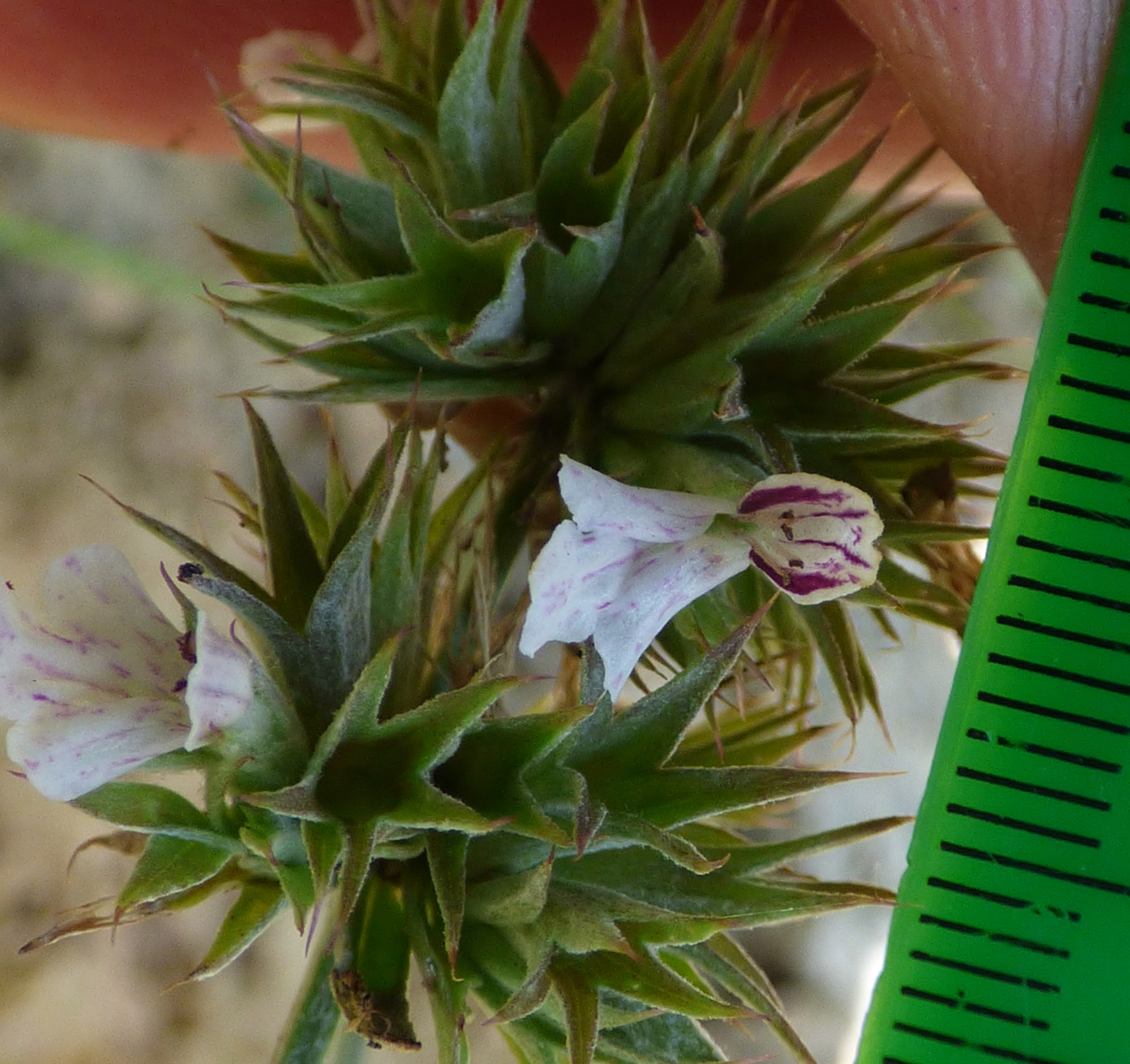
Spinescent calyx lobes, maturing

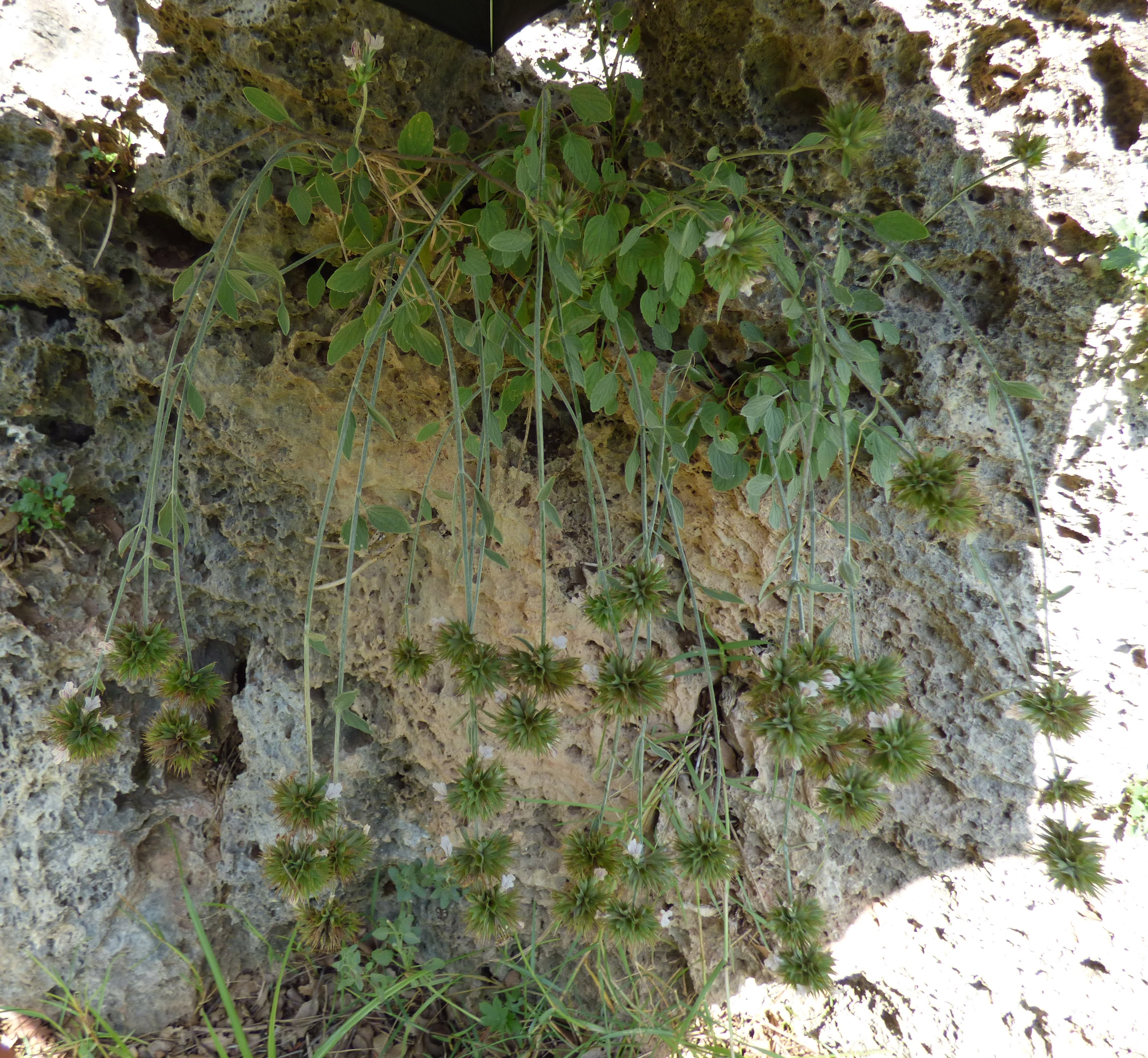
Whorls of spinescent calyx lobes

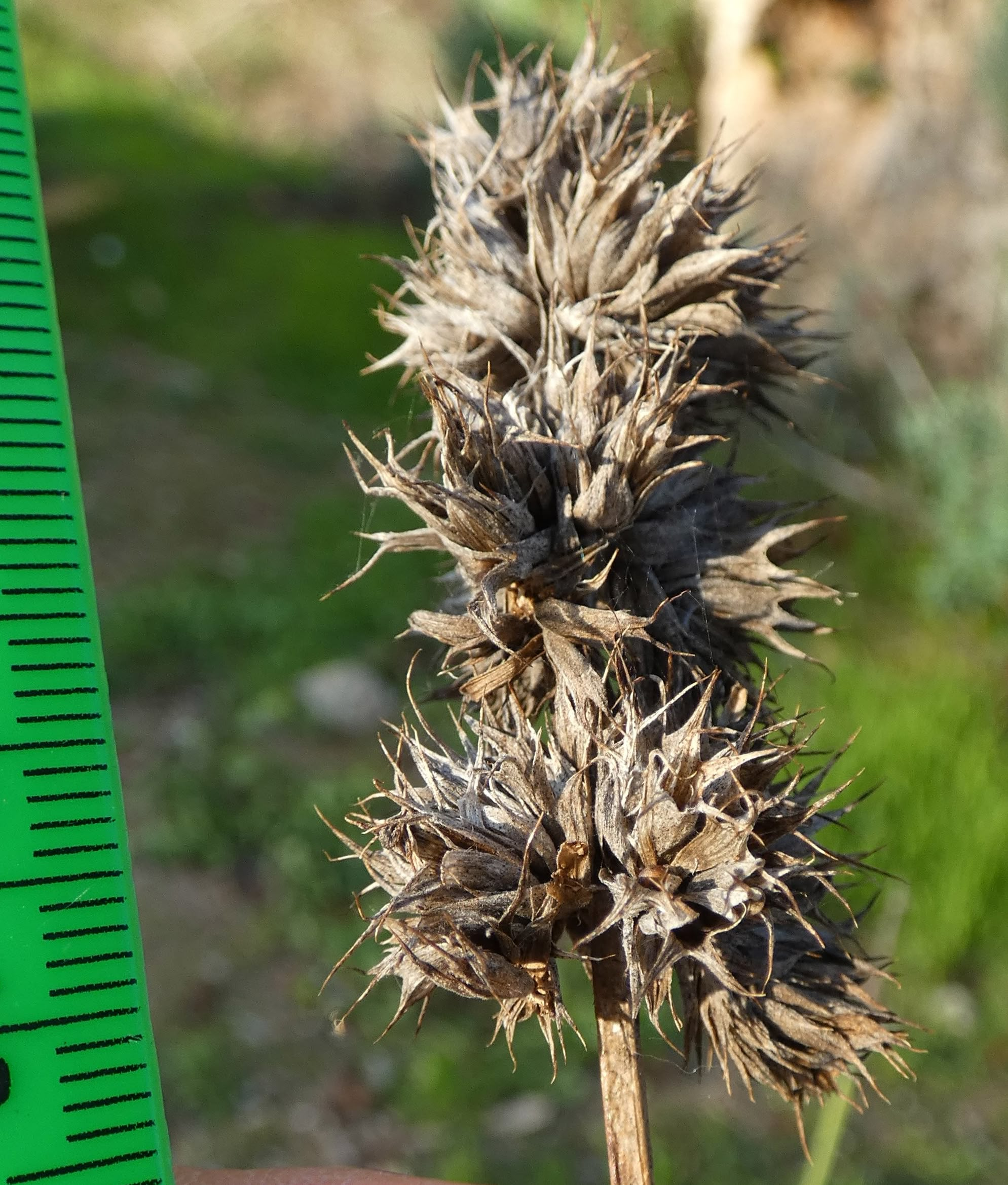
Mature state of whorls, from the stem top, where they are close together

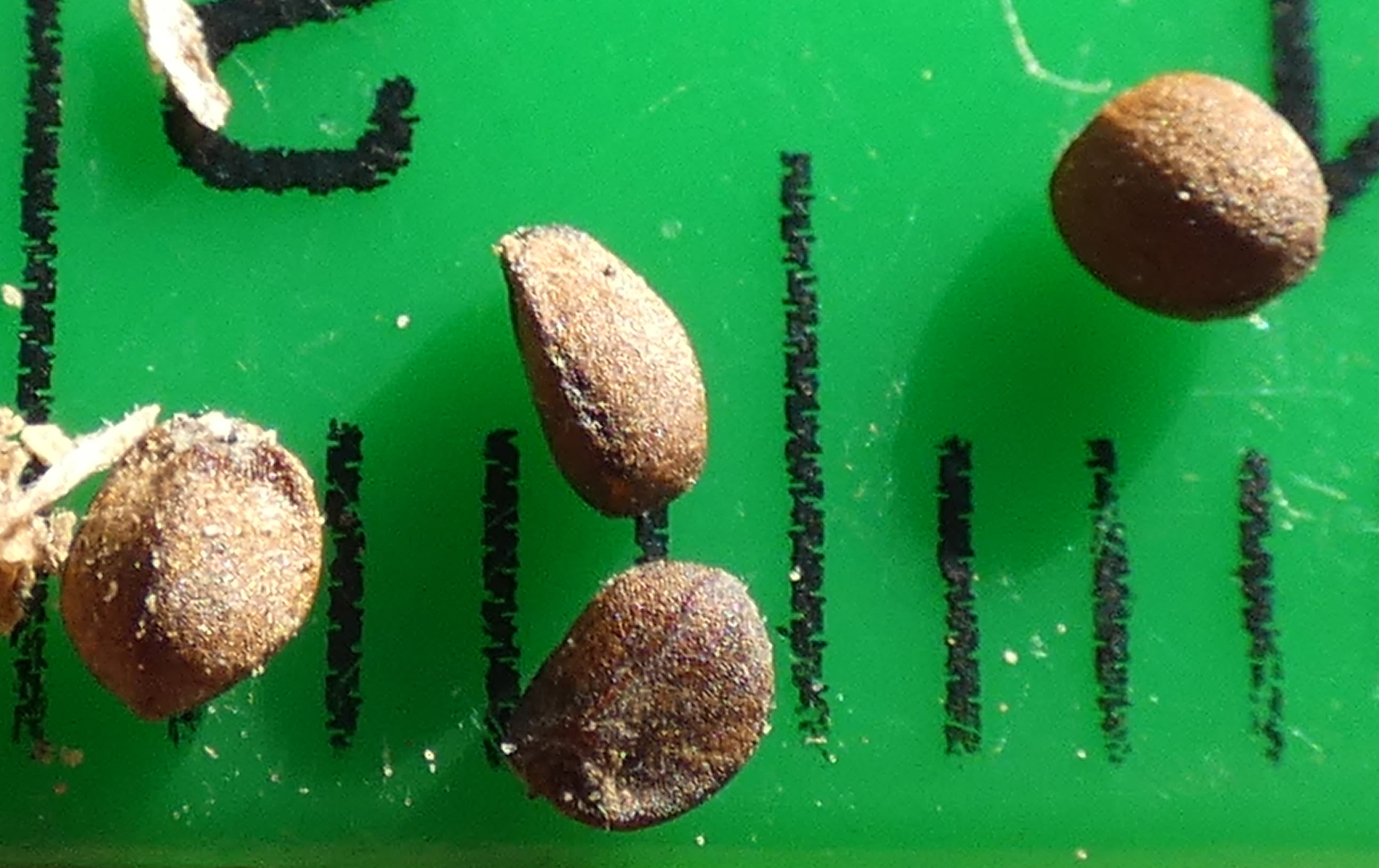
Nutlets
