= Arachnoid (botany) =

Botanical term

Arachnoid organs, such as leaves or stems, have an external appearance similar to cobwebs – the appearance of being covered with fine, white, usually tangled hairs. This can cause plants to appear grey or white. The arachnoid appearance is common on the leaves and stems of various sclerophyllous members of the family Asteraceae, such as some thistles. The arachnoid appearance of Haworthia arachnoidea arises from the spinescent leaf denticles, and the arachnoid appearance of the cactus Cephalocereus senilis is from long-lasting hairy spines. In its native desert environment, arachnoid pubescence helps Cephalocereus senilis to retain moisture, reflect harmful sun rays, and manage temperature fluctuation.

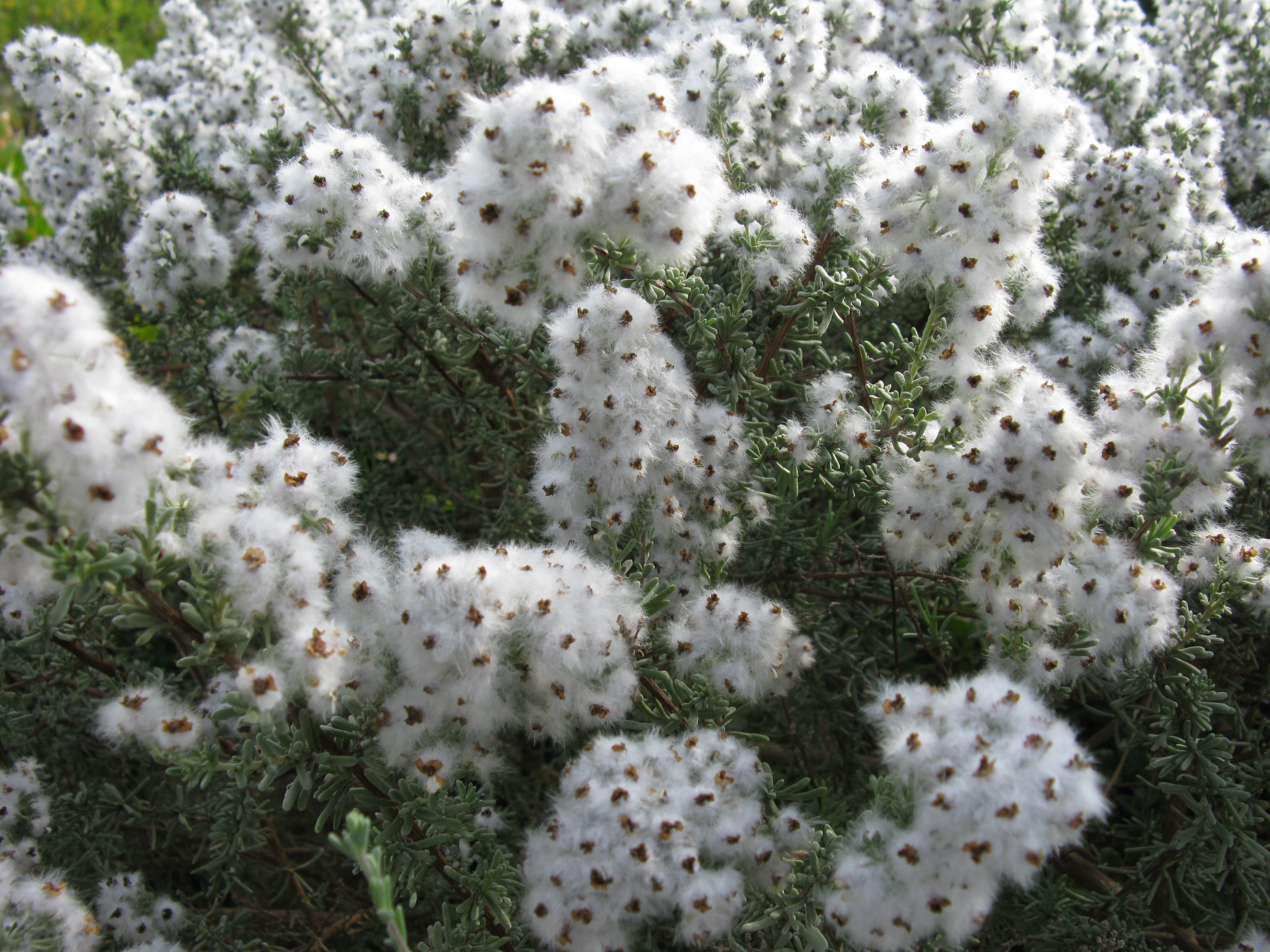
Eriocephalus africanus, showing lightly arachnoid leaves and heavily arachnoid seed follicles

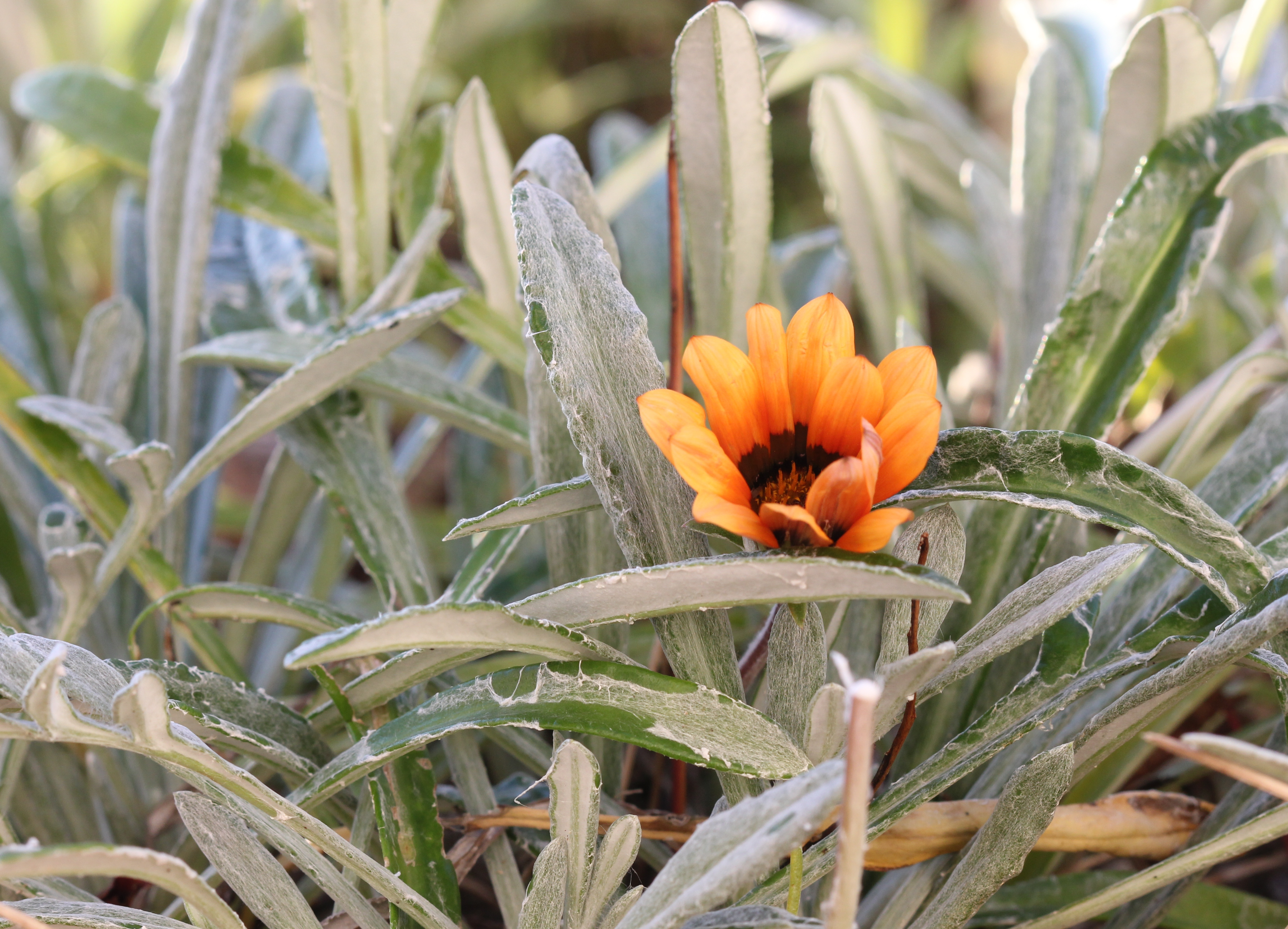
The arachnoid leaves of this Gazania are covered with a fragile cobwebby felt.

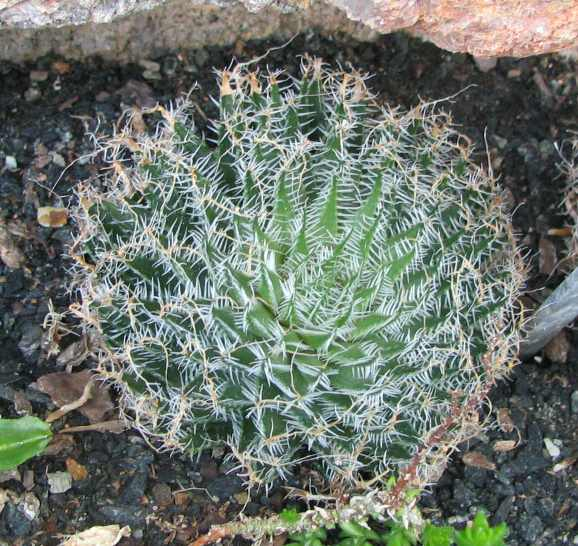
Haworthia arachnoidea, the cobweb aloe, has a spidery appearance.

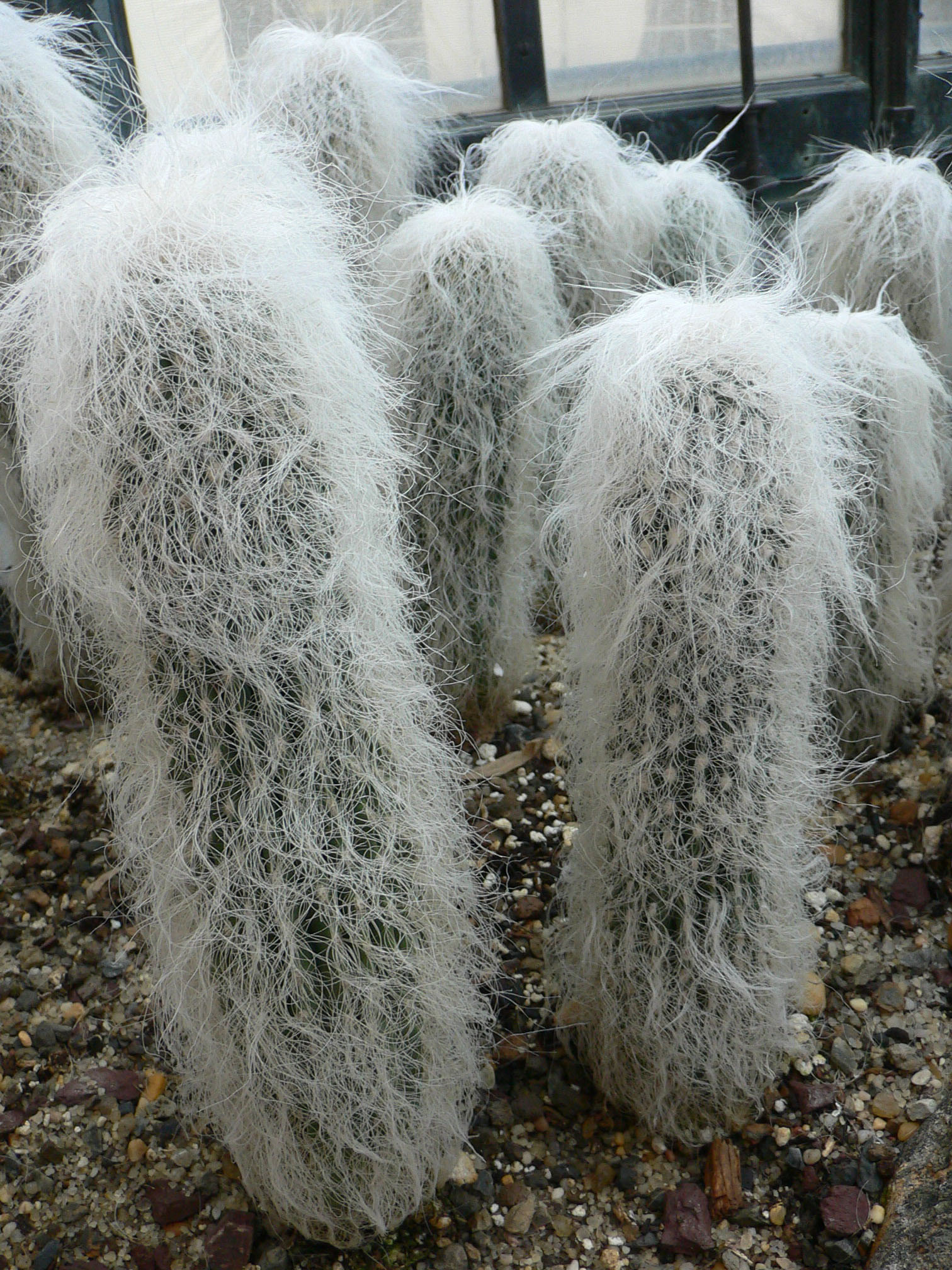
Cephalocereus senilis has an arachnoid effect created by modified spines.

== See also ==
- Arachnoid (disambiguation)
