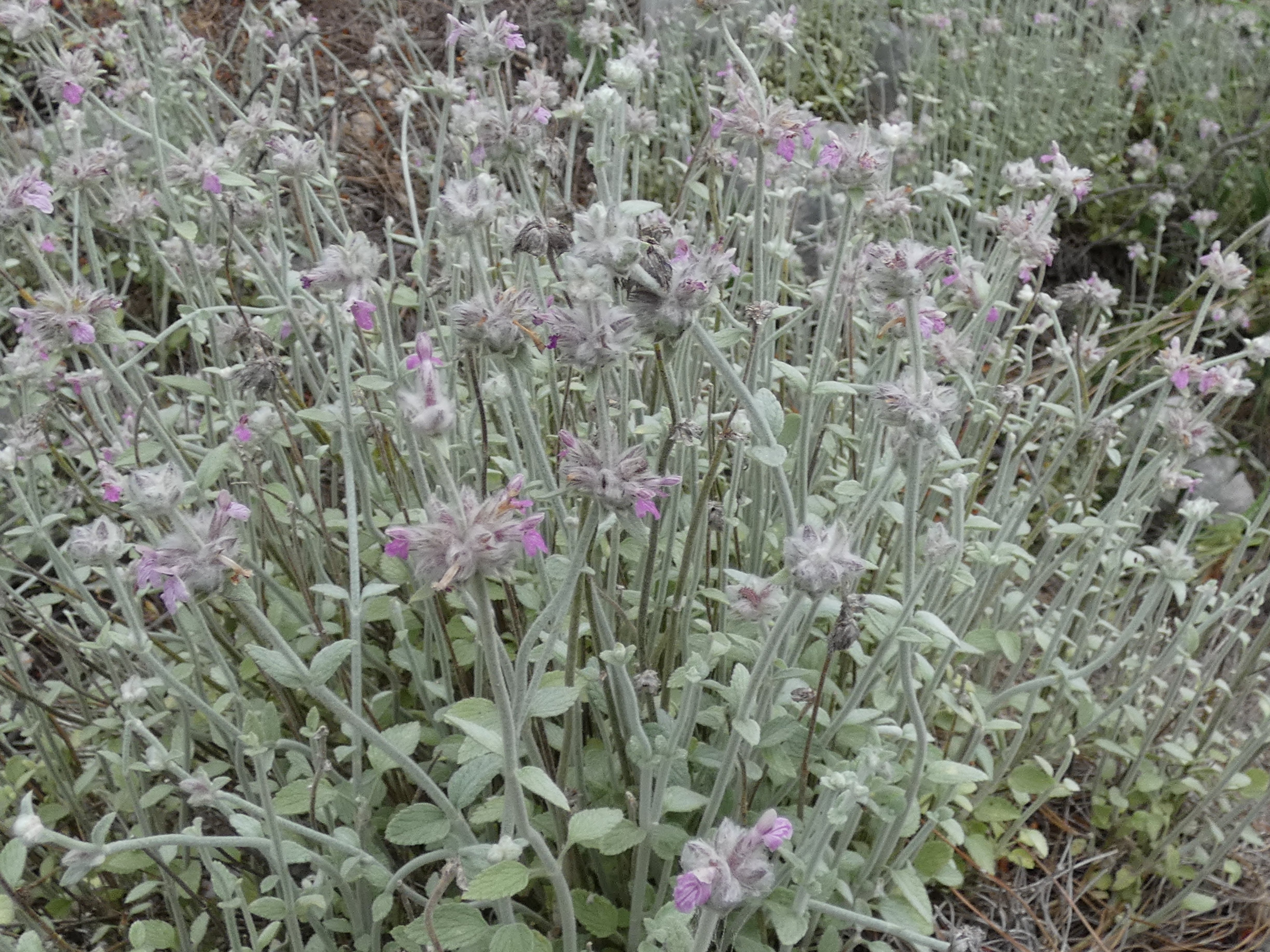

Scientific classification
- Kingdom: Plantae
- Clade: Tracheophytes
- Clade: Angiosperms
- Clade: Eudicots
- Clade: Asterids
- Order: Lamiales
- Family: Lamiaceae
- Genus: Stachys
- Species: S. bombycina

Binomial name
- Stachys bombycina Boiss.

= Stachys bombycina =

Species of flowering plant

Stachys bombycina is a species of flowering plant in the family Lamiaceae endemic to the SW coastal regions of Turkey. It was first published in 1853.

== Description ==
Stachys bombycina is a woody-based, perennial herb with many moderately long, fairly simple-looking upright woolly stems (to 50 cm), growing on calcareous rocks or rocky typically under Pinus brutia woods near the coast, at an altitude of 10–600 m.

The stems and leaves are whitened with a dense layer of woolly hair on the surface, persisting at maturity. The leaves are moderately sized (to 2.5 x 2 cm), oval, and crenate-serrate toothed. Its flowers are in 1-2(4) well-separated whorls on the upper parts of the stems. The flowers are pale to moderate purple, with stronger markings, each very short-stalked, with a woolly-covered calyx whose 5 lobes are not strongly spiny-ended, and at maturity these lobes do not recurve out but remain erect or a little spreading.

As an endemic growing in a limited number of wooded areas subject to human deforestation and close beside expanding tourist areas, the conservation status of this species is regarded as VU (Vulnerable) (IUCN 2017).

Photographic details can be seen on iNaturalist.

Similar plants it might be confused with are Stachys aleurites (having more (2-6) whorls, the upper ones often close together, flowers that are white with pink markings (which may appear generally pink), only a thin whiteness to stems and leaves that mostly or completely disappears in old age, and conspicuously spinescent calyx lobes that curve out at maturity); Stachys distans (having slightly more (1-4(5)), well-spaced whorls and stems that also remain felty white in old age, but with white flowers and calyx lobes that are spiny-ended and curve out in maturity); and S. pseudobombycina, which was synonymised with S. bombycina by Akçiçek (2012)).

== Photographic description ==
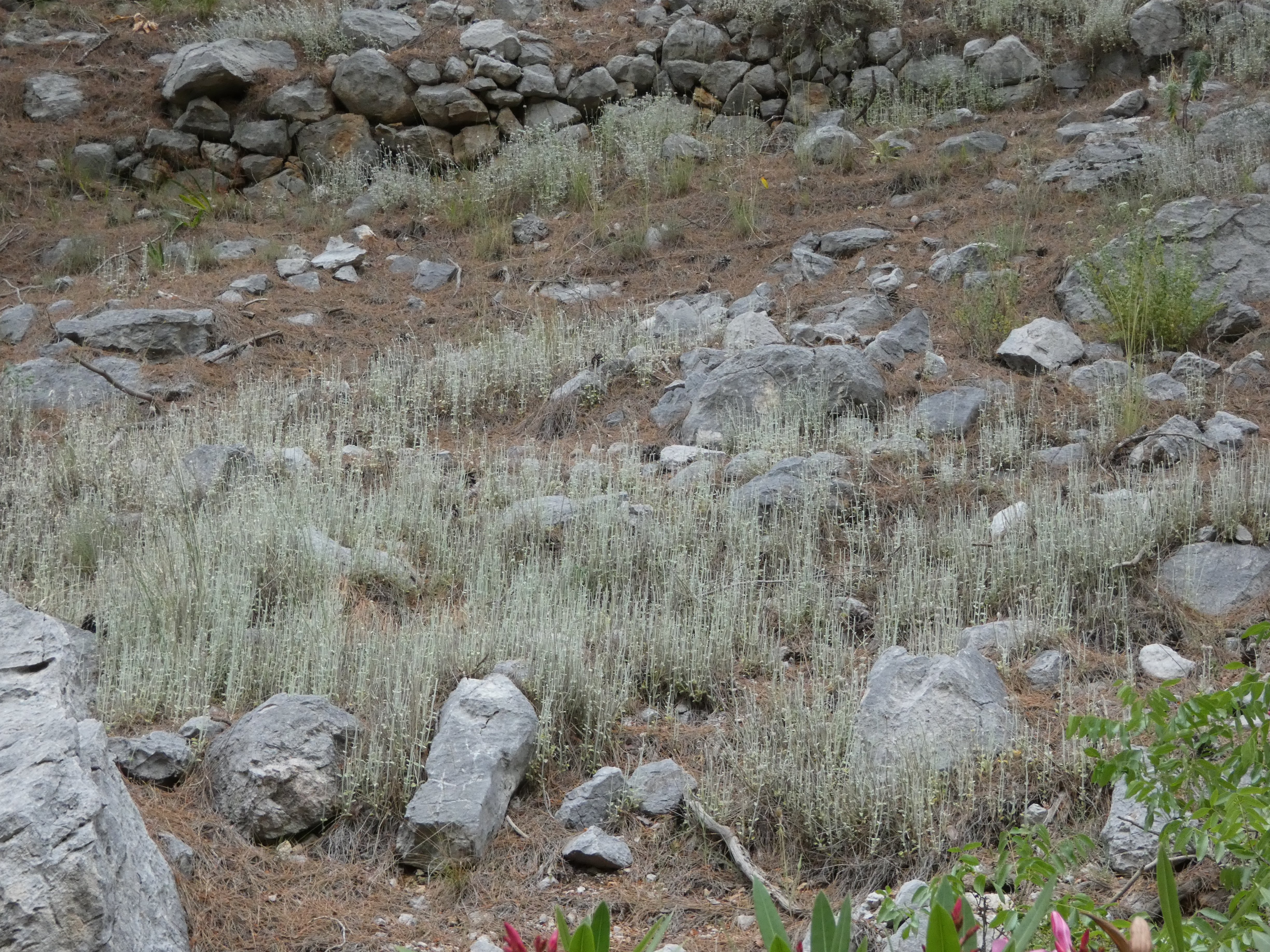
Appearance in woodland ground

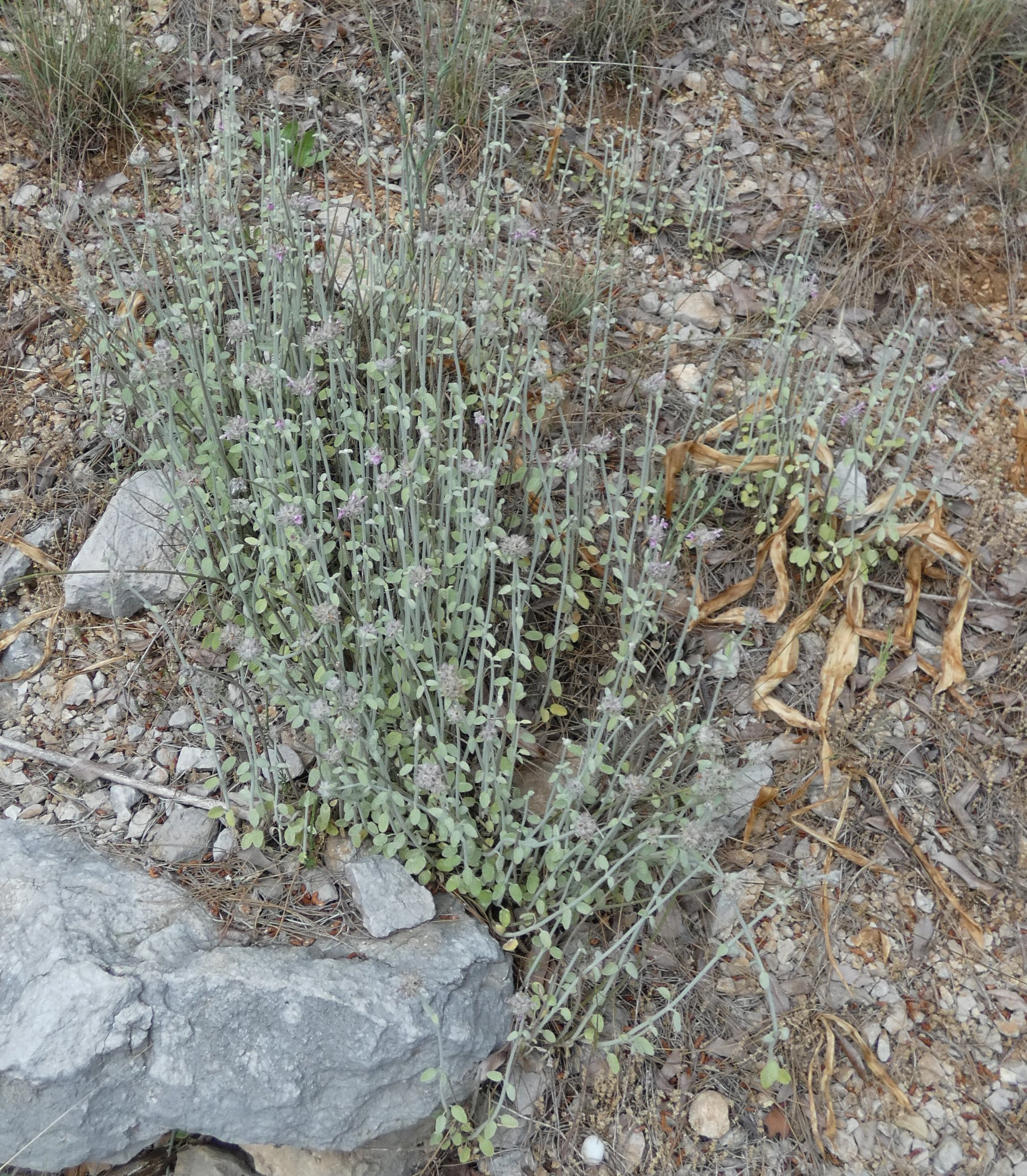
Appearance close up

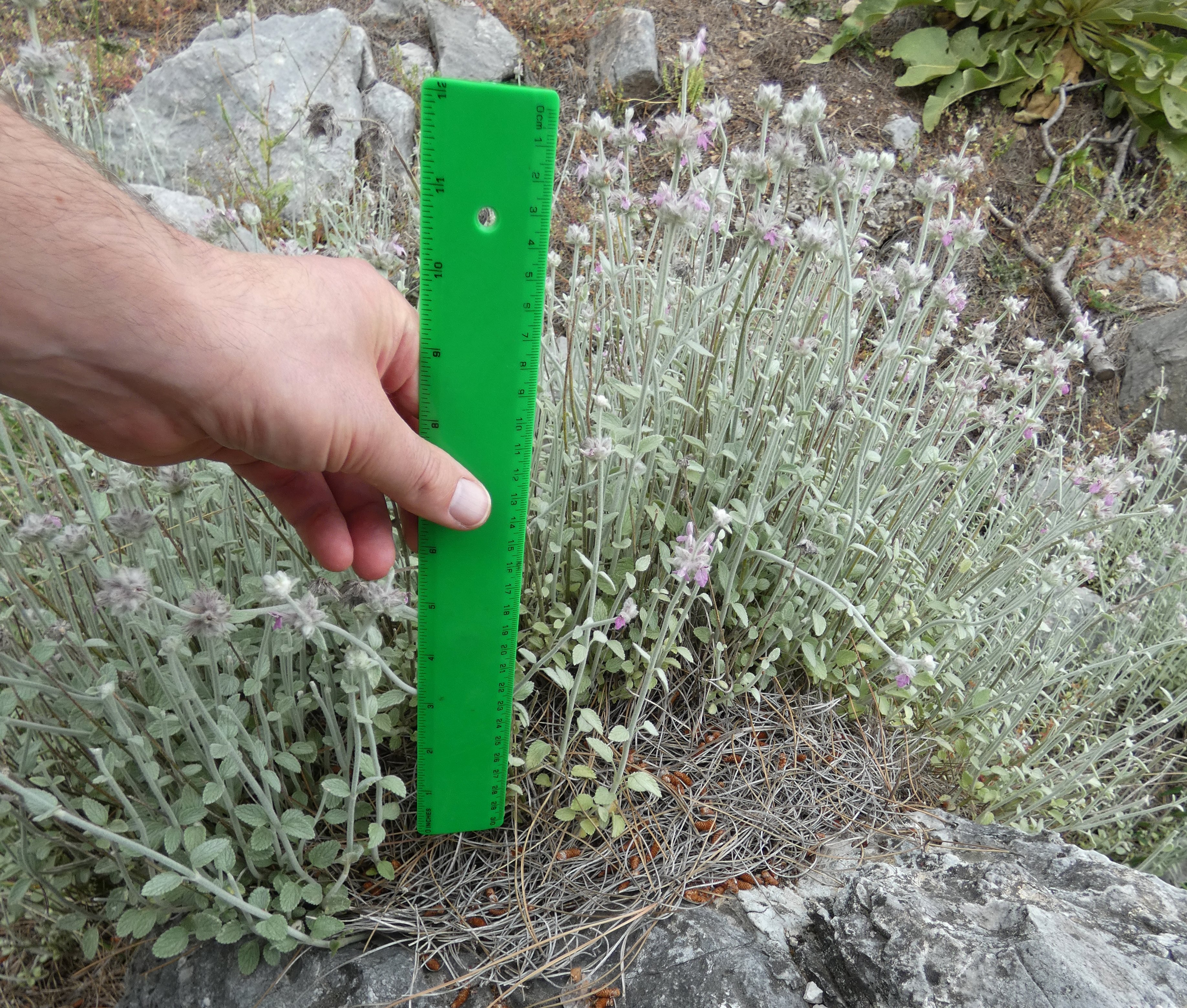
Moderate upright stems, moderate leaves, all parts woolly

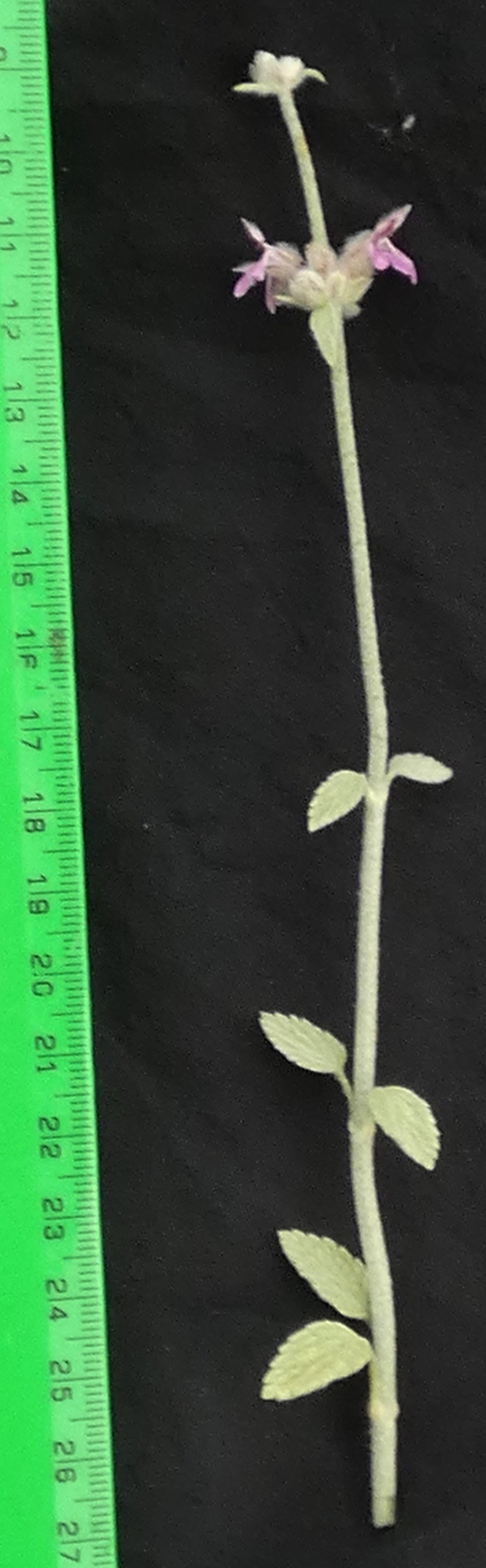
Stem

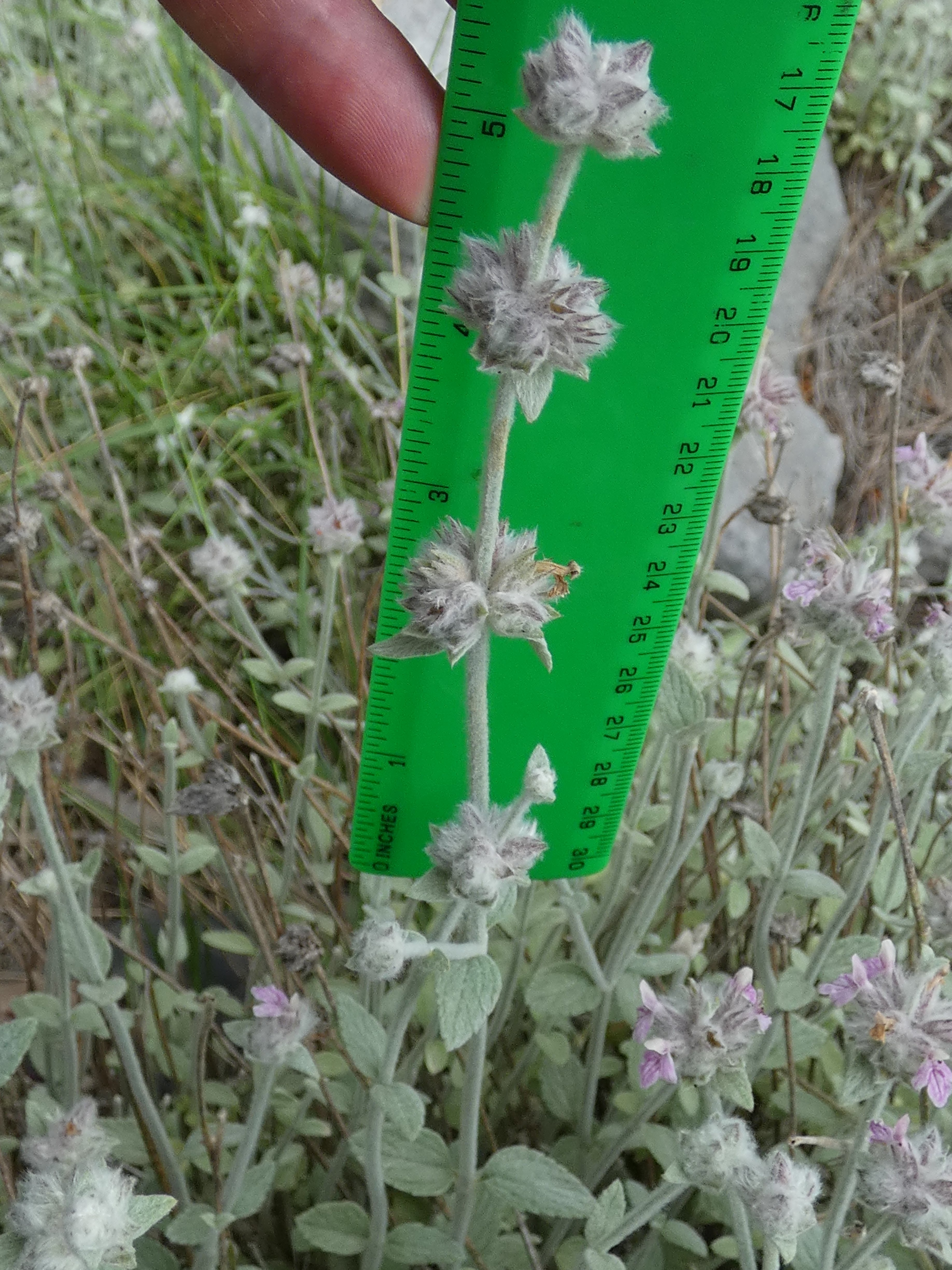
Example with 3 whorls, normally about 1-2, and a stem branch

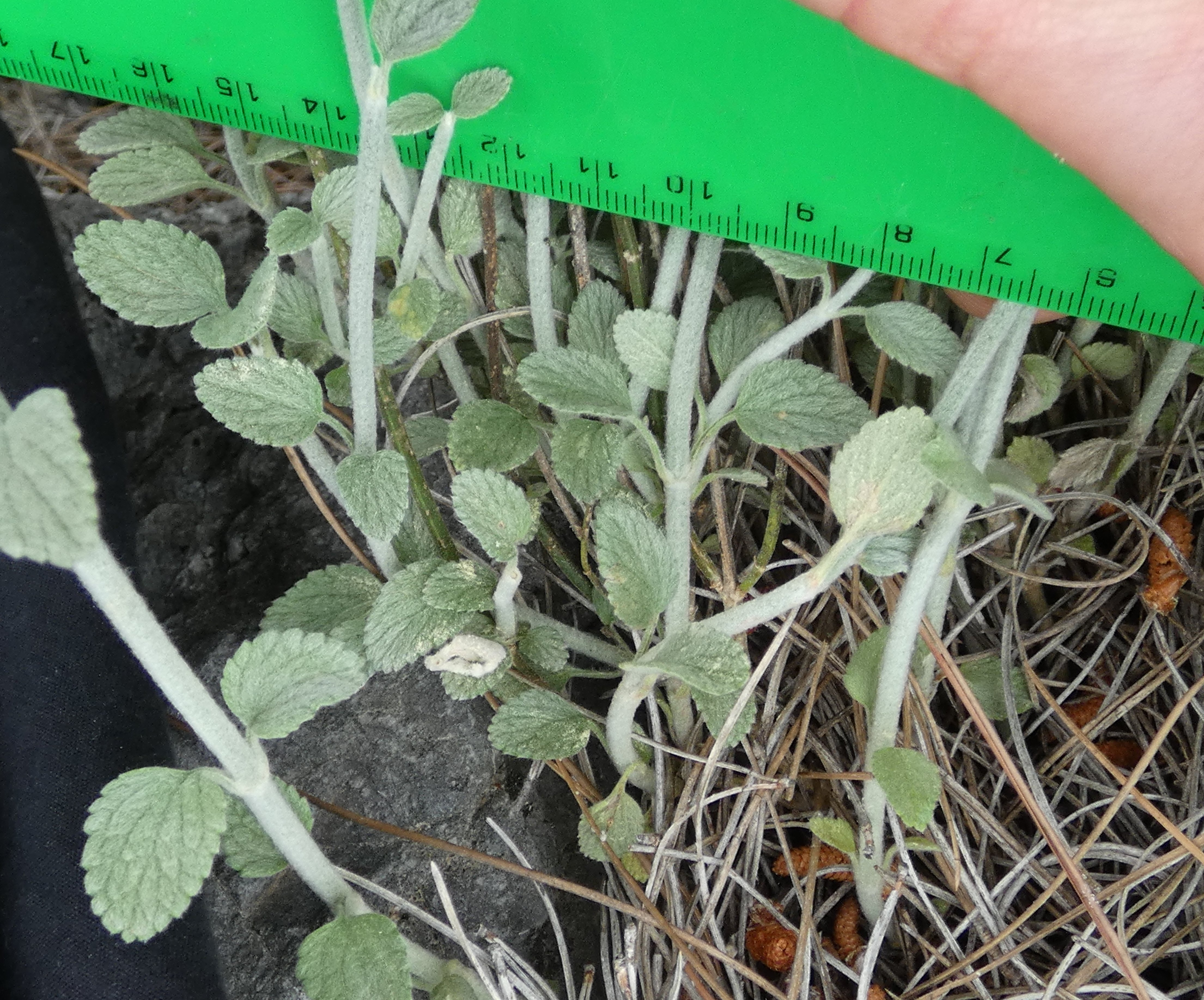
Lower leaves

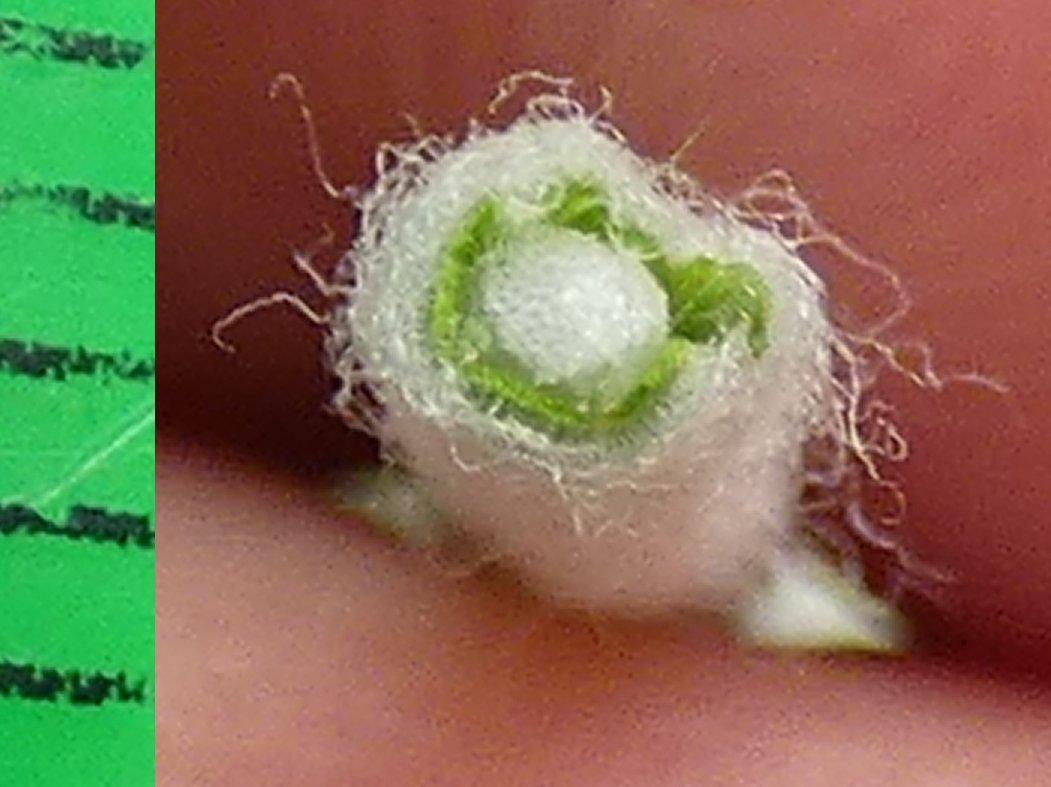
Thick stem wool

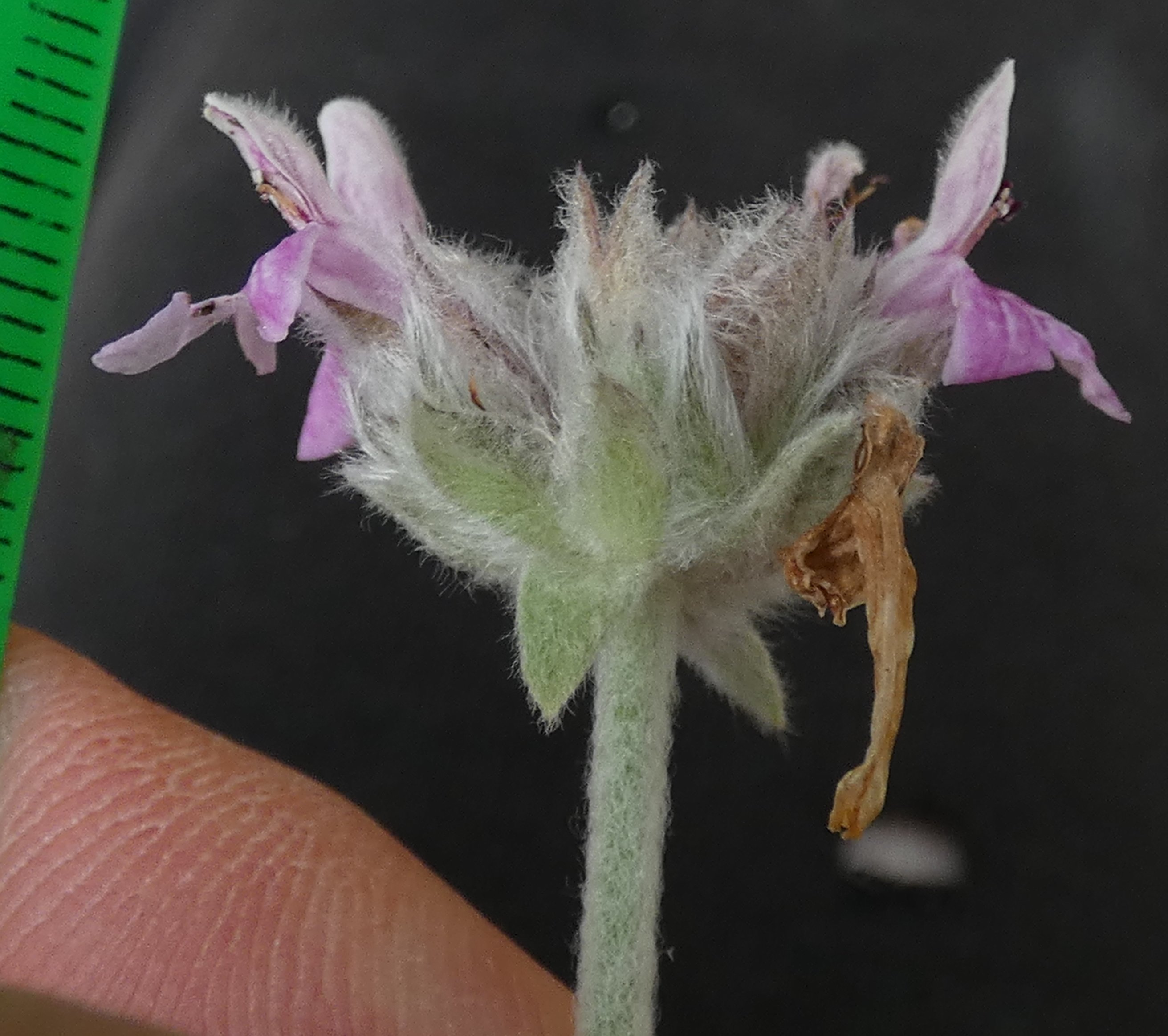
Flowering calyxes, woolly, not spinescent

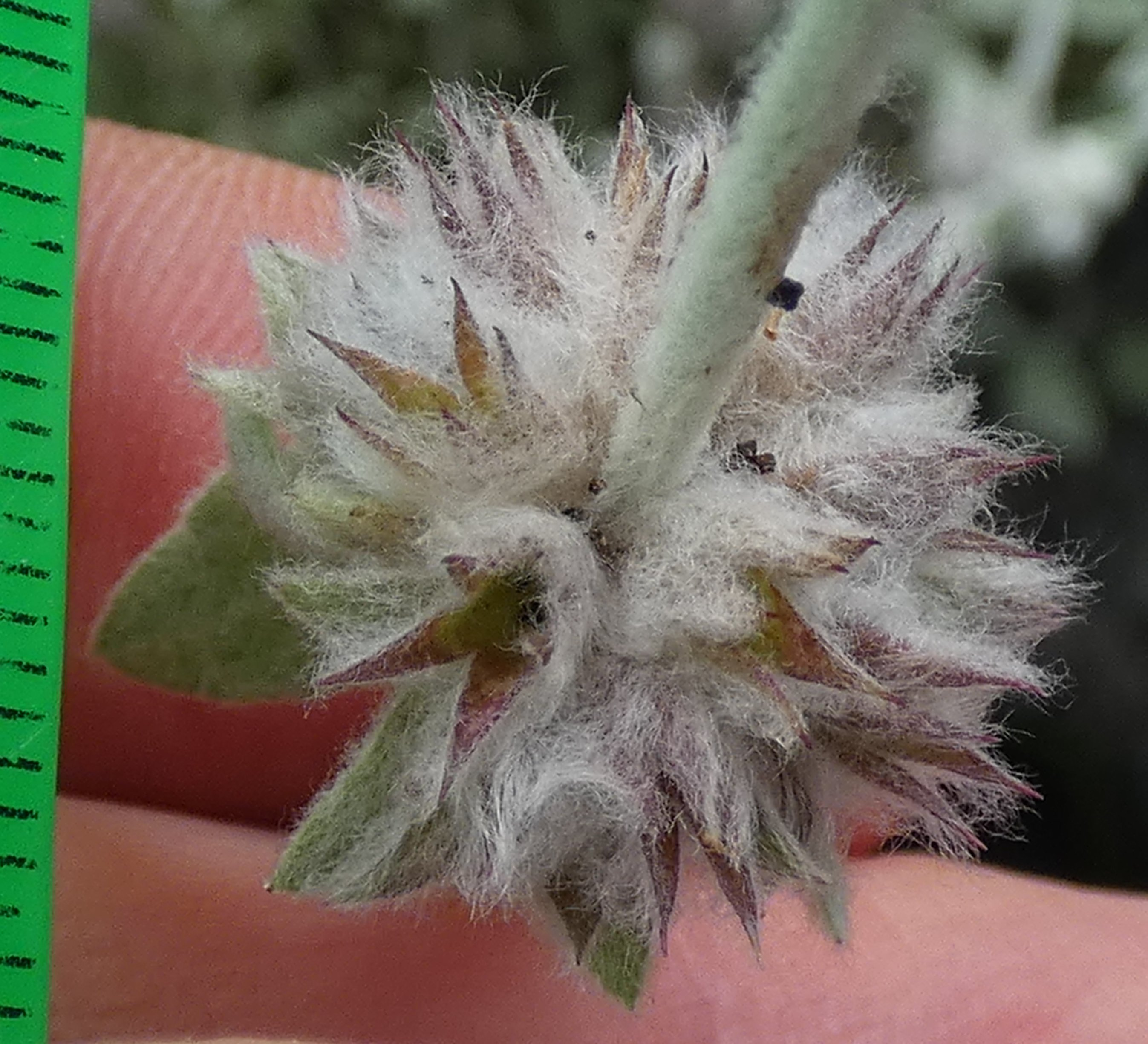
Flowered calyxes

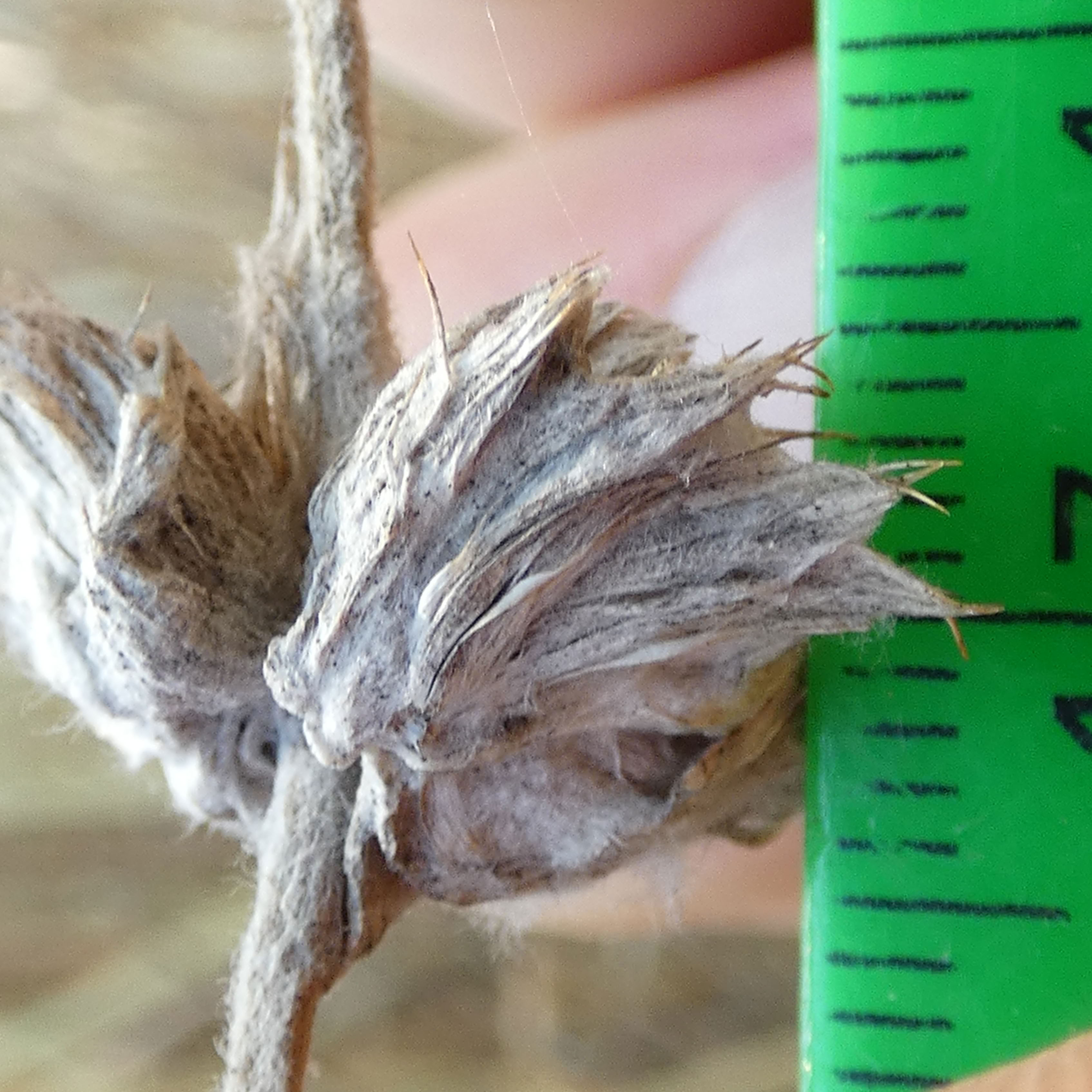
Mature calyxes not spinescent or recurving out

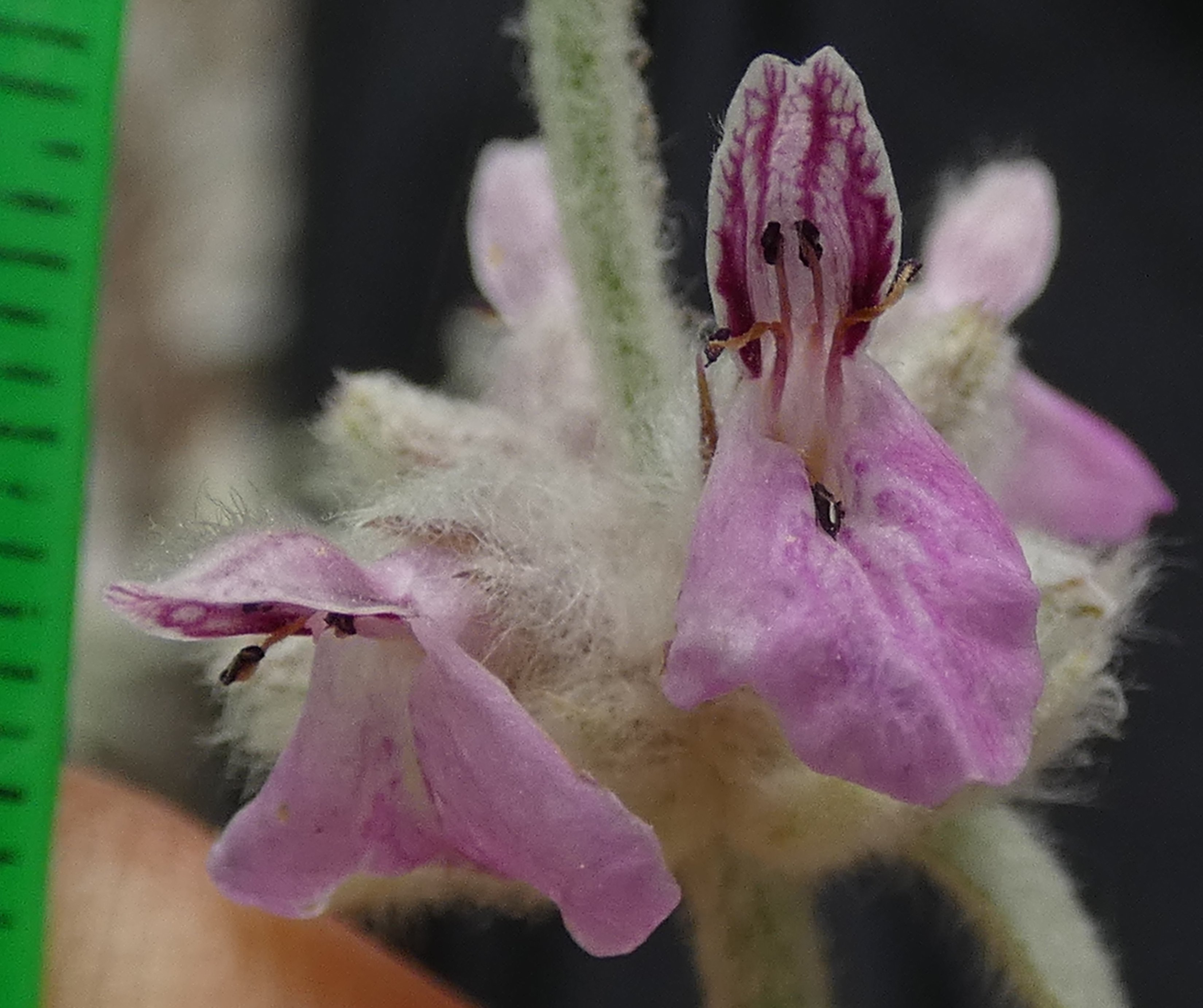
Flowers in situ

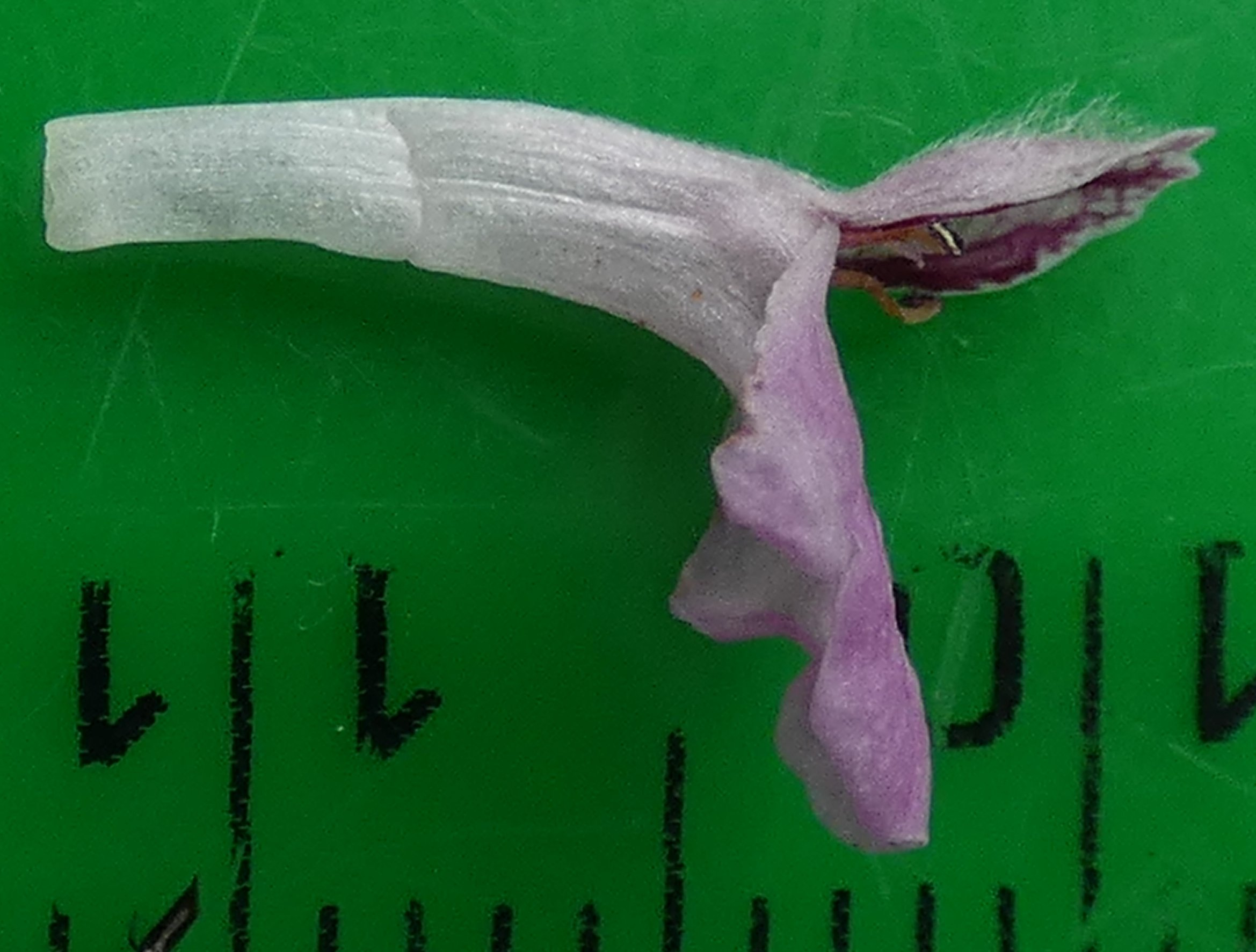
Flower

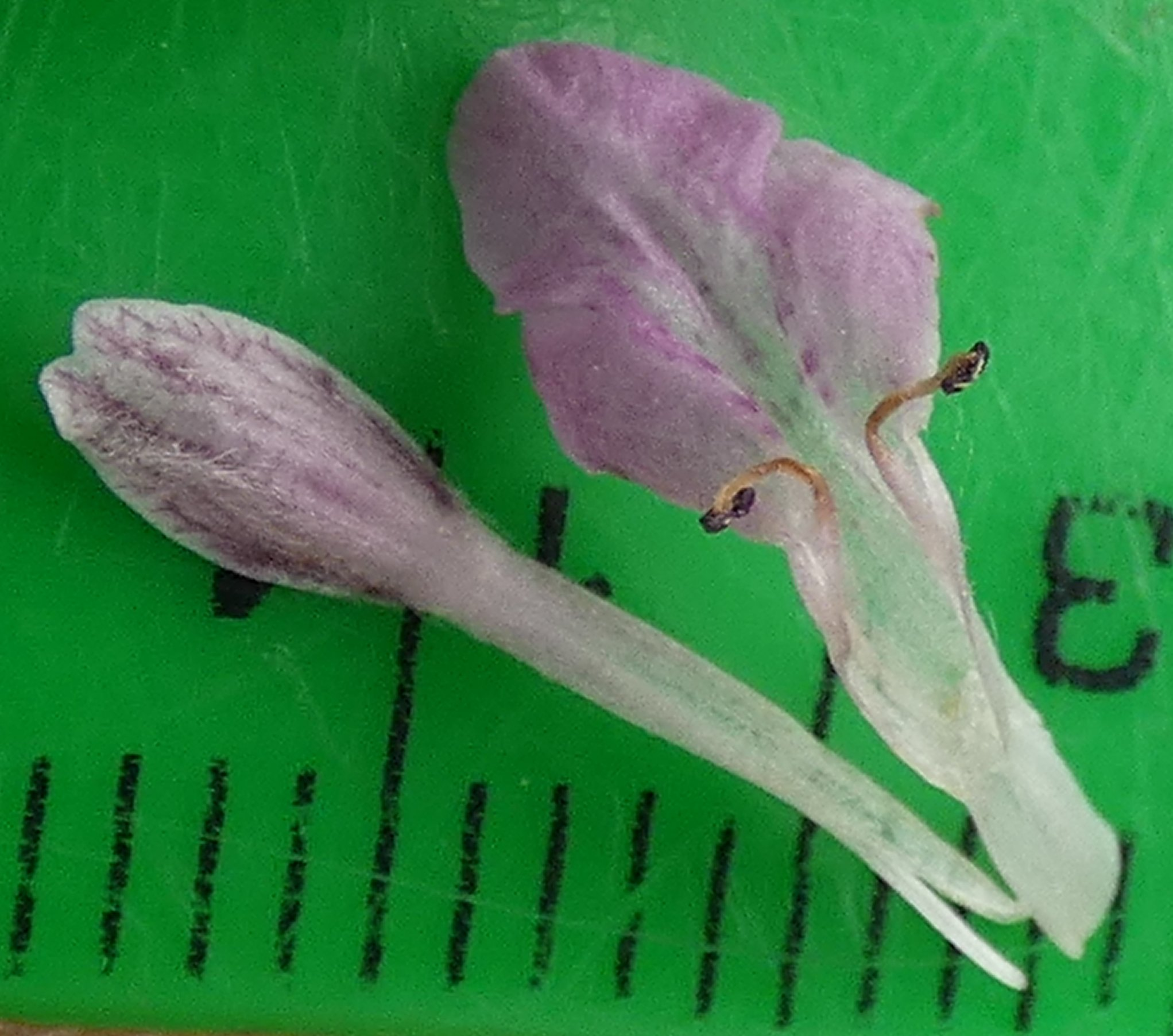
Flower parts

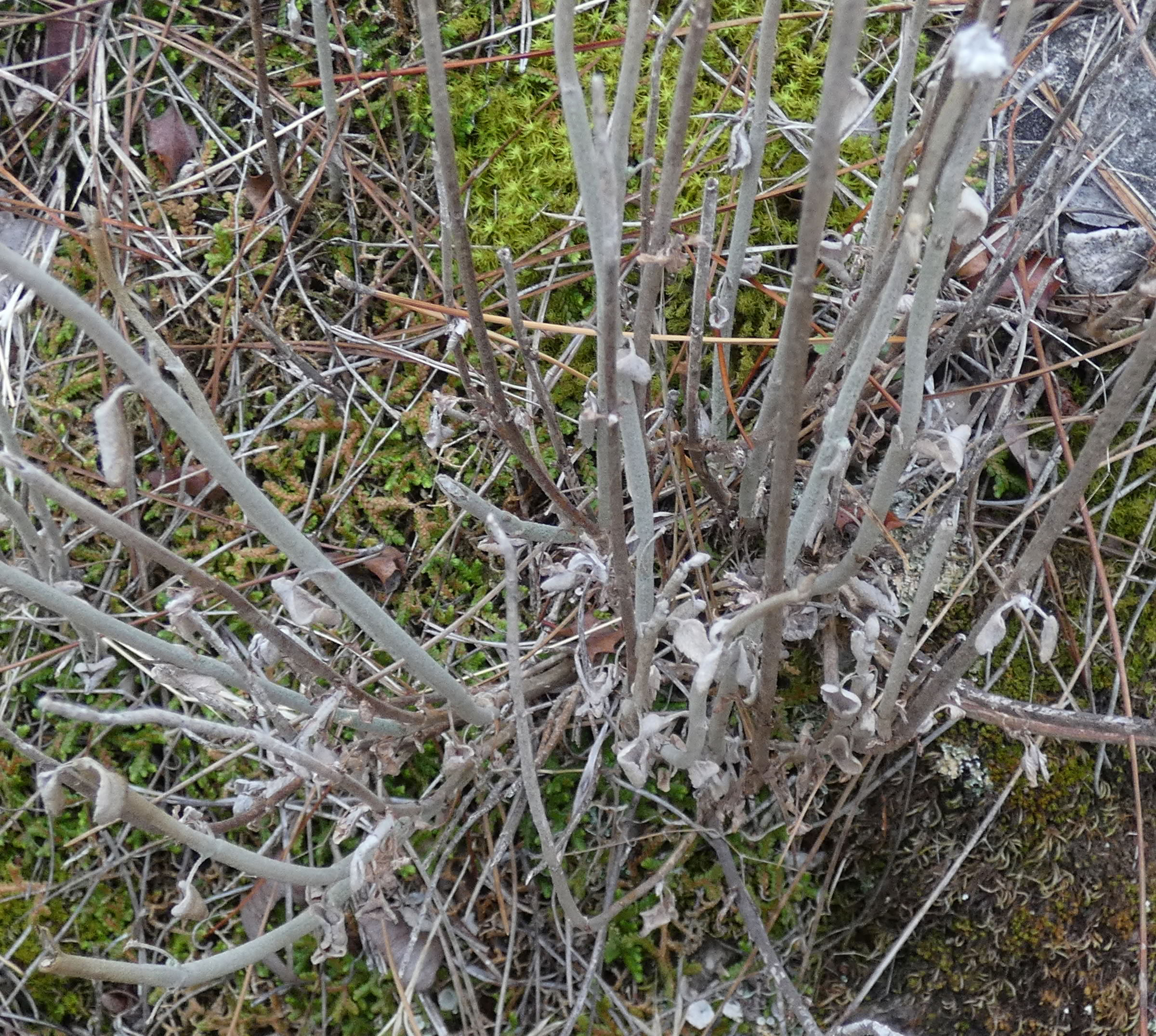
Wool persists past maturity
