= Arachne (disambiguation) =

Arachne is a figure in Greek mythology.

It may also refer to:

- Arachne (Internet suite)
- Arachne (archaeological database)
- 407 Arachne, an asteroid
- Julia Carpenter, a superheroine also called Arachne
- A group of characters in Sonic the Hedgehog (comic series)
- Arachne (Devil May Cry), a demoness in the video game Devil May Cry
- A character in Soul Eater, a manga series
- Sarah Hayes (crossword compiler), who uses the pseudonym Arachne.
