= Arachnoid =

Arachnoid may refer to:

- Relating to arachnids
- Arachnoid (astrogeology), a geological structure found only on the planet Venus
- Arachnoid (botany), referring to organs with a cobwebby exterior appearance
- Arachnoid granulation, small protrusions of the arachnoid mater
- Arachnoid mater, a layer of the meninges, membranes that contain the central nervous system

== See also ==
- Arkanoid, an arcade game
