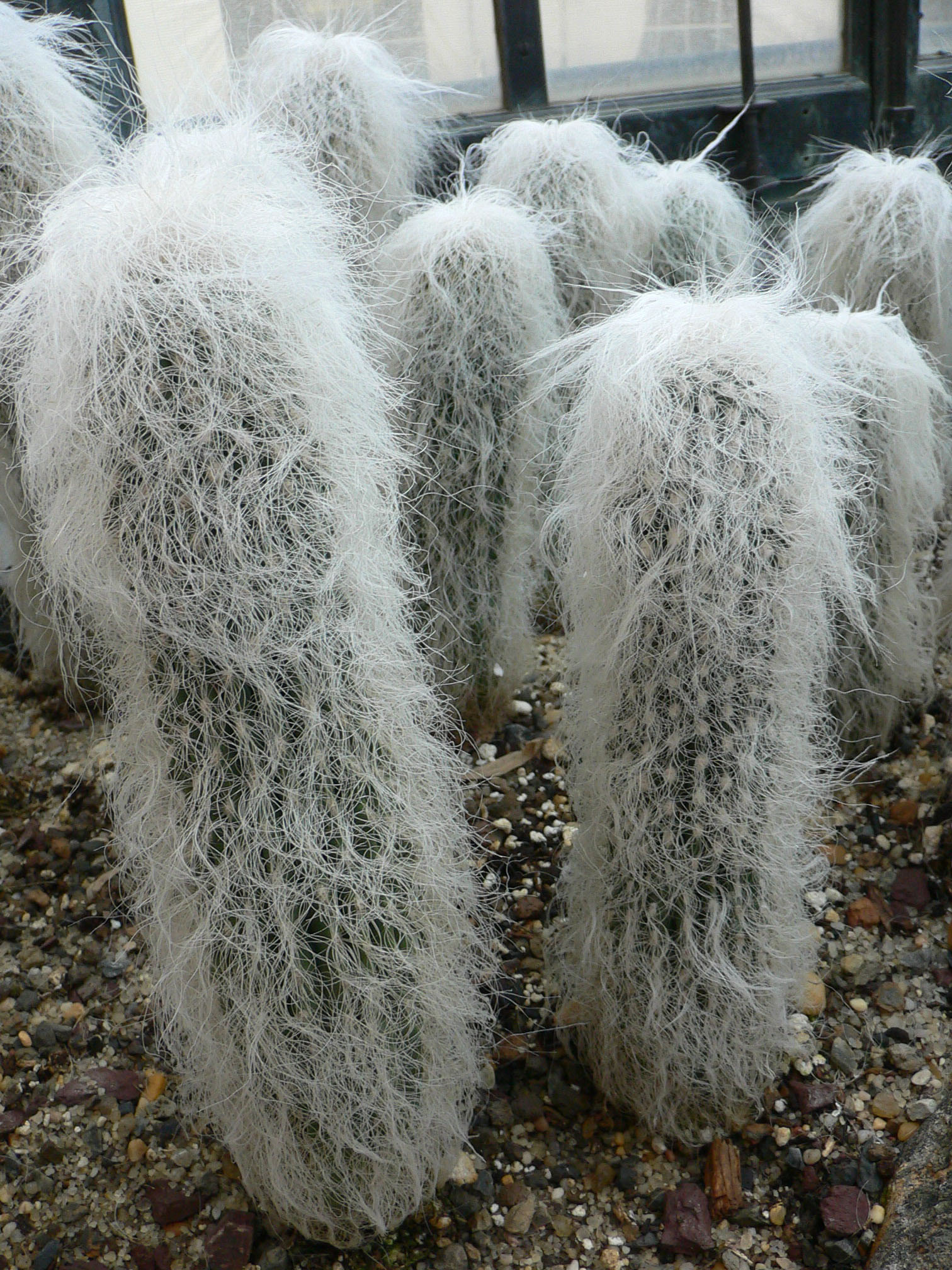

Conservation status
- Endangered (IUCN 3.1)

Scientific classification
- Kingdom: Plantae
- Clade: Embryophytes
- Clade: Tracheophytes
- Clade: Spermatophytes
- Clade: Angiosperms
- Clade: Eudicots
- Order: Caryophyllales
- Family: Cactaceae
- Subfamily: Cactoideae
- Genus: Cephalocereus
- Species: C. senilis

Binomial name
- Cephalocereus senilis (Haw.) Pfeiff.

Synonyms
- Cactus bradypus Lehm.; Cactus senilis Haw.; Cephalophorus senilis (Haw.) Lem.; Cereus bradypus (Lehm.) Steud.; Euporteria senilis (Haw.) Kreuz. & Buining; Melocactus bradypus Lehm. ex Steud.; Pilocereus senilis (Haw.) Lem.

= Cephalocereus senilis =

Species of plant

Cephalocereus senilis, the old man cactus, is a species of cactus native to Hidalgo and Veracruz in central Mexico. It is threatened in the wild, but widespread propagation and popularity in cultivation have reduced the demand on wild populations.

== Description ==
Cephalocereus senilis is a tall, columnar species with clusters of stems that may grow to 5–15 m tall; the individual stems are usually unbranched, being unable to withstand the weight of side branches adequately. These vertical columns emerge from a massive underground rhizome. The most striking feature is the shaggy coat of long, white hairs suggestive of unkempt hair on an old man. The coat is a particularly striking silvery white on the young cactus; as the plant ages the stem begins to lose its covering. The flowers are red, yellow, or white, though the plant may not flower until 10–20 years old.

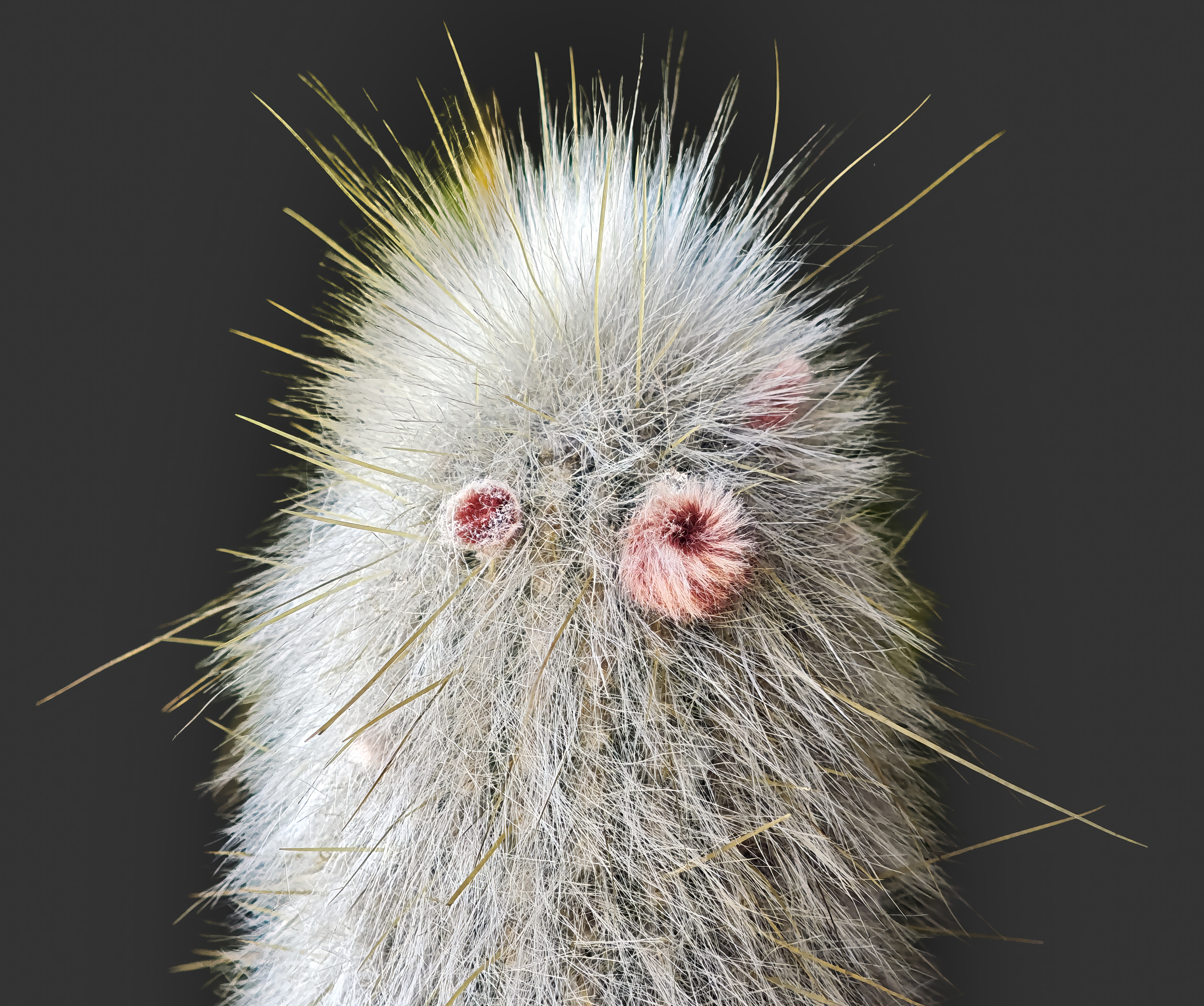
flower buds

== Morphology and function of the coat ==
The hairs are modified spines and they make many a plant appear almost snow-white; they serve to protect the plant from frost and sun. However, the hairs are only the radial spines of the cactus; they conceal formidable sharp yellow central spines that belie the inoffensive appearance of the hairy covering.

== Cultivation ==
Cephalocereus senilis is a very popular cactus in cultivation, grown for its woolly appearance. It prefers a very well-drained soil mix (more so than many other cacti), and much bright sunlight, which encourages growth of the hair.
