= Desert Garden Conservatory =

Botanical greenhouse in San Marino, California

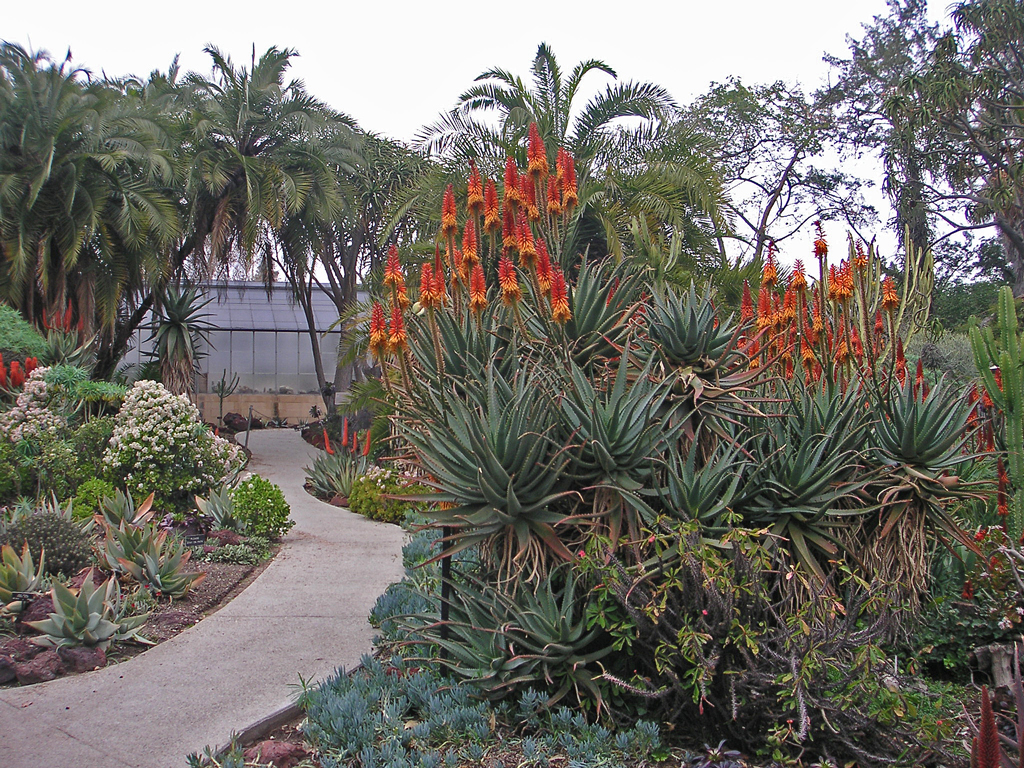
- Entrance to the Desert Garden Conservatory
- Interactive map of Desert Garden Conservatory
- Type: cactus garden
- Location: San Marino, California
- Coordinates: 34.1272°N 118.1100°W
- Created: 1985
- Open: Yes
- Website: www.huntington.org/desert-garden

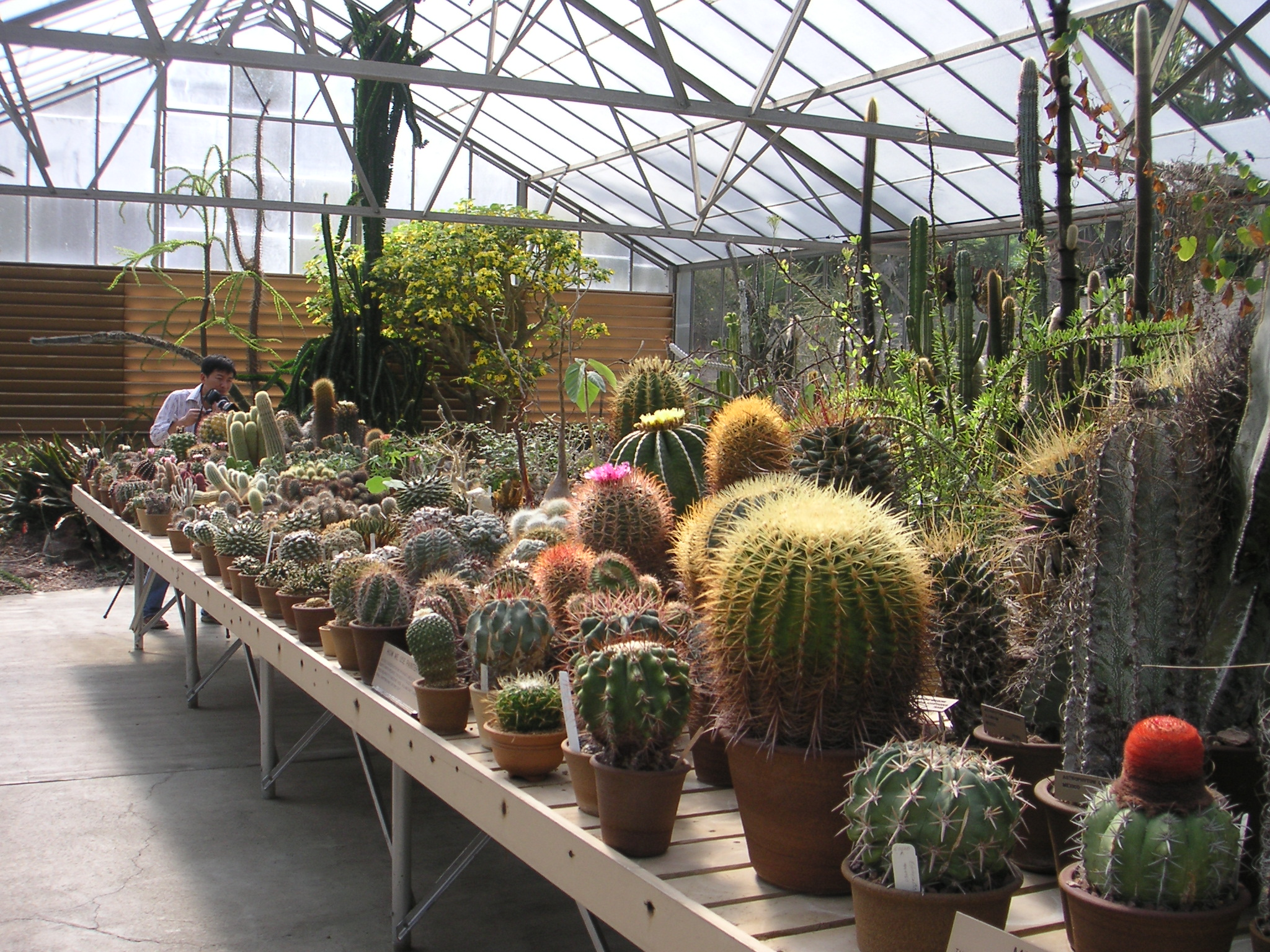
Interior View of the Desert Garden Conservatory

The Desert Garden Conservatory is a large botanical greenhouse and part of the Huntington Library, Art Collections and Botanical Gardens, in San Marino, California. It was constructed in 1985. The Desert Garden Conservatory is adjacent to the 10-acre (40,000 m^{2}) Huntington Desert Garden itself. The garden houses one of the most important collections of cacti and other succulent plants in the world, including a large number of rare and endangered species. The 3,000-square-foot (280 m^{2}) Desert Garden Conservatory serves The Huntington and public communities as a conservation facility, research resource and genetic diversity preserve. John N. Trager is the Desert Collection curator.

There are an estimated 10,000 succulents worldwide, about 1,500 of them classified as cacti. The Huntington Desert Garden Conservatory now contains more than 2,200 accessions, representing more than 43 plant families, 1,261 different species and subspecies, and 246 genera. The plant collection contains examples from the world's major desert regions, including the southern United States, Argentina, Bolivia, Chile, Brazil, Canary Islands, Madagascar, Malawi, Mexico and South Africa. The Desert Collection plays a critical role as a repository of biodiversity, in addition to serving as an outreach and education center.

== Propagation program to save rare and endangered plants ==
Some studies estimate that as many as two-thirds of the world's flora and fauna may become extinct during the course of the 21st century, the result of global warming and encroaching development. Scientists alarmed by these prospects are working diligently to propagate plants outside their natural habitats, in protected areas. Ex-situ cultivation, as this practice is known, can serve as a stopgap for plants that will otherwise be lost to the world as their habitats disappear. To this end, The Huntington has a program to protect and plant propagate endangered plant species, designated International Succulent Introductions (ISI).

The aim of the ISI program is to propagate and distribute new or rare succulents to collectors, nurseries and institutions to further research and appreciation of these remarkable plants. The ISI distributes as many as 40 new succulent varieties every year. Field-collected plants, cuttings or seeds are not sold, only seedlings, grafts and rooted cuttings produced under nursery conditions without detriment to wild populations.

== The Schick hybrids ==
The Schick hybrids are derived primarily from crosses of Harry Johnson's Paramount hybrids, created in the 1930s and 40s, and from successive crosses of their progeny. Like the Paramount hybrids, the Schick hybrids can flower several times in a season and, with increasing age, can produce greater numbers of flowers. Under the Huntington's growing conditions the first flush of flowers is typically in April with successive flushes occurring in May, June and July, and, in some hybrids, even into August, September and October. These horticultural-significant cultivars are also available through The Huntington's ISI program.

== Interior images of the Desert Garden Conservatory ==
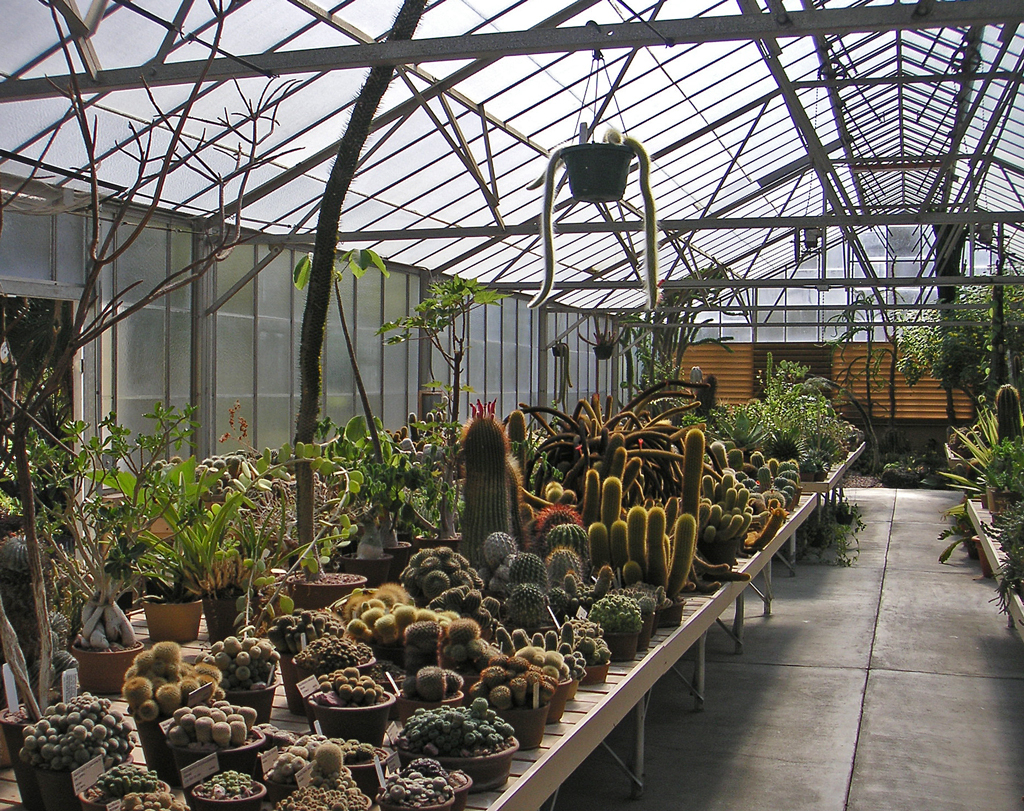
The greenhouse

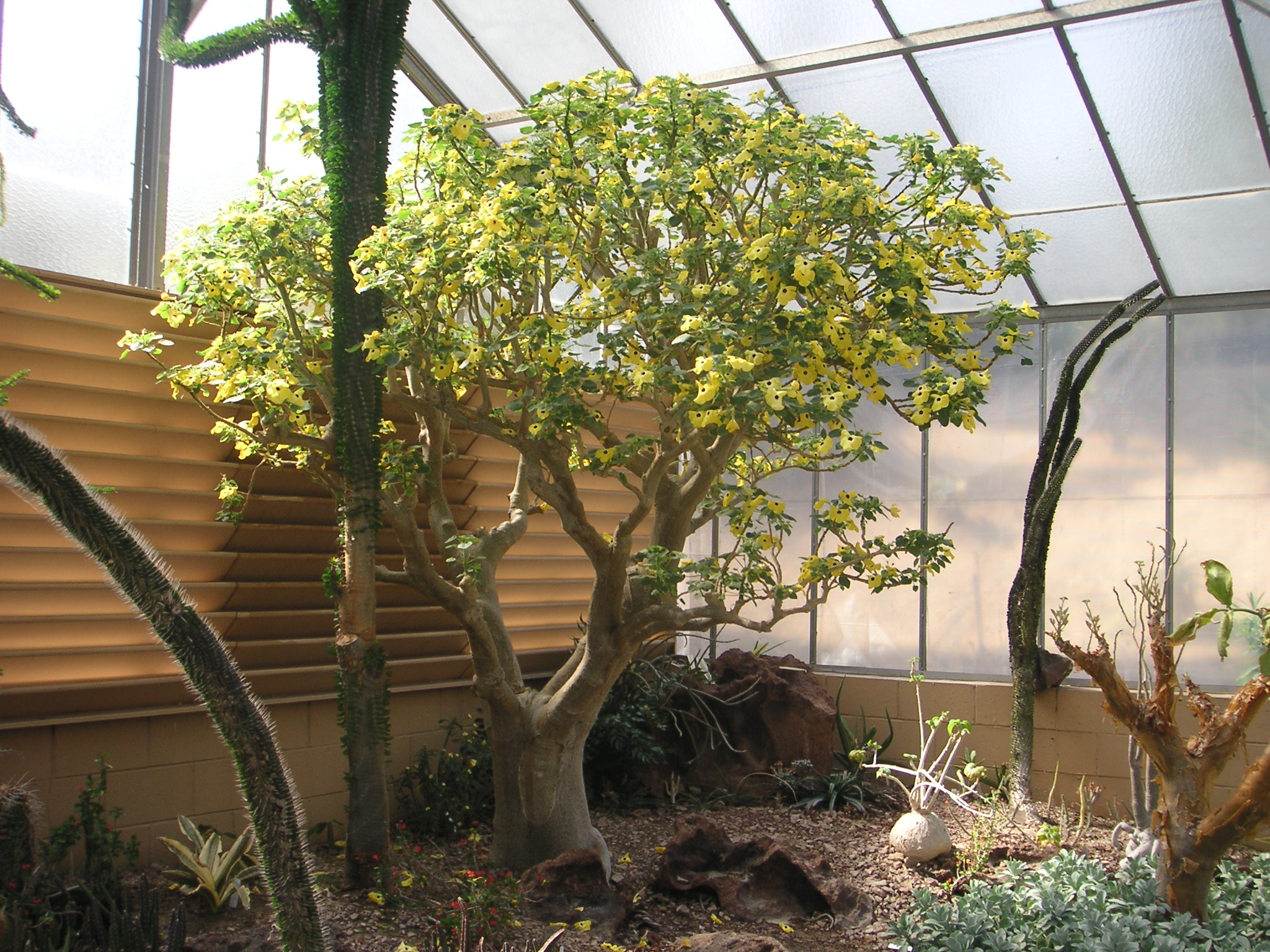
Uncaria grandidieri

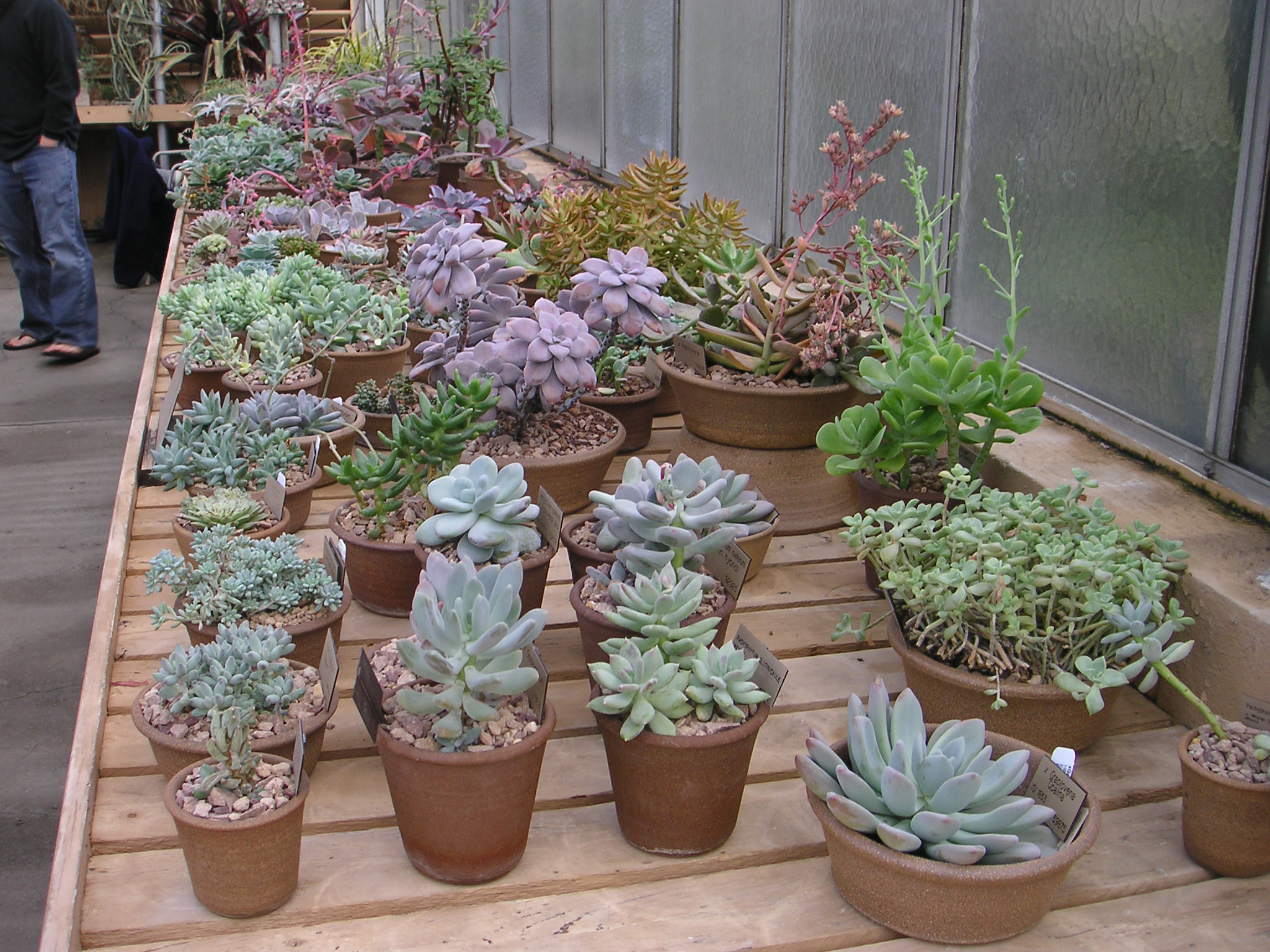
Echeverias

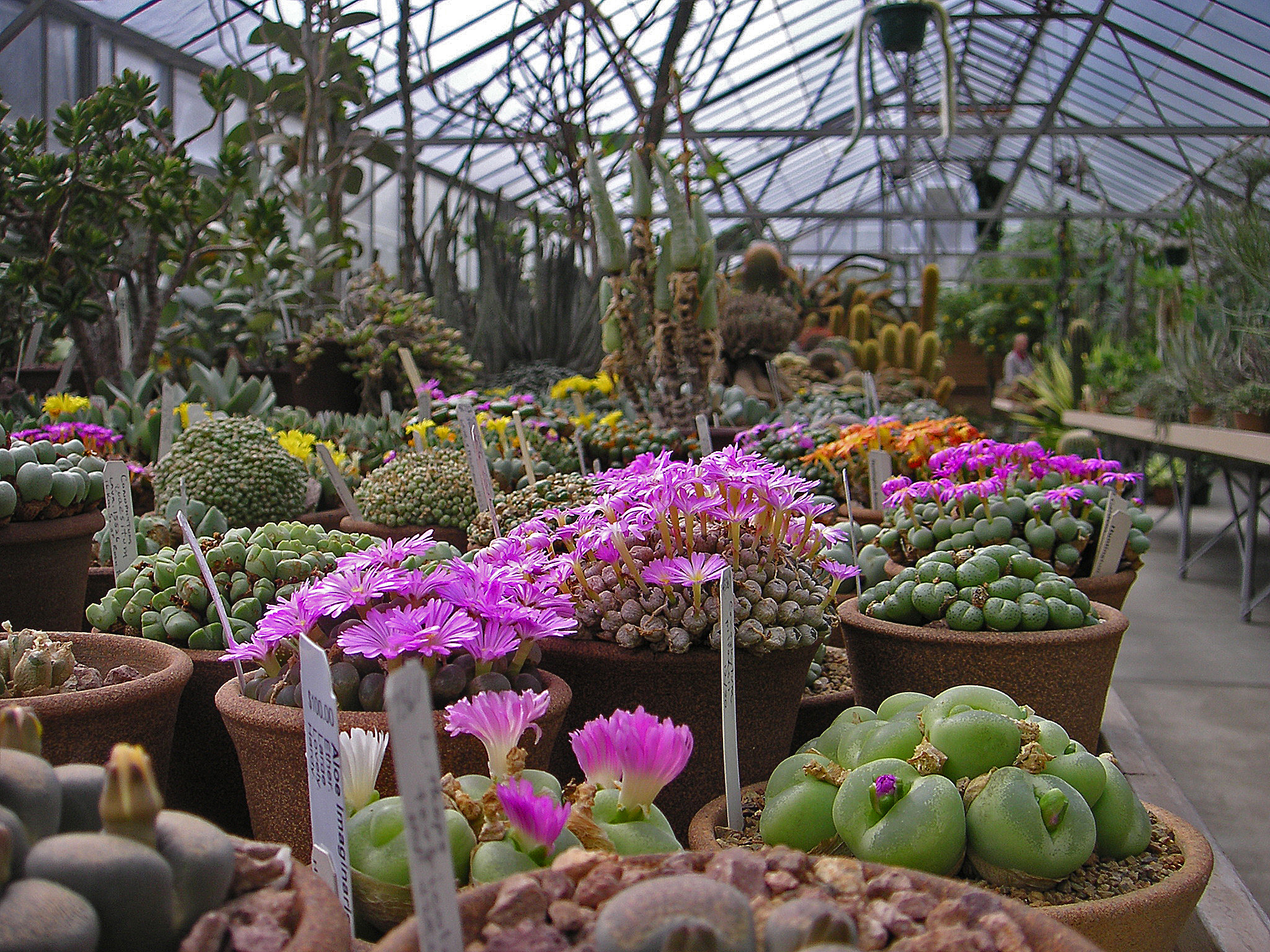
Lithops

== Plants in the Desert Garden Conservatory ==
Cactaceae

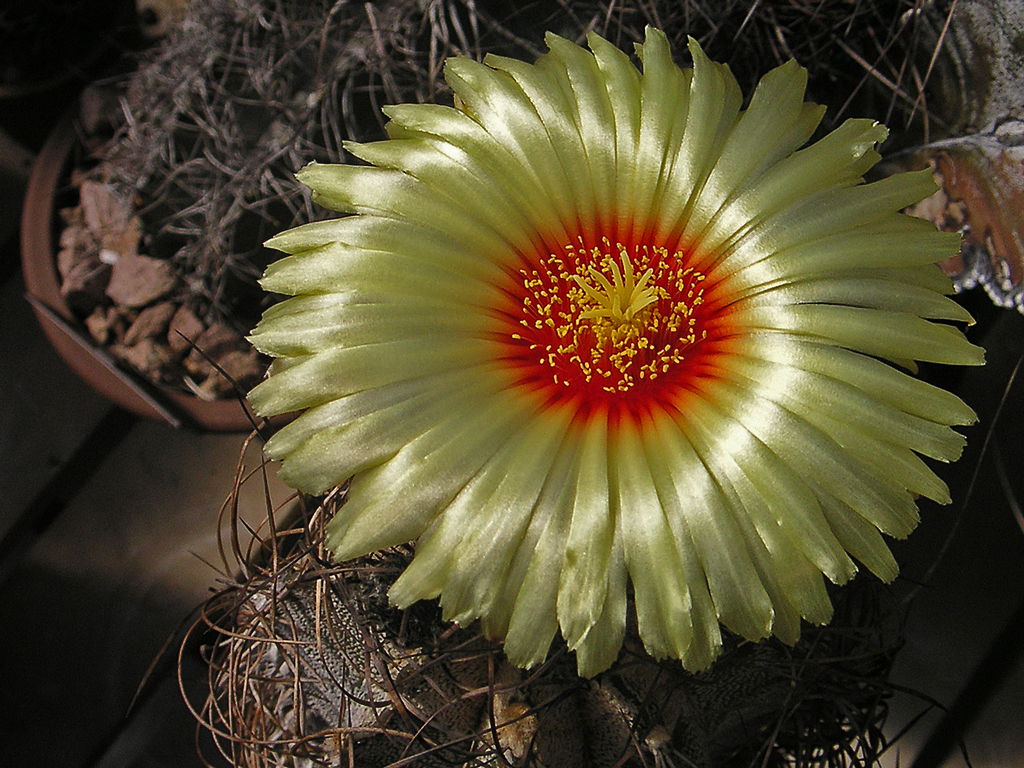
Astrophytum capricorne

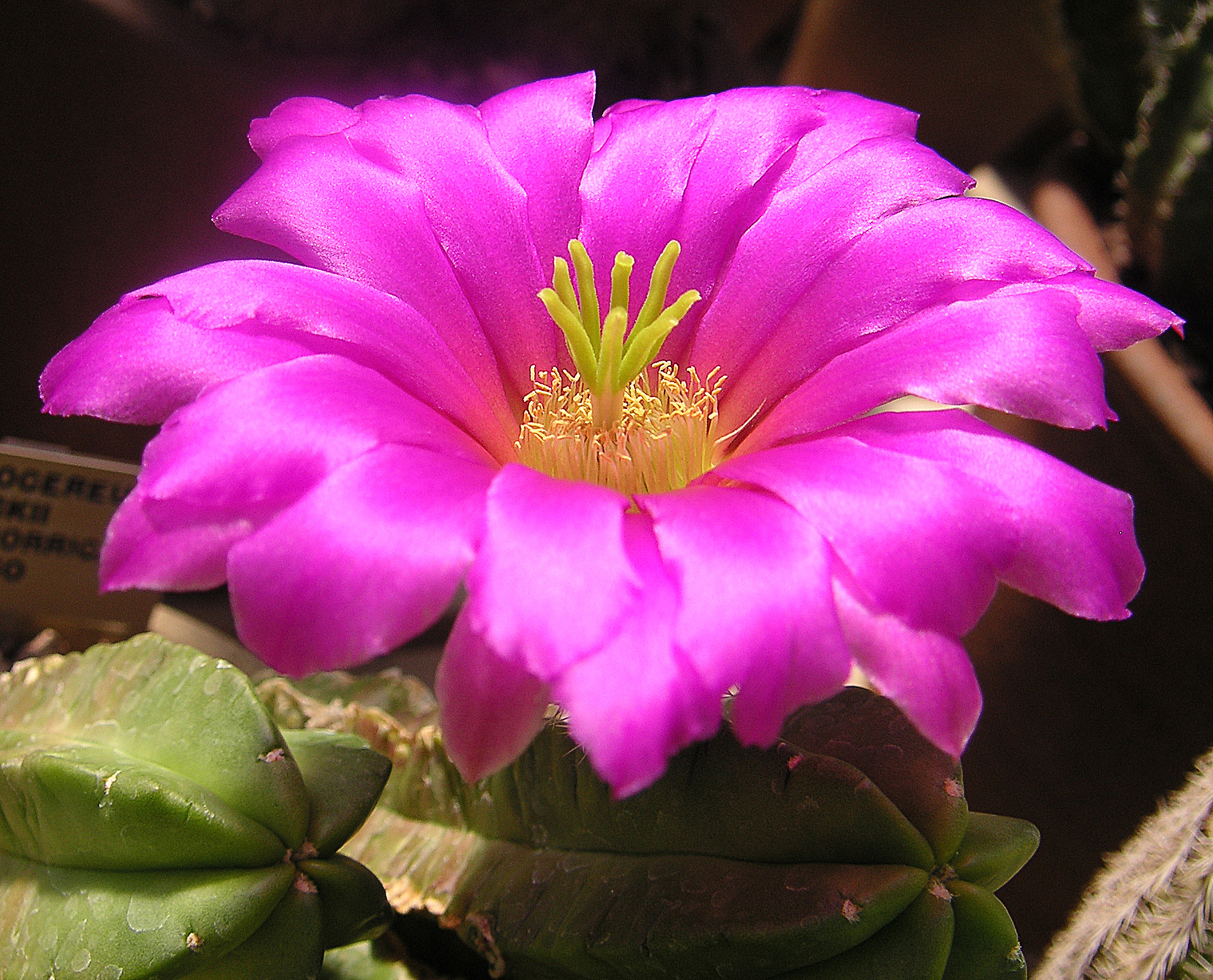
Echinocereus viereckii ssp. morricalii HBG 48099

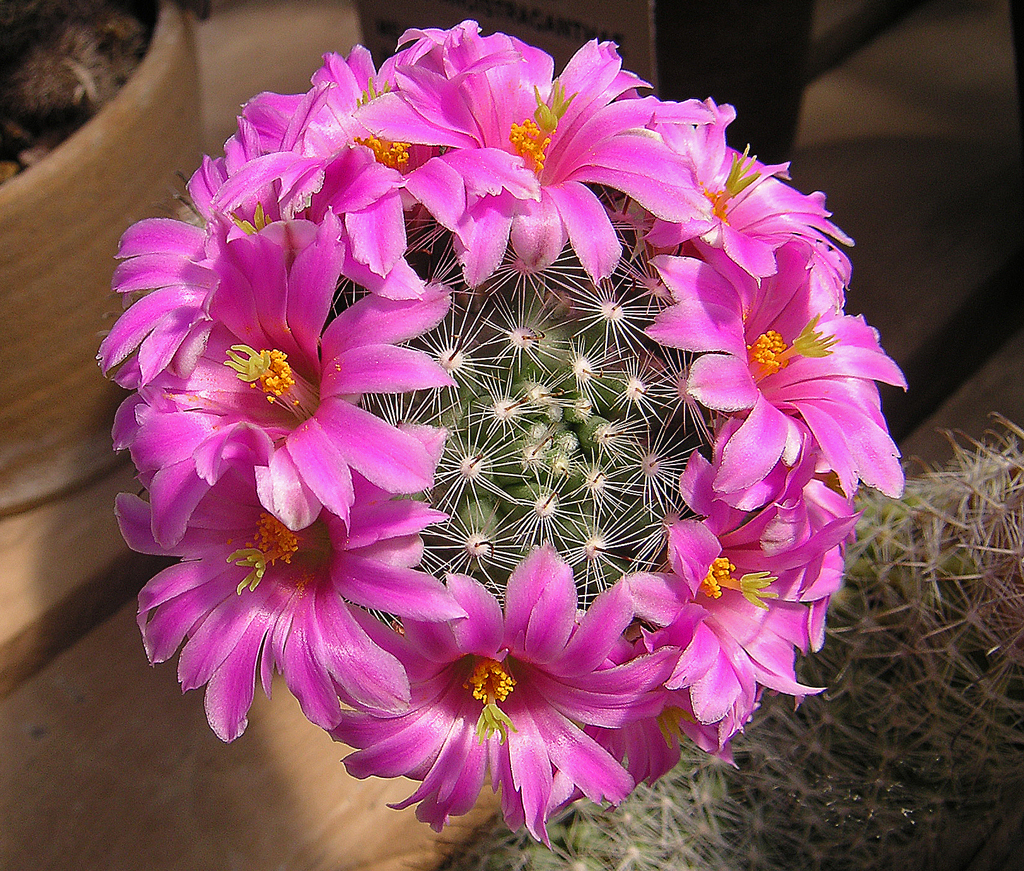
Mammillaria boolii HBG 48842

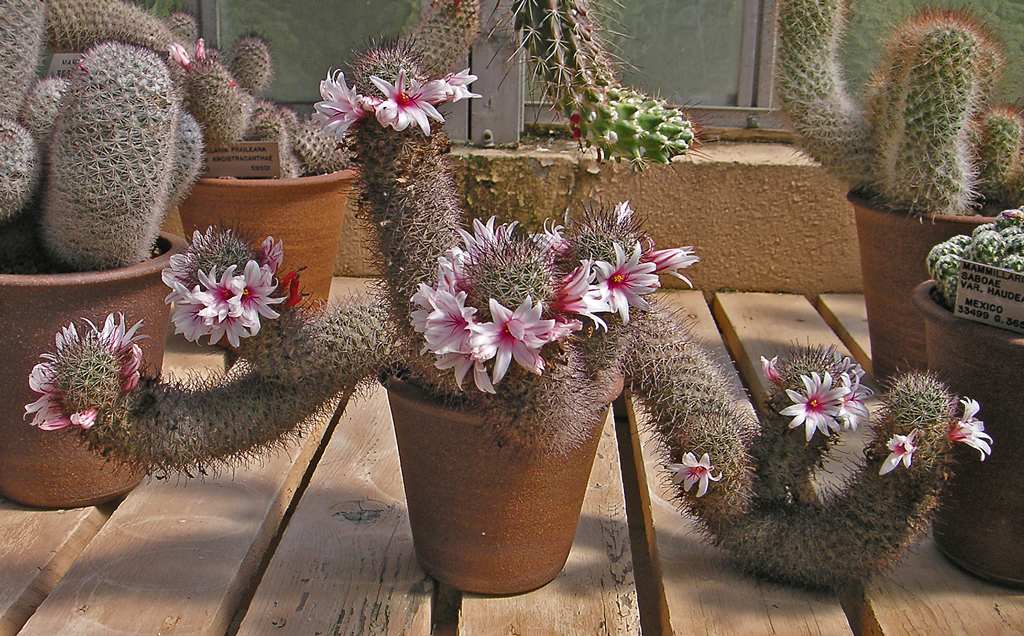
Mammillaria fraileana HBG 59973

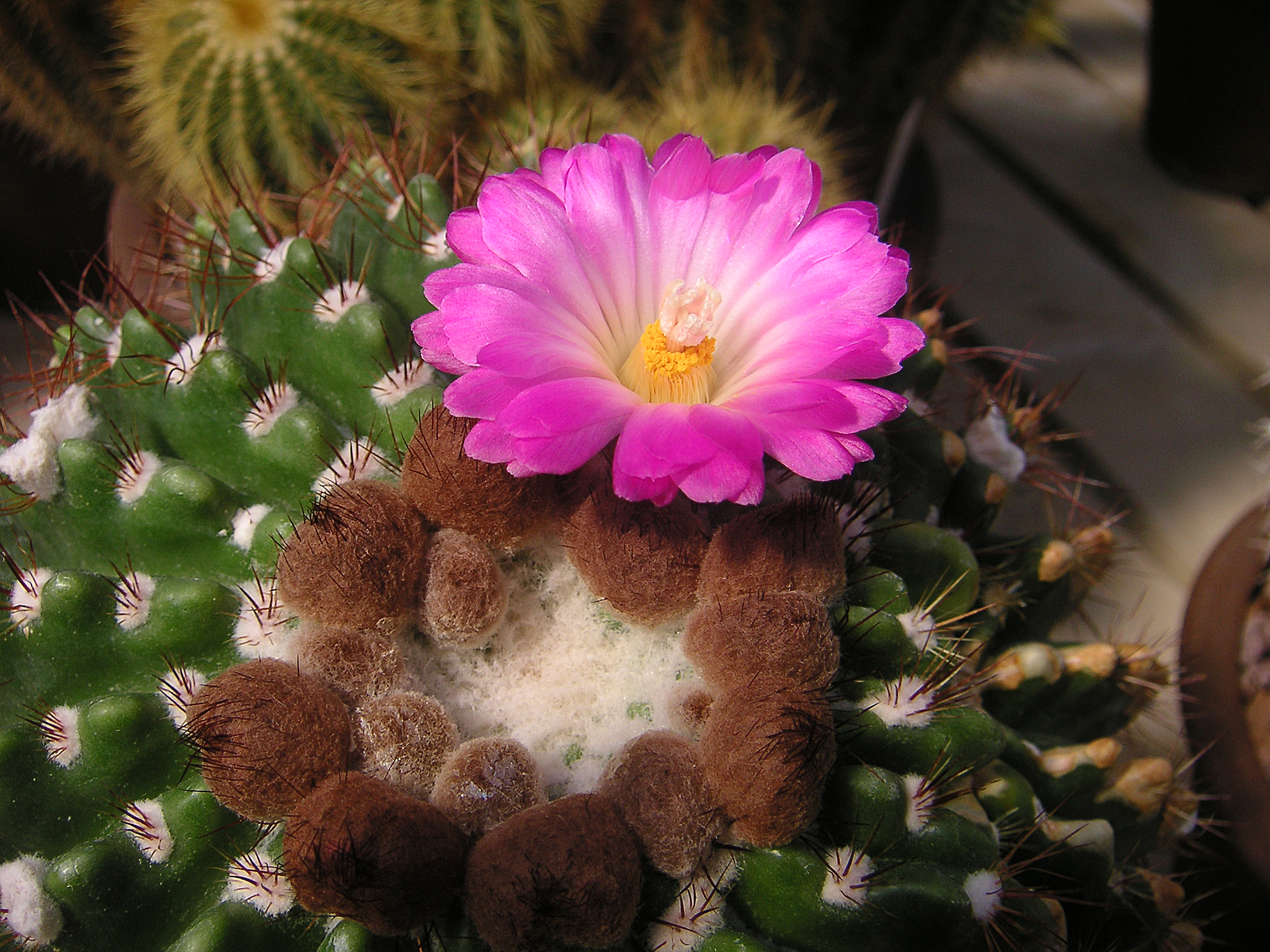
Notocactus herteri

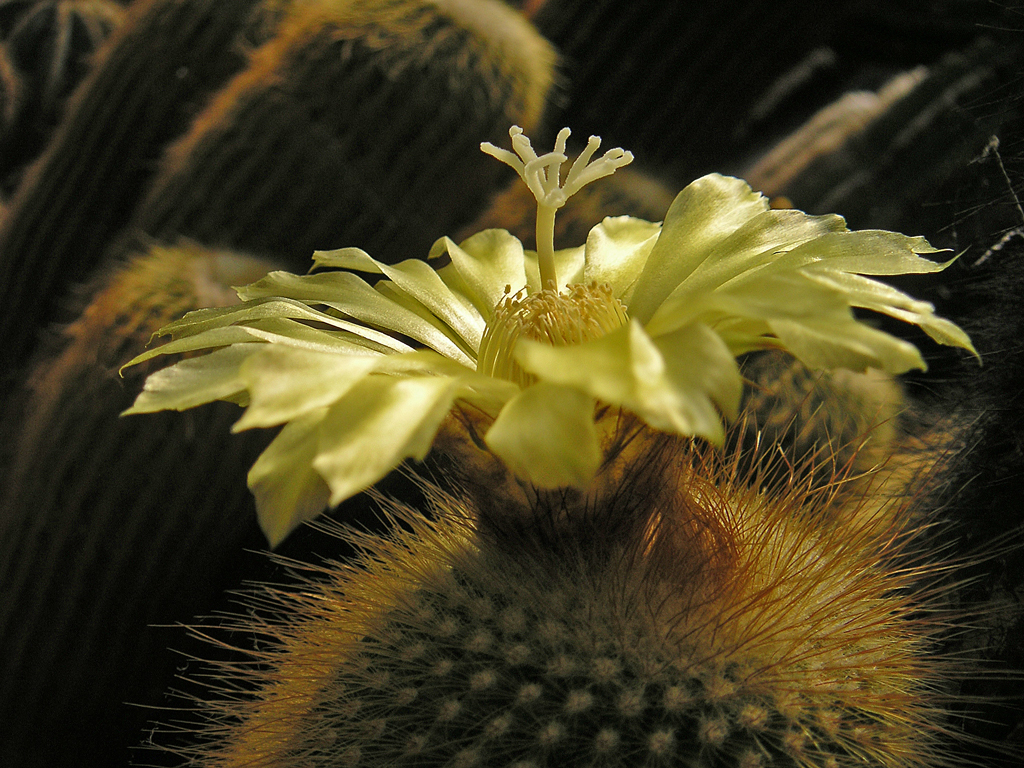
Parodia leninghausii HBG 53682

=== Other families represented ===
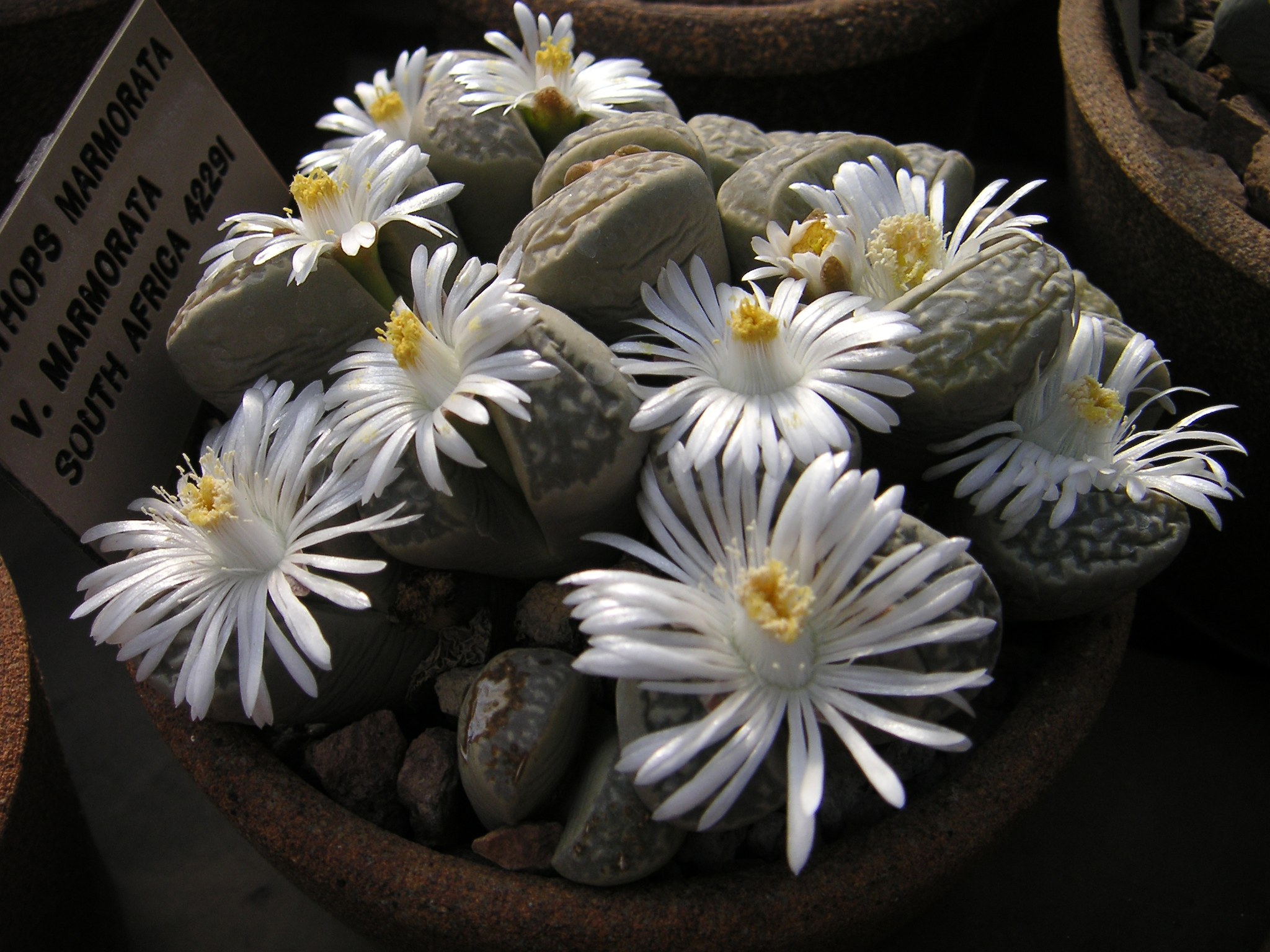
Lithops marmorata ssp. marmorata
(Aizoaceae)

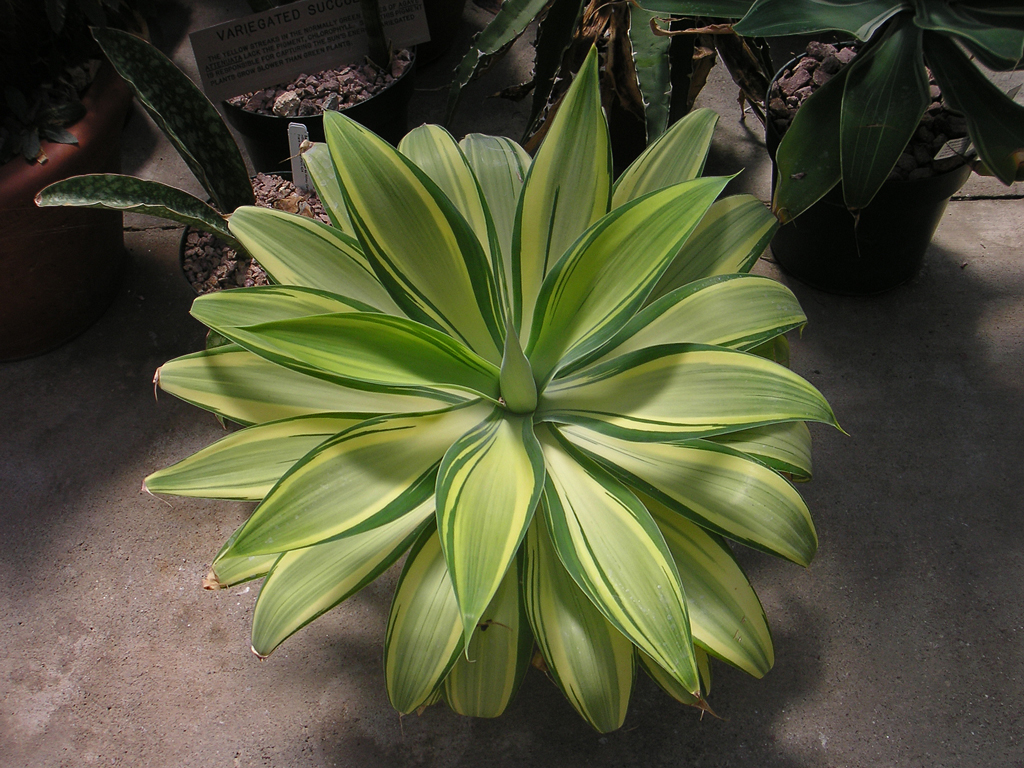
Agave attenuata "Emery Stripy"
(Agavaceae)

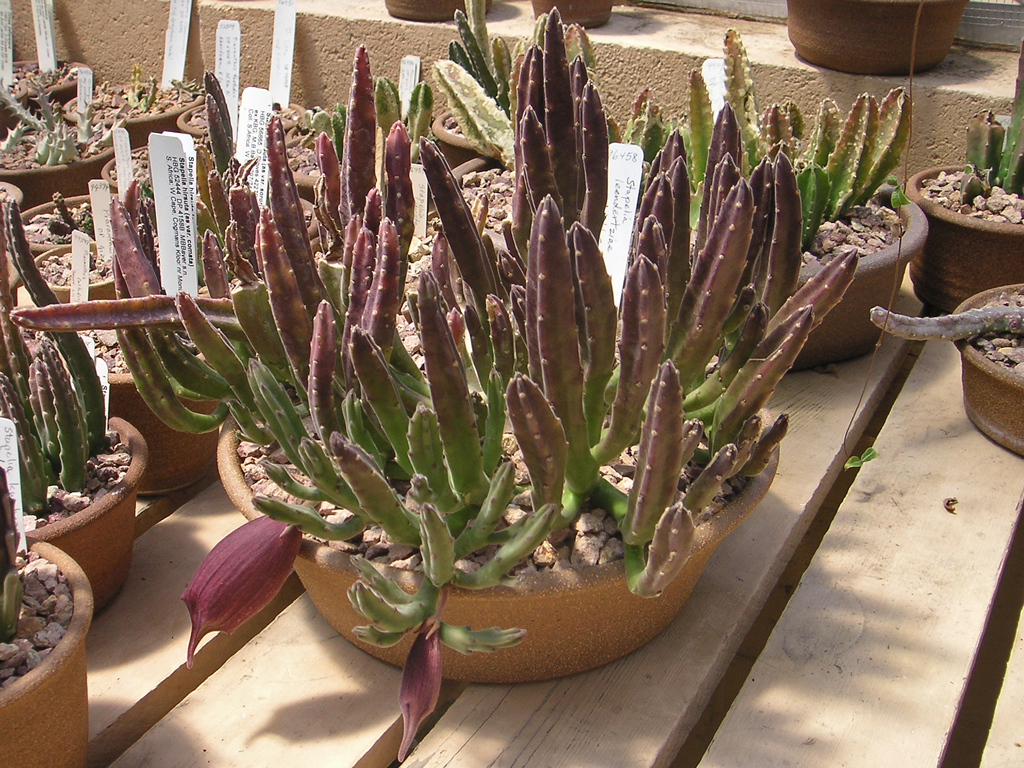
Stapelia leendertziaeex Scott Sykes
(Asclepiadaceae)

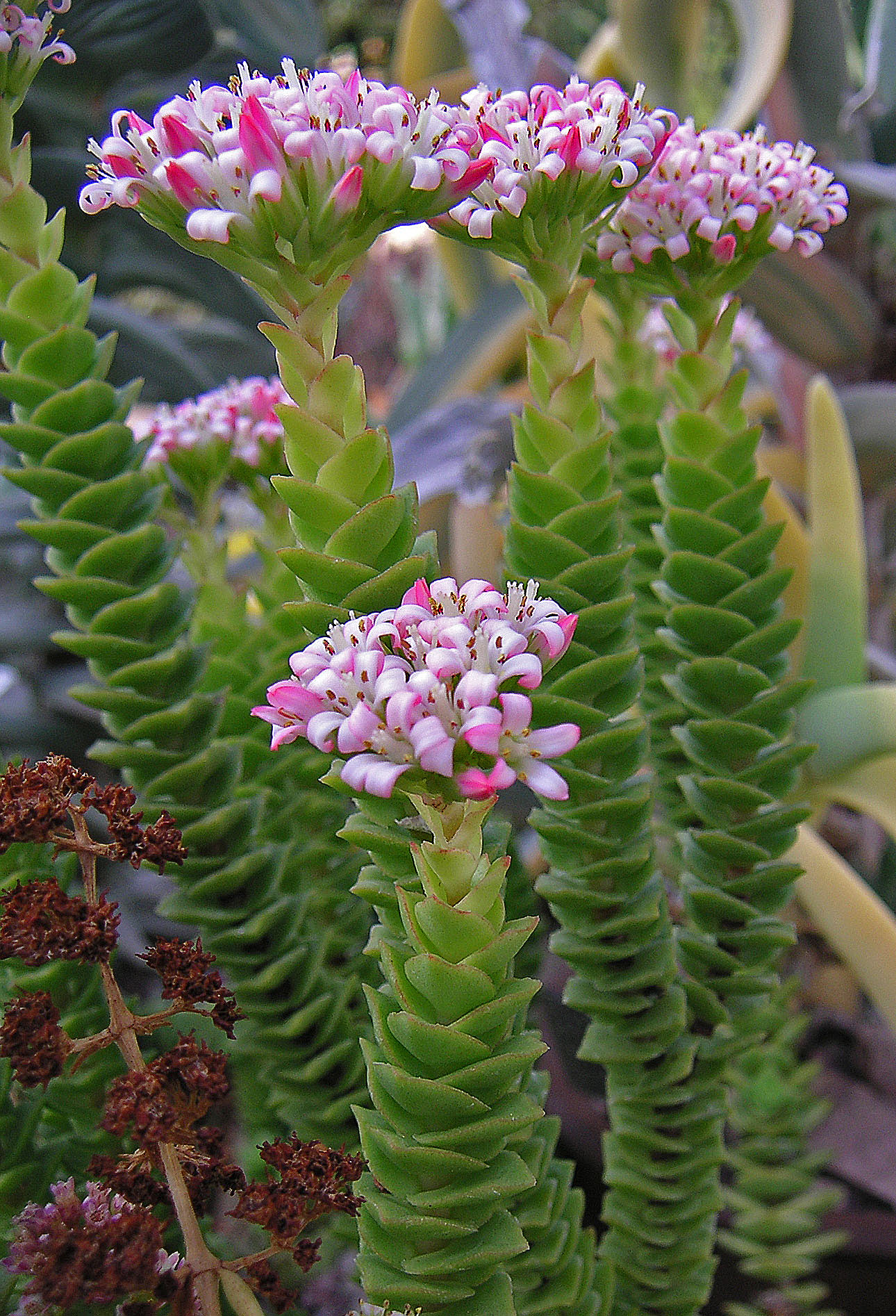
Crassulaceae "Pink-Pagoda"
(Crassulaceae)

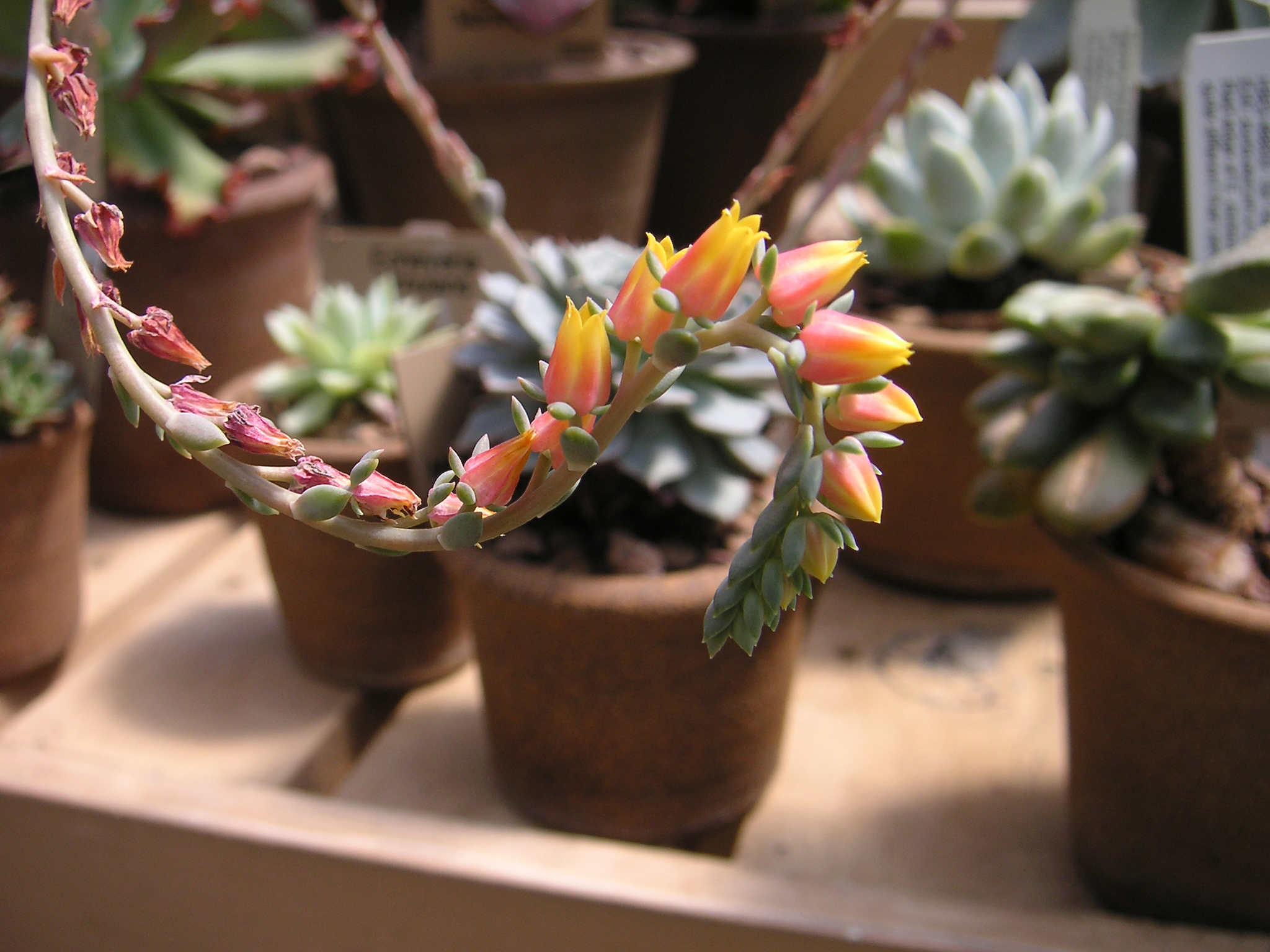
Echeveria secunda
(Crassulaceae)

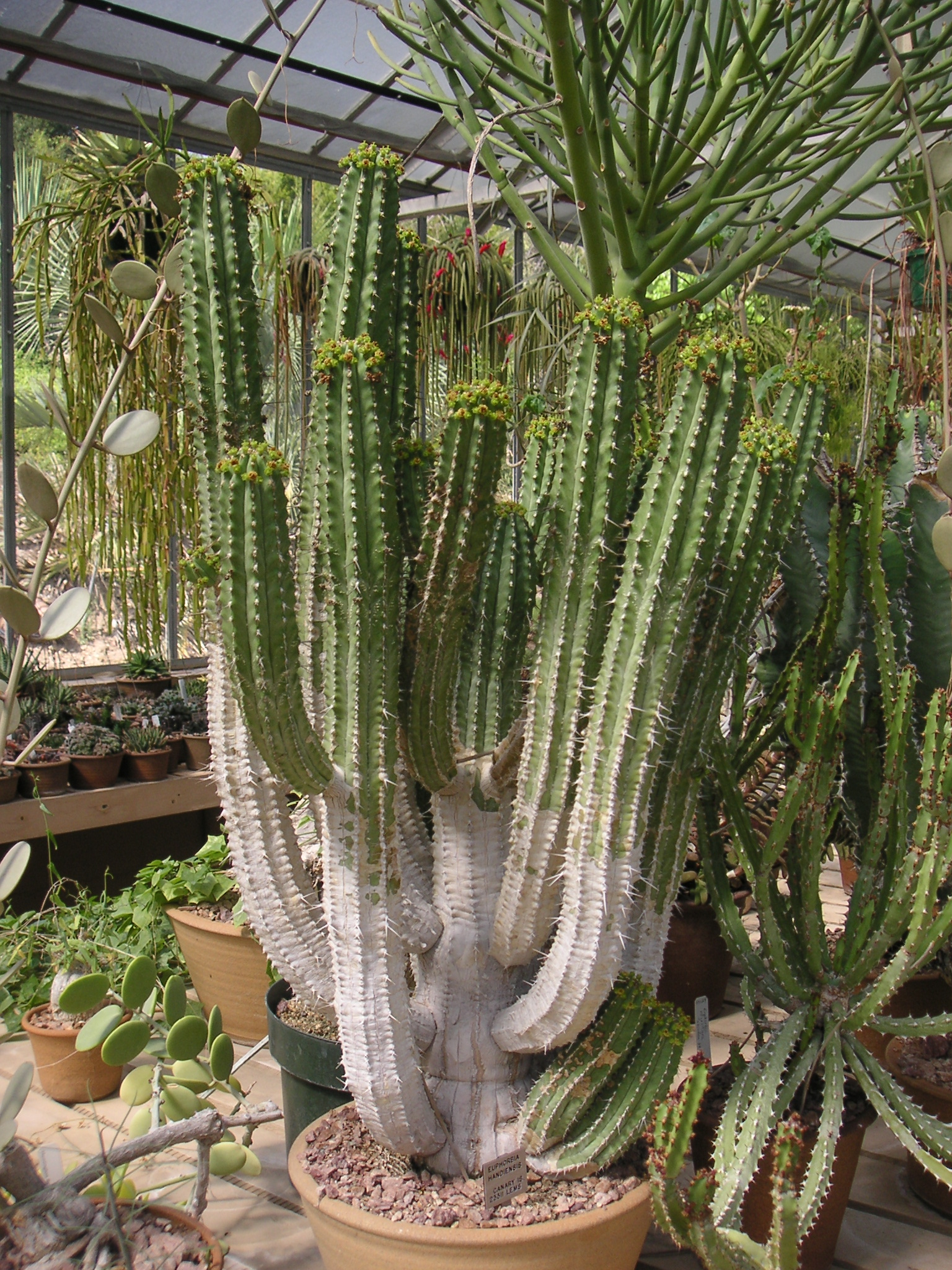
Euphorbia handiensis
(Euphorbiacea)

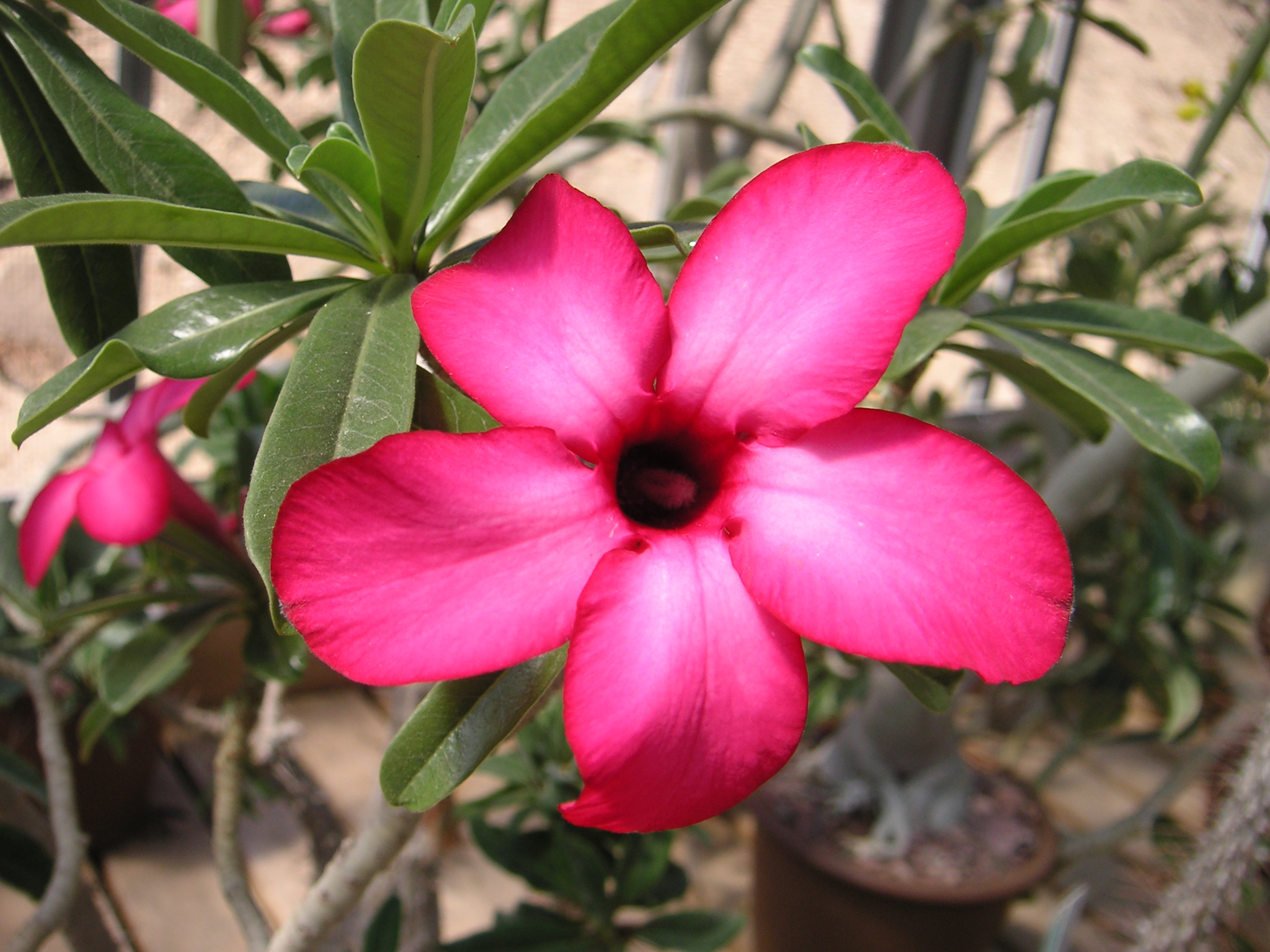
Adenium multiflorum x obesum "Mad 29"
(Apocynaceae)

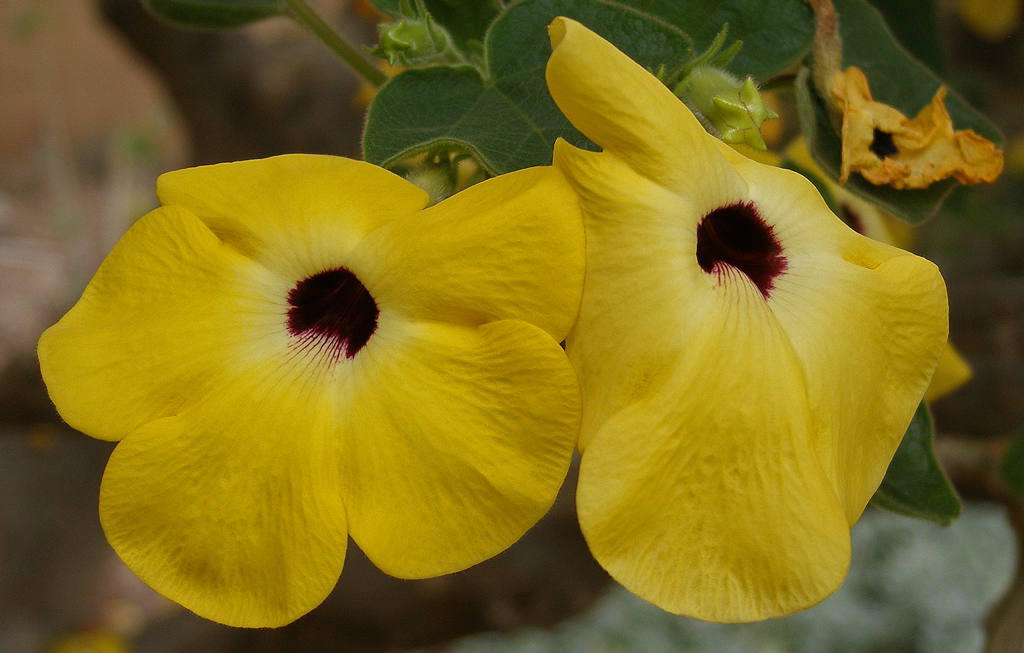
Uncarina grandidieri
(Pedaliaceae)

== See also ==
- Huntington Desert Garden
- Greenhouse
- Solar greenhouse (technical)
- Seasonal thermal energy storage (STES)
- cactus
- cacti
