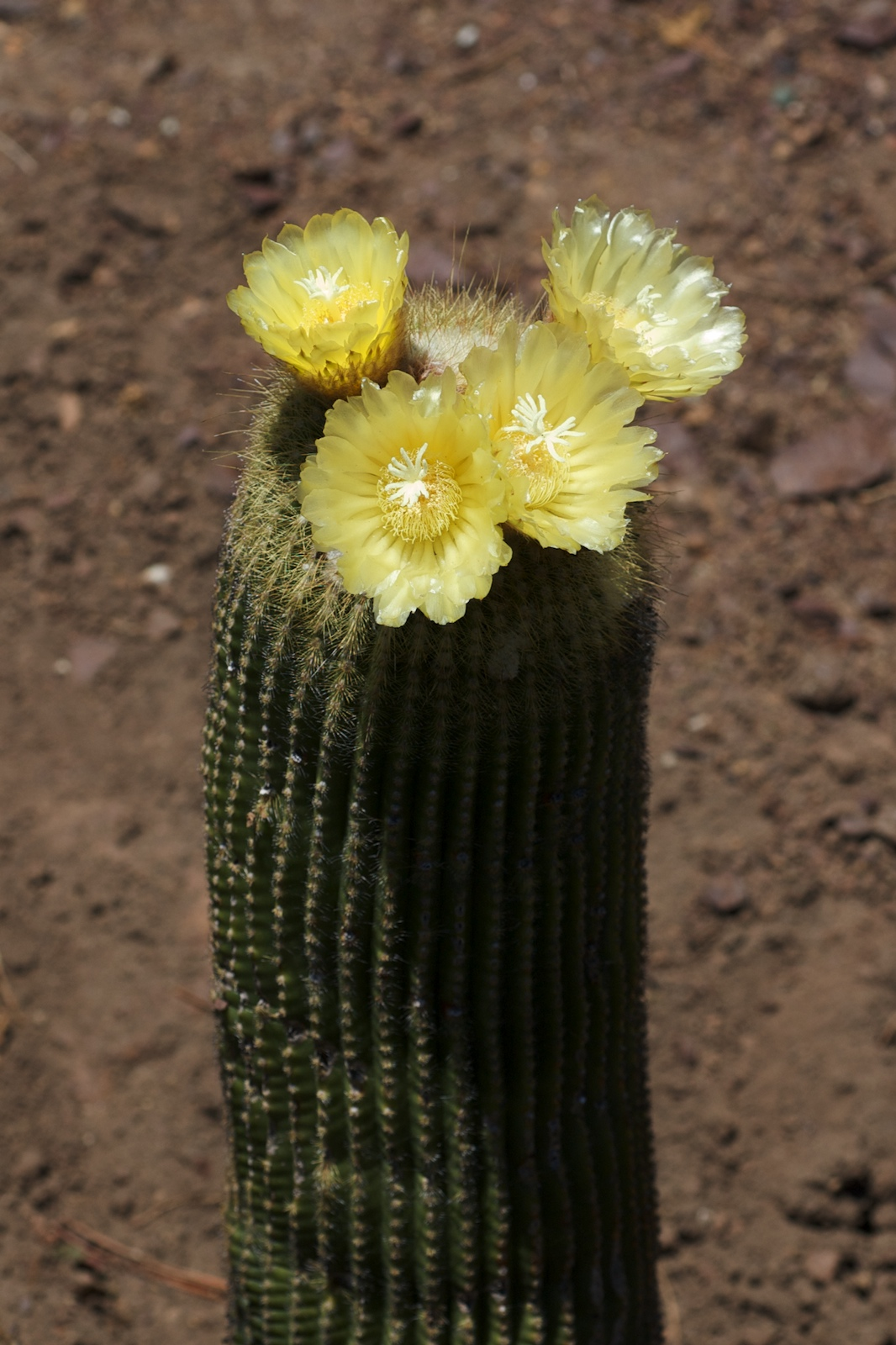

Conservation status
- Endangered (IUCN 3.1)

Scientific classification
- Kingdom: Plantae
- Clade: Tracheophytes
- Clade: Angiosperms
- Clade: Eudicots
- Order: Caryophyllales
- Family: Cactaceae
- Subfamily: Cactoideae
- Genus: Parodia
- Species: P. leninghausii

Binomial name
- Parodia leninghausii (Schumann) Brandt, 1982

Synonyms
- Notocactus leninghausii Echinocactus leninghausii Eriocephala leninghausii

= Parodia leninghausii =

Species of cactus

Parodia leninghausii is a species of South American cactus commonly found as a houseplant. Common names include lemon ball cactus, golden ball cactus and yellow tower cactus.

Botanist Karl Moritz Schumann named it after Wilhelm Lenninghaus (1845-1918), a native of North Rhine-Westphalia who, in the 1880s, left his hometown of Ennepetal and emigrated to Porto Alegre, Brazil, where he became Guillermo Lenninghaus, and collected cacti for the German grower Haage.

Parodia leninghausii is native to northeast Rio Grande do Sul in the south of Brazil. In those regions, winter nights are cold, with a light freeze. As there is ample precipitation throughout the year, this species finds its place on rocky outcrops and cliff faces.

Parodia leninghausii shows cactus species nomadism; it was successively included in genus Pilocereus K. Schumann 1895, Malacocarpus (K.Schumann) Britton & Rose 1922, Notocactus (K.Schumann) A.Berger 1929, Eriocactus (K.Schumann) Backeberg 1942, and finally ended up in Parodia (K. Schumann) F.H.Brandt 1982.

== Description ==
The species has many thin golden spines. The young plants are globular, then columnar up to 1 m (3 ft 3 in) tall, 12 cm (4.7 in) diameter and about 30 ribs. Old plants cluster from the base. Flowers are yellow, 5 cm (2.0 in) diameter, at the top of the plants, but only if adult (at least 20 cm (7.9 in) tall)

Sometimes, they present monstruous forms. There is a cultivar albispina with white spines.

== Cultivation ==
Like most cacti, Parodia leninghausii needs well drained soil, sunny exposure, regular watering in summer and no watering in winter. In temperate climates, it may be placed outside in a warm sunny position during the summer months. In winter the plant tolerates frost at −4 °C (25 °F) if kept totally dry. In cultivation, it is preferable to keep a cold temperature, but more than 2 °C (36 °F).

This plant has won the Royal Horticultural Society's Award of Garden Merit.

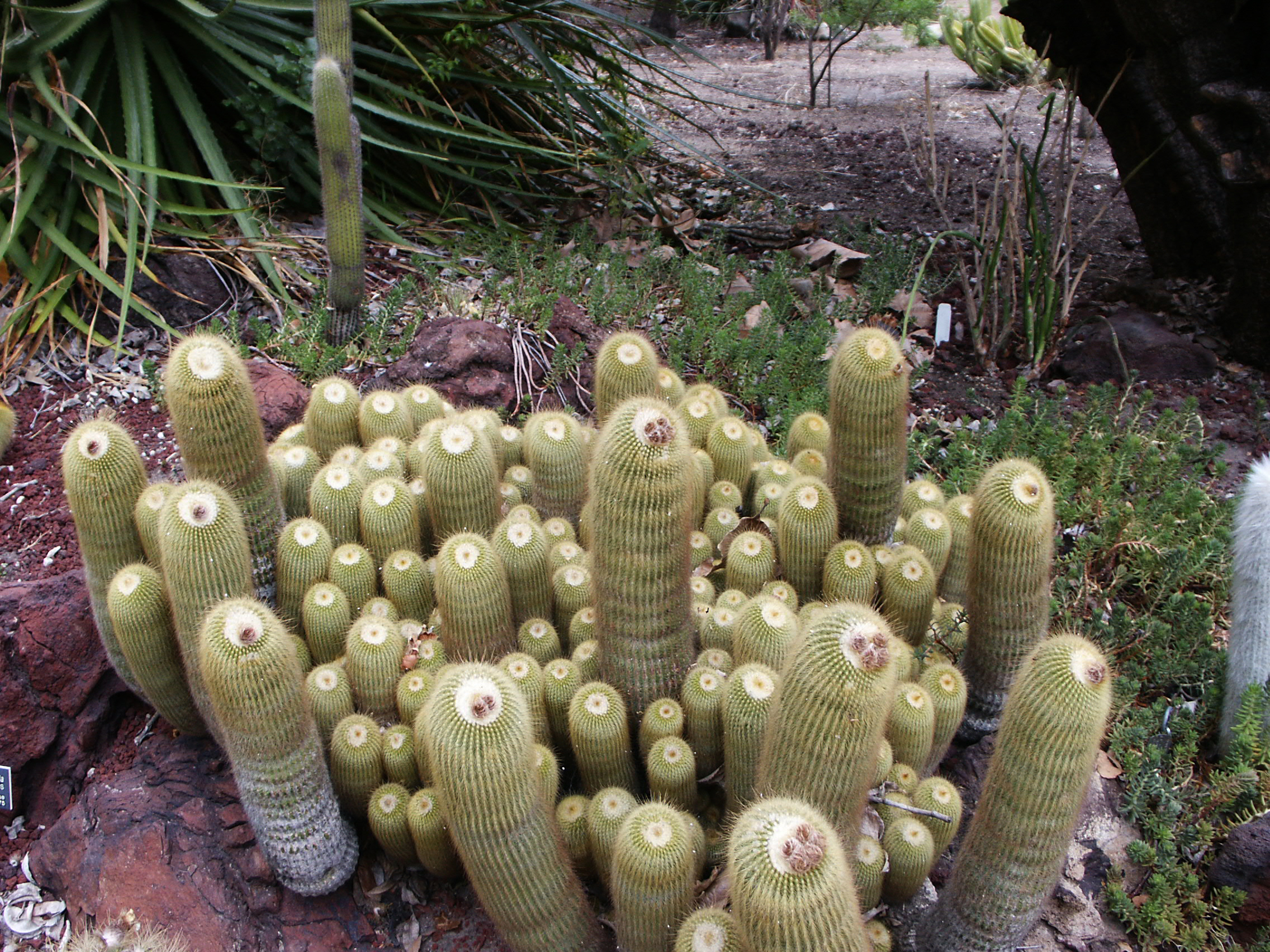
Lemon ball cluster, Huntington Desert Garden

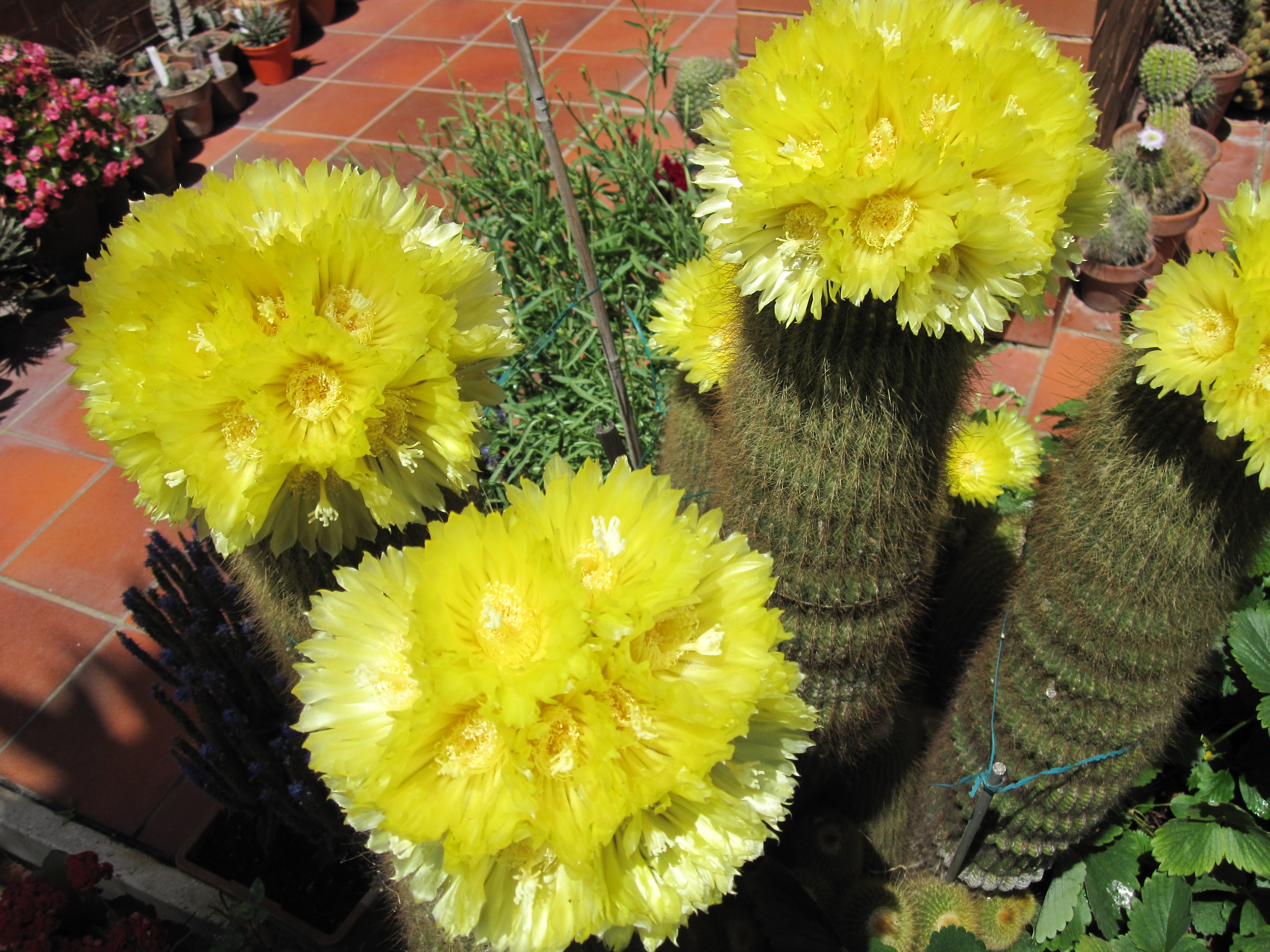
Flowers

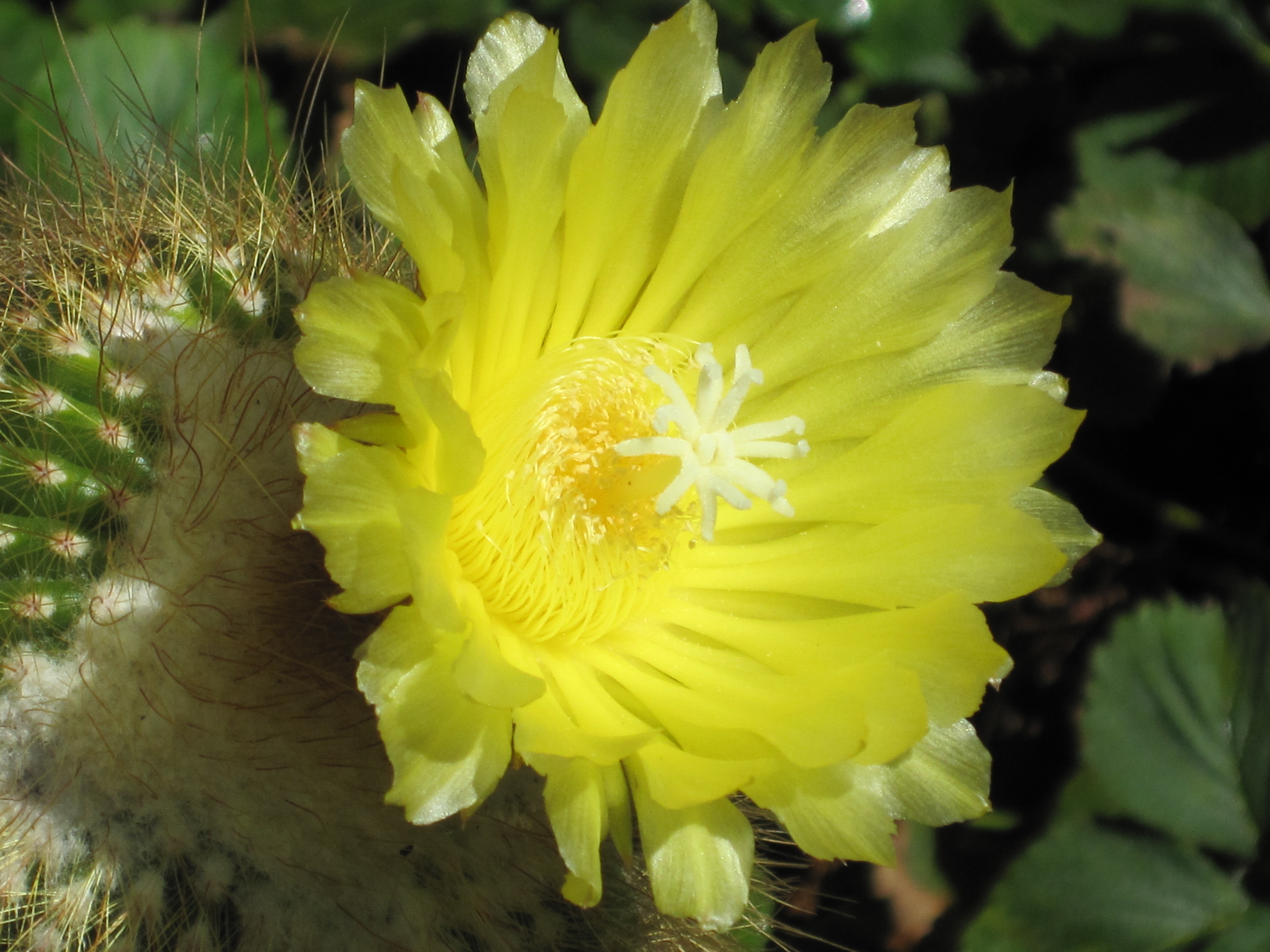
The flower of Parodia leninghausii

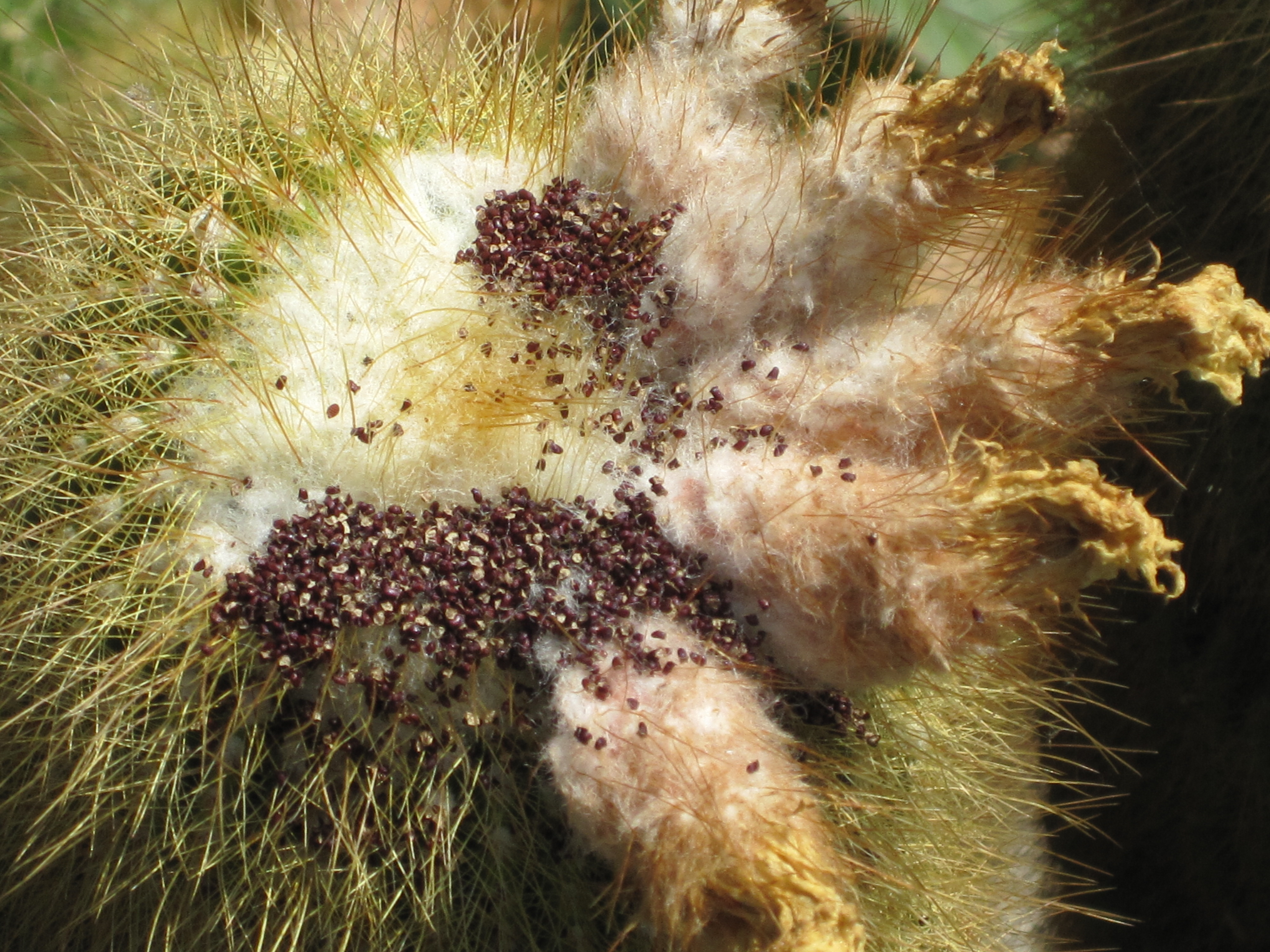
The seeds of Parodia leninghausii

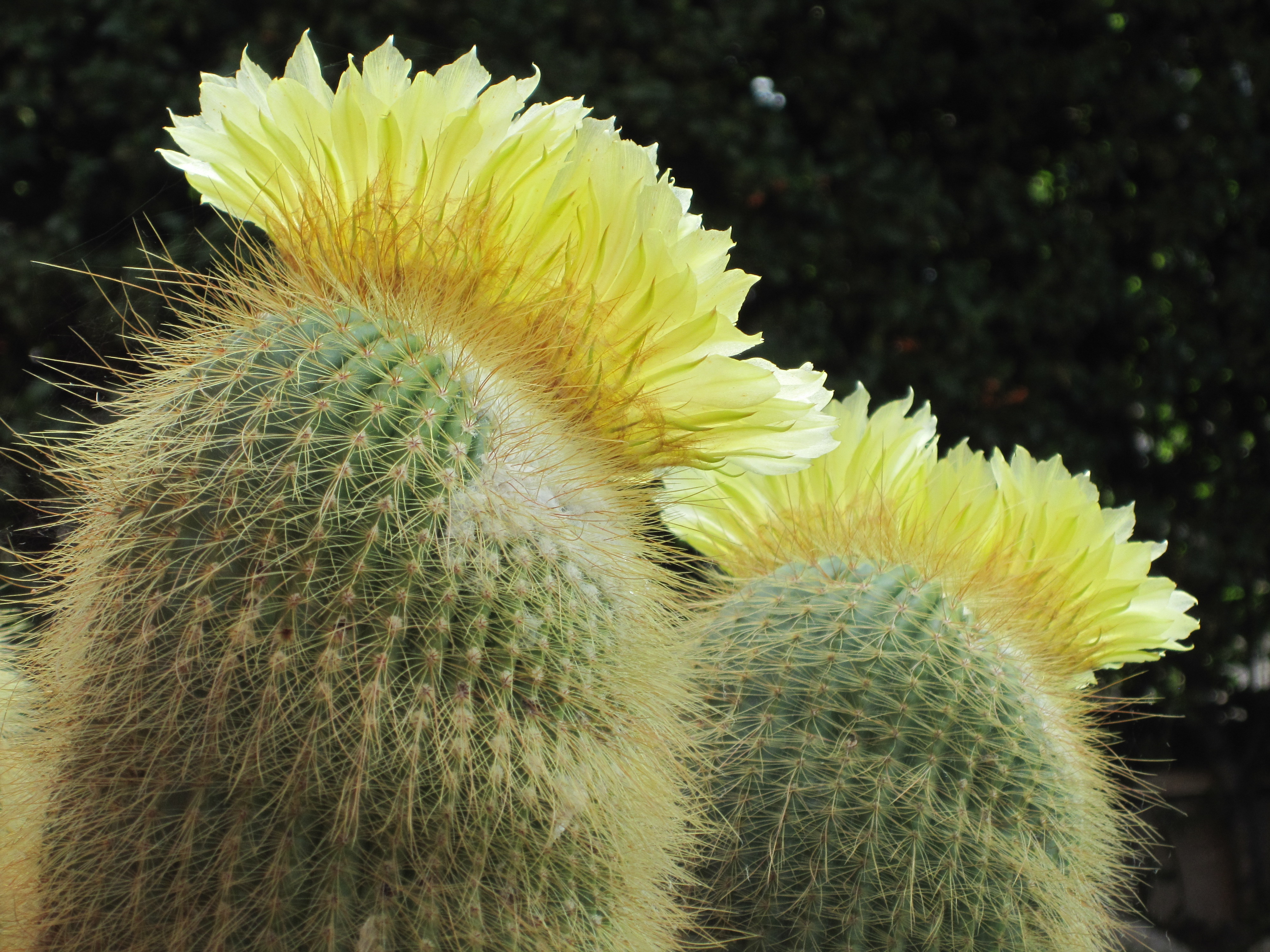
The autumnal flowering of Parodia leninghausii in Rome

== Sources ==
- Anderson, Edward F. (2001). The Cactus Family. Portland, Oregon: Timber Press. pp. 544–545. ISBN 0-88192-498-9.
