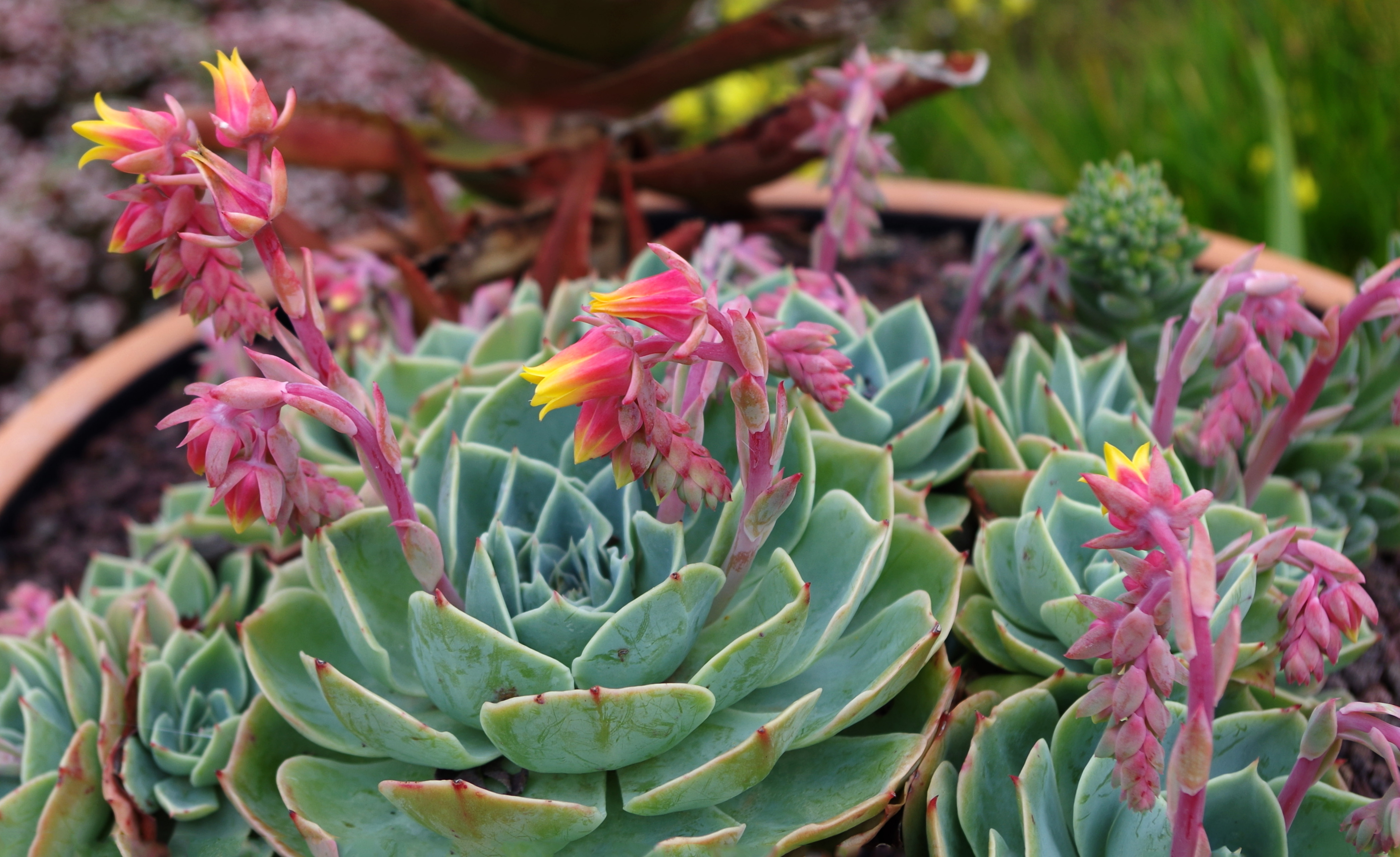
- In bloom

Scientific classification
- Kingdom: Plantae
- Clade: Embryophytes
- Clade: Tracheophytes
- Clade: Angiosperms
- Clade: Eudicots
- Order: Saxifragales
- Family: Crassulaceae
- Genus: Echeveria
- Species: E. secunda

Binomial name
- Echeveria secunda Booth ex Lindl.

Synonyms
- List: Cotyledon glauca Baker; Cotyledon pumila (Van Houtte) Baker; Cotyledon secunda (Booth ex Lindl.) Baker; Echeveria byrnesii Rose; Echeveria glauca (Baker) É.Morren; Echeveria glauca var. pumila (Van Houtte) Poelln.; Echeveria gracillima Muehlenpf. ex Ed.Otto; Echeveria pumila Van Houtte; Echeveria pumila var. glauca (Baker) E.Walther; Echeveria rosacea Linden & André; Echeveria secunda f. byrnesii (Rose) Kimnach; Echeveria secunda var. byrnesii (Rose) Poelln.; Echeveria secunda var. glauca (Baker) Ed.Otto

= Echeveria secunda =

Species of flowering plant

Echeveria secunda, called the glaucous echeveria, is a species of succulent flowering plant in the genus Echeveria, native to Mexico, and introduced to the Dominican Republic, New Zealand, and Vietnam. Its cultivar 'Compton Carousel' has gained the Royal Horticultural Society's Award of Garden Merit.
