= Huntington Desert Garden =

American botanical garden

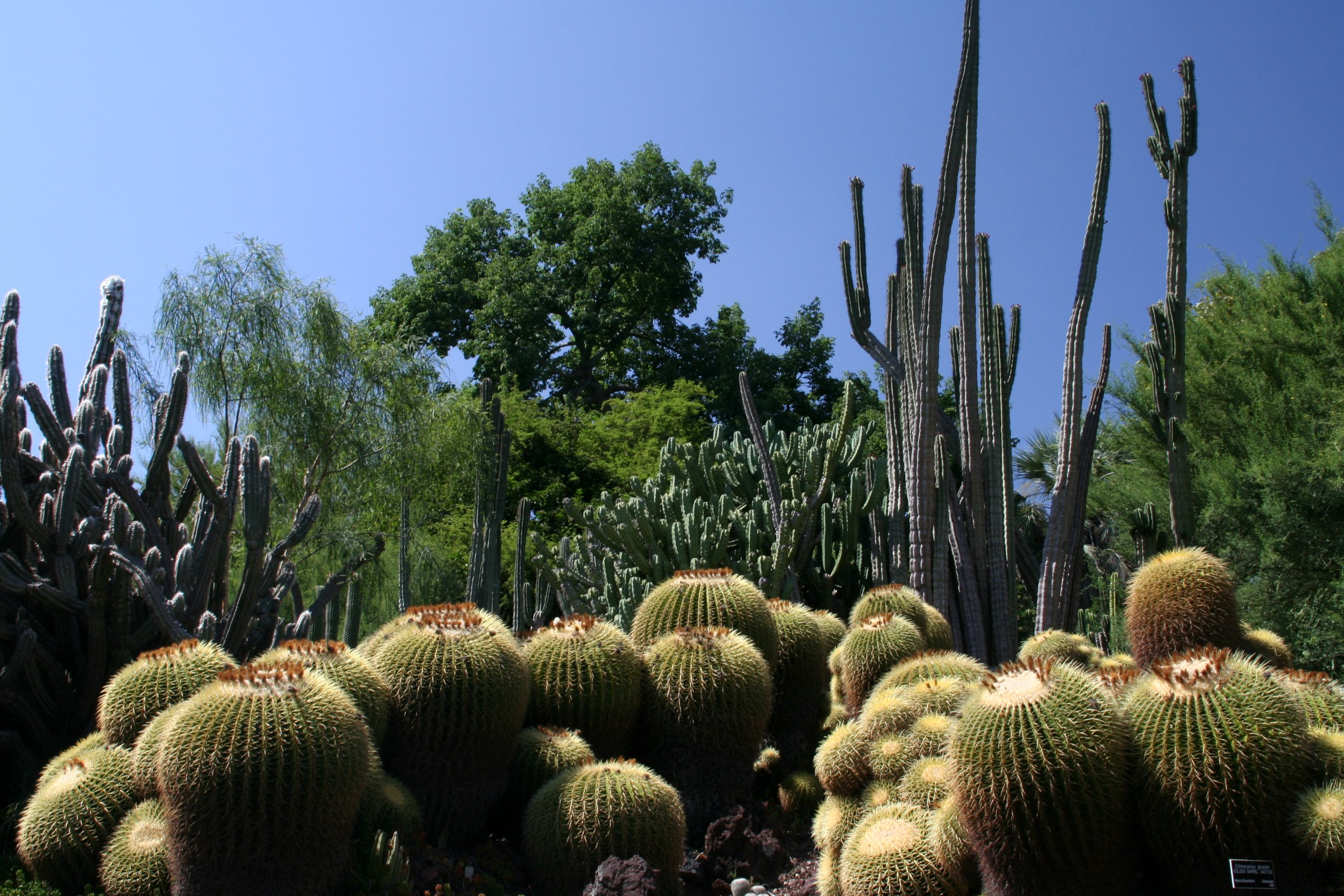
- Mature Golden Barrel cacti with columnar ceroid cacti from South America

- Location within California Location within the United States
- Type: Public
- Location: San Marino, California
- Nearest city: San Marino, California
- Coordinates: 34°07′38″N 118°06′36″W
- Area: 10 acres (4.0 ha)
- Created: 1900s
- Status: Open year round
- Website: www.huntington.org/desert-garden

The Huntington Desert Garden is part of The Huntington Library, Art Collections and Botanical Gardens in San Marino, California. The Desert Garden is one of the world's largest and oldest collections of cacti, succulents and other desert plants, collected from throughout the world. It contains plants from extreme environments, many of which were acquired by Henry E. Huntington and William Hertrich (the garden's first curator) in trips taken to several countries in North, Central and South America.

== History ==
One of the Huntington Library's most botanically important gardens, the Desert Garden brought together a group of plants that were largely unknown and unappreciated in the early 1900s. Featuring a broad category of xerophytes (aridity-adapted plants), the Desert Garden grew to preeminence and remains today among the world's finest, with more than 5,000 species in the 10 acre (4 ha) garden.

Huntington was not initially interested in establishing a Desert Garden because he did not like cacti at all, owing to some unfortunate prickly pear encounters during railroad construction work. But Hertrich was persistent, and, once won over, Huntington built a railway spur to his garden in order to bring in rock, soil and plants by the carload. As Gary Lyons, a later curator, remarked, "...it's very convenient to have a rail spur, and deep pockets, when you're building a big garden". A visit to Arizona in 1908 filled three railroad cars for the trip back to the garden.

Famed Brazilian landscape architect Roberto Burle Marx called the Huntington Desert Garden "the most extraordinary garden in the world."

== Desert Garden collections ==
Also see: Desert Garden Conservatory

The most significant collections are agave and related genera (Agavaceae), aloe (Aloaceae), terrestrial bromeliads (Bromeliaceae), cacti (Cactaceae), echeveria, crassula, sedum and related genera of succulents (Crassulaceae), euphorbia (Euphorbiaceae), and fouquieria (Fouquieriaceae), as well as nontaxonomic caudiciforms.

The Desert Garden agave and yucca collections, along with the cacti, are among the Huntington's most significant research collections. Huntington boasts the largest Yucca filifera in the world. The Huntington's Beaucarnea, Ponytail "Palms", members of the agave family (not true palms), are some of the oldest specimens in cultivation, and among the earliest plantings in the Desert Garden.

"Aloes" (Aloae) constitute one of the largest collections outside Africa. Aloe arborescens has an unrivalled winter display of fiery red flower stalks. About 200 of the world's 300 species of aloes reside in the upper garden. Most are from southern Africa. Aloidendron barberae (syn. Aloe bainesii), which can grow fifty feet high, is the tallest.

Puyas are terrestrial bromeliads (Bromeliaceae) that put on a spectacular floral display in April and early May.

Most desert columnar plants belong to the genus Cereus. They form the structure of much of the Desert Garden landscape, producing flowers in late summer and colorful fruit in September and October. Cereus xanthocarpus, at twenty tons, is the garden's most massive plant. This tree-like cactus was already a mature specimen when planted in 1905. It is approximately 125 years old.

Additionally, Huntington Garden contains over 500 bright yellow-spined Golden Barrel Cactus (Echinocactus grusonii), one of the largest displays of Golden Barrels in the world. They flower in the Spring, and are native to central Mexico. The largest golden barrel cactus in the garden is more than 85 years old.

The crassula family consists of unarmed leaf succulents found mostly in Mexico and Africa. Cool autumn brings out pastel leaf colors in aeonium, echeveria, kalanchoe, pachyphytum, and sedum.

The columnar cactus-like plants in the African section of the Desert Garden are succulent spurges (Euphorbia) and have caustic milky latex. Most species in the garden are native to South Africa and East Africa. Crown of Thorns (Euphorbia milii), the familiar house plant, is a spiny native of Madagascar that produces colorful bracts throughout the year.

The strange-looking boojum trees (Fouquieria columnaris) native to Baja California, are rare oddities in the Fouquieriaceae. The better-known ocotillo (F. splendens) is in the California bed. The central garden is landscaped with numerous fouquierias from Mexico with bright red blossoms most of the year.

The garden has the largest collection of living stones in America, small southern African plants of the genus Lithops.

The collection of caudiciform plants is equally significant. These plants produce very thick stems that can look like twisted sweet potatoes. The stem serves as a water storage structure known as a caudex. The garden boasts an enormous specimen of Dioscorea elephantipes.

Source: unless cited separately.

== Desert Garden gallery ==
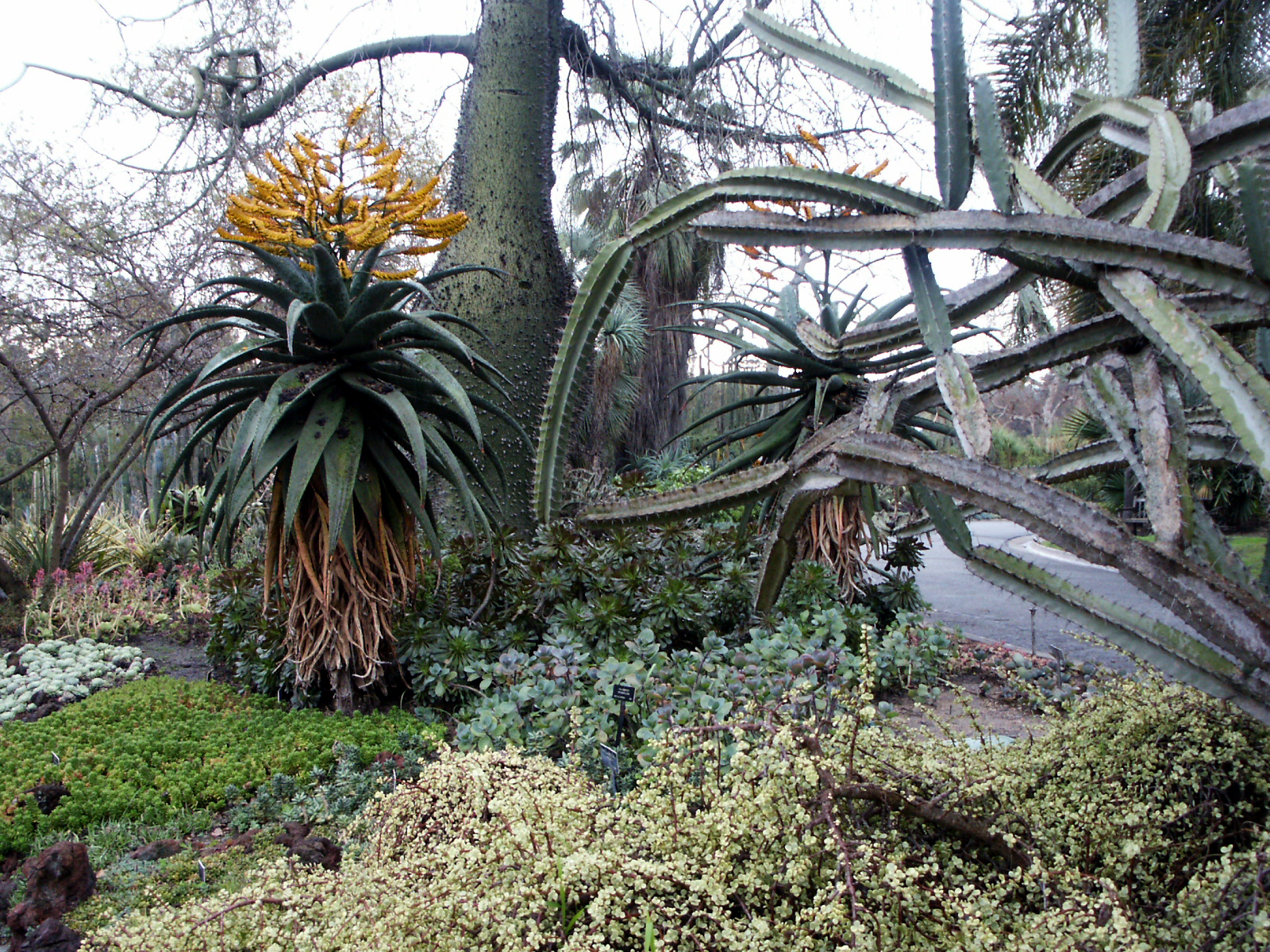
Aloe marlothii in bloom, with Ceiba speciosa and euphorbia

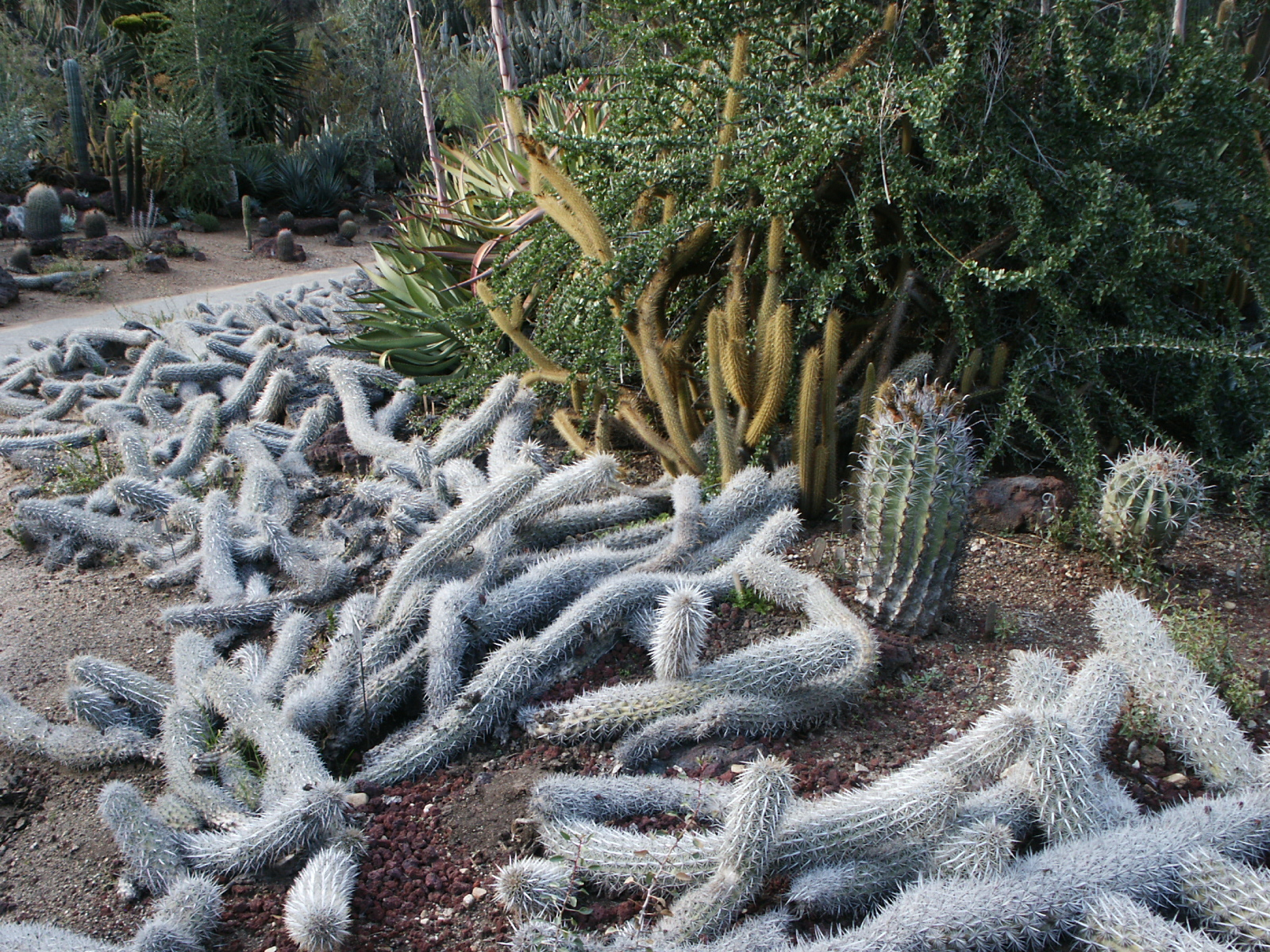
Creeping Devils (Stenocereus eruca), with Fouquieria and barrel cacti

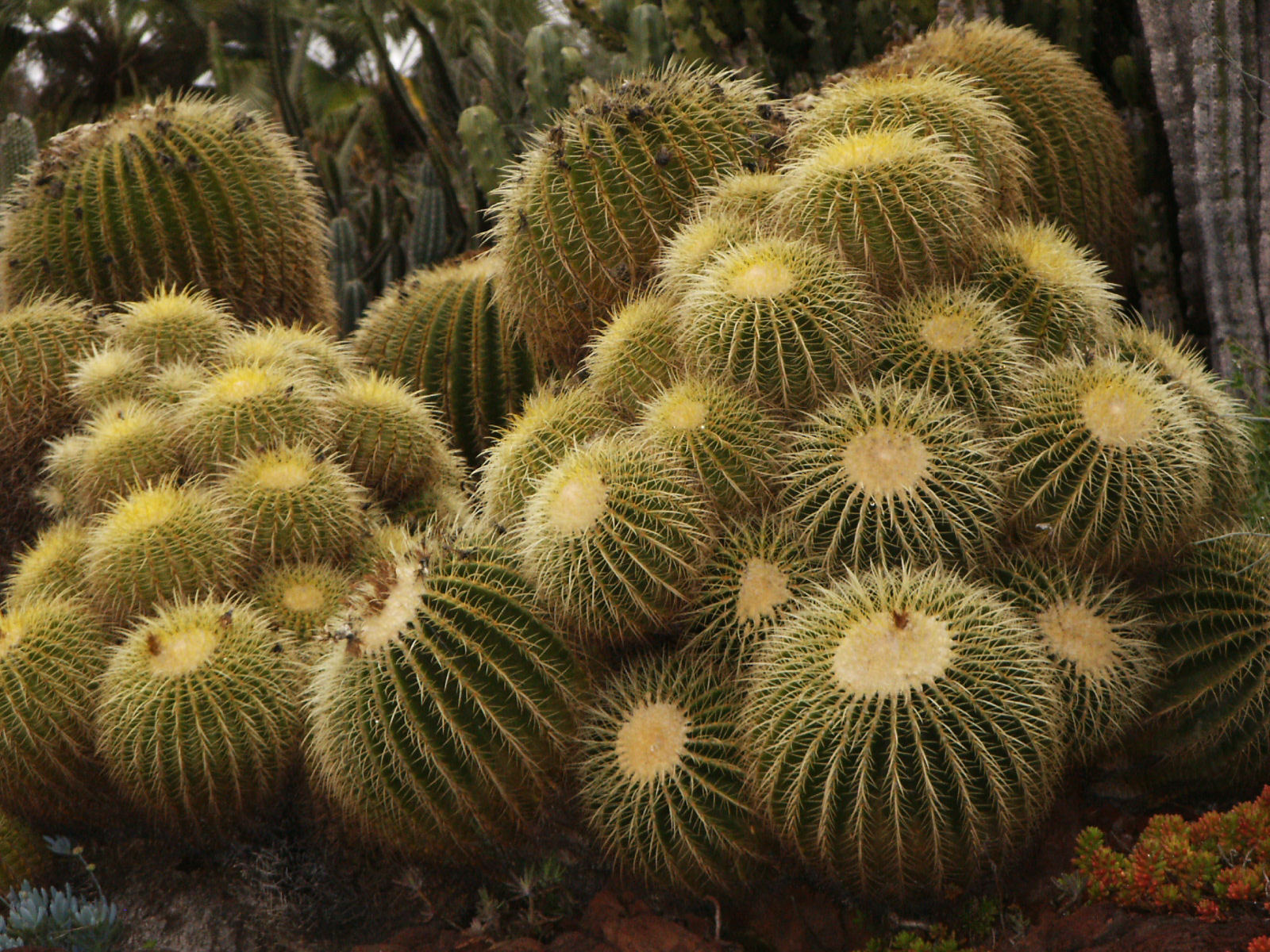
A group of mature Golden Barrels (Echinocactus grusonii) showing their distinctive clustering habit. The Golden Barrel collection at the Huntington may be the finest in the world.

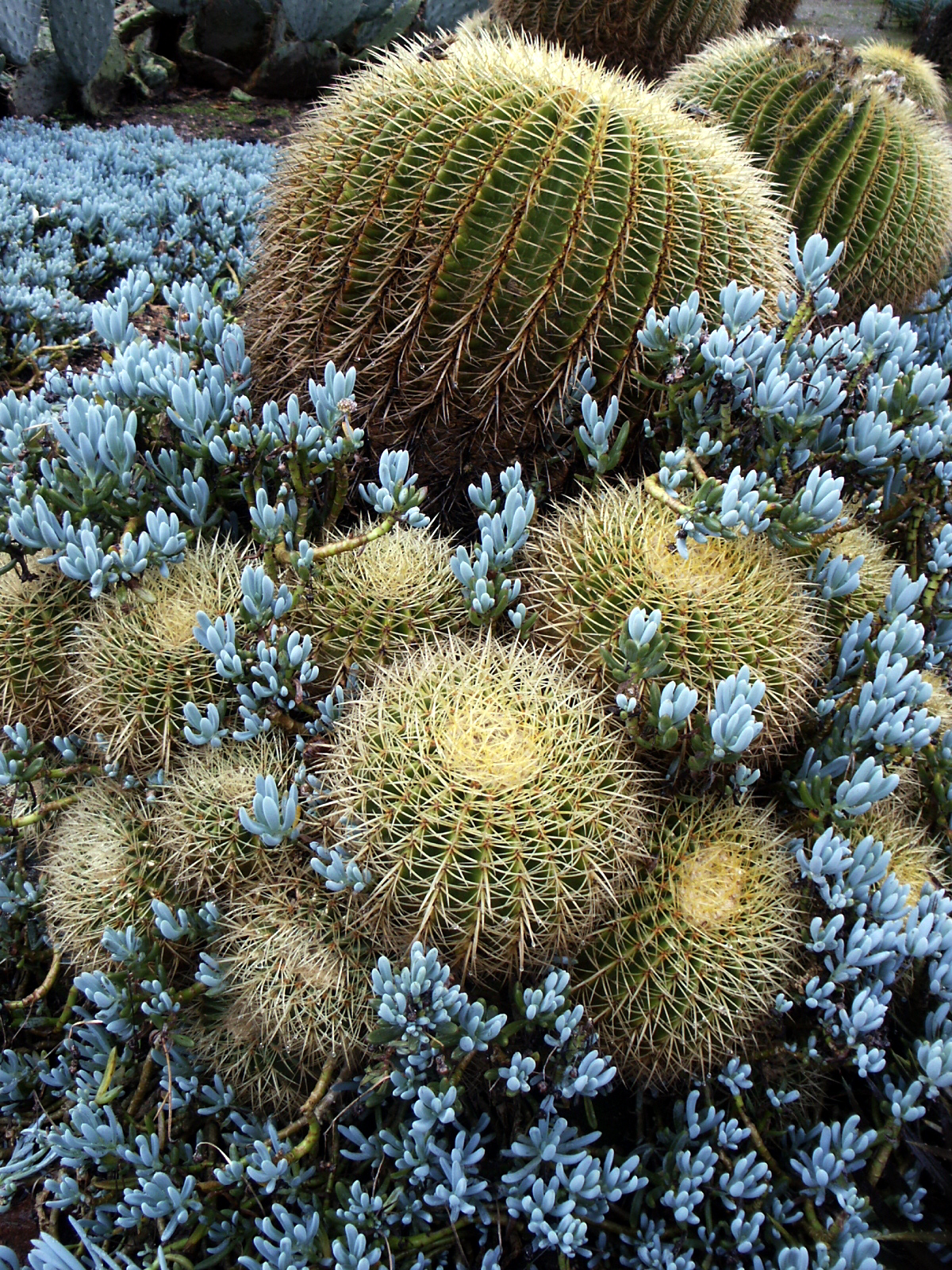
Golden Barrels with Senecio mandraliscae, Blue Stick or Blue Finger succulents

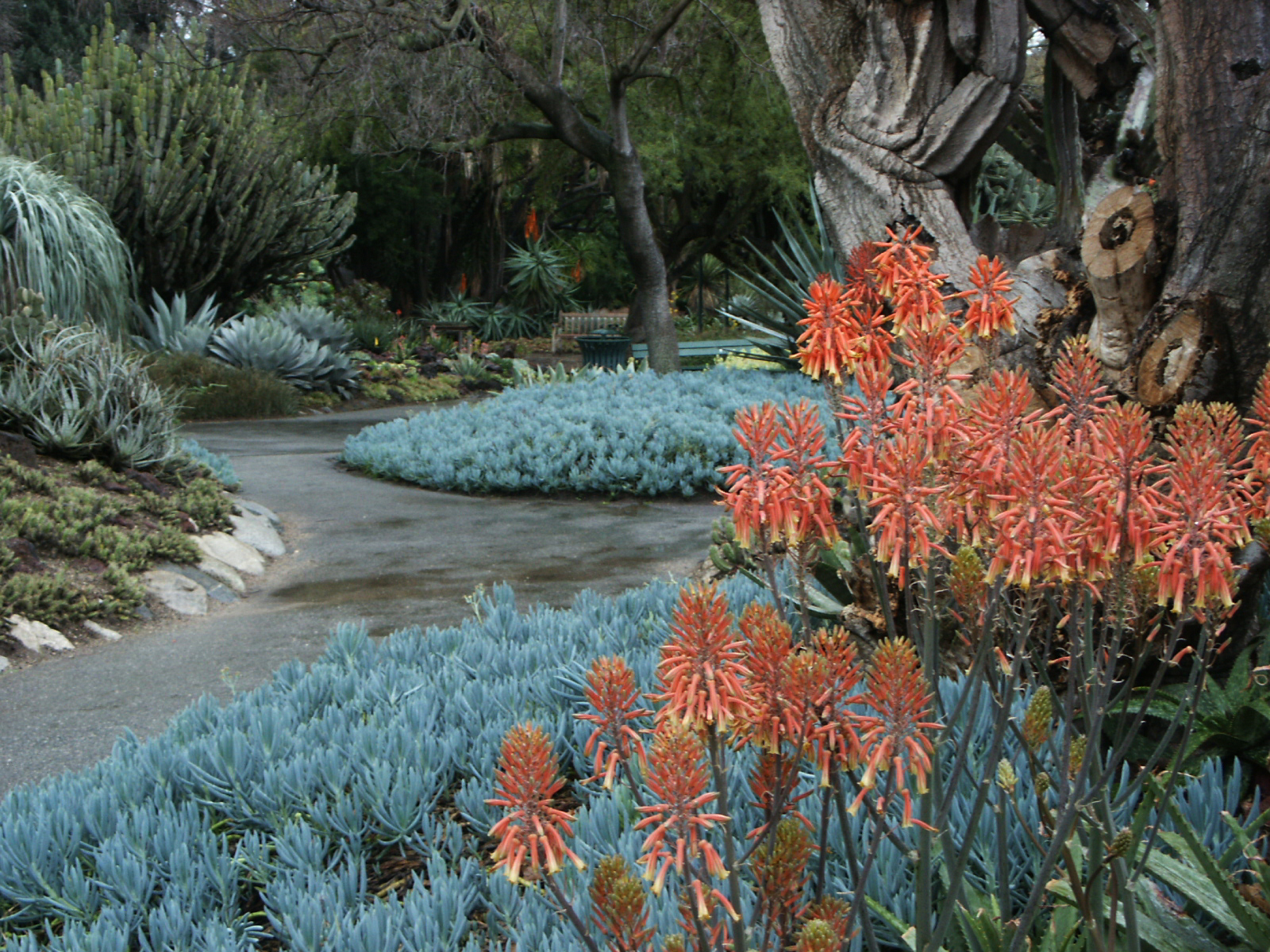
Aloe saponaria (Zebra or African aloe) and Blue Stick succulents (Senecio mandraliscae), showing pathways and garden layout and design.

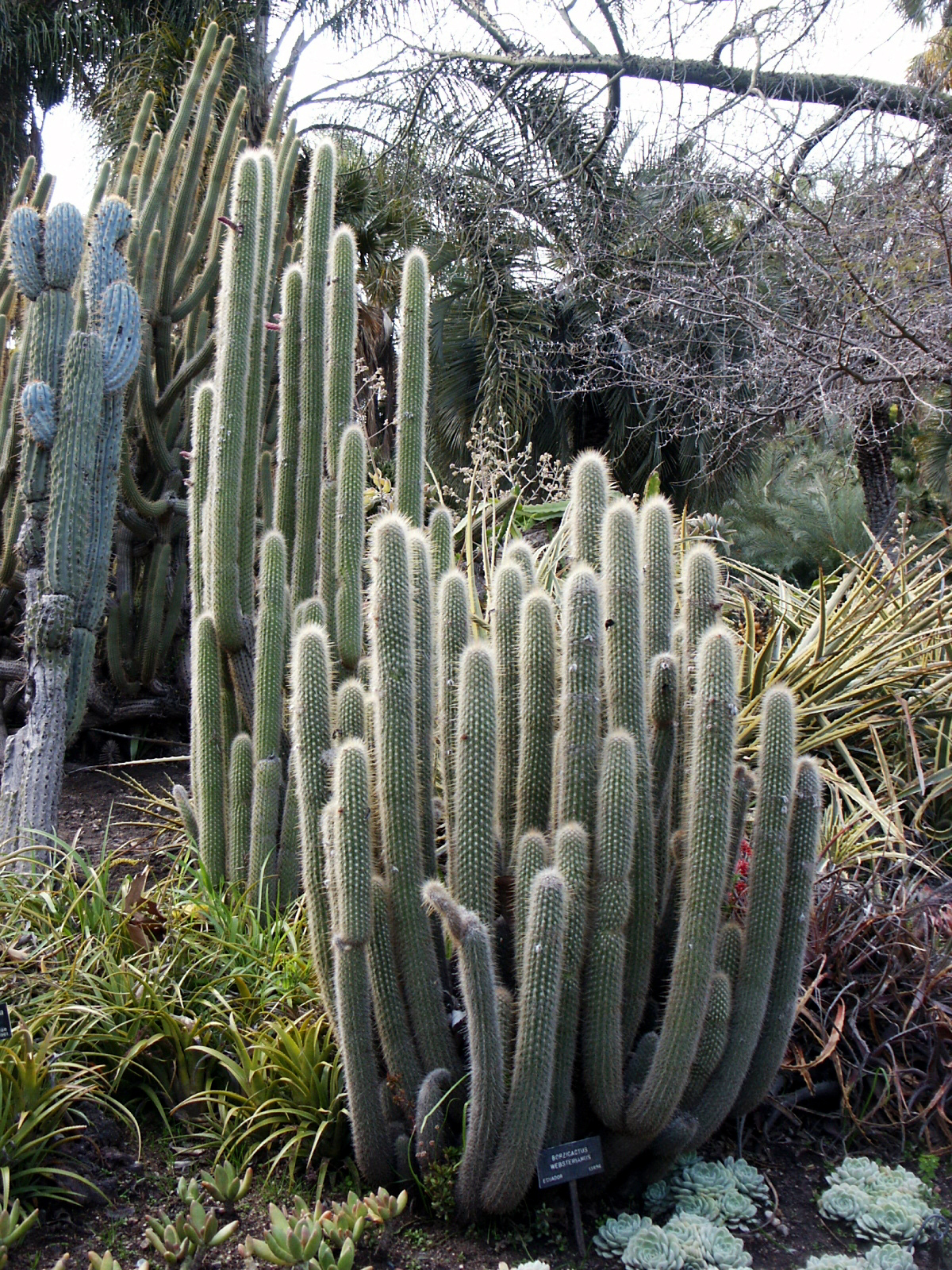
Borzicactus websteramus and other, related columnar Cleistocactus species
