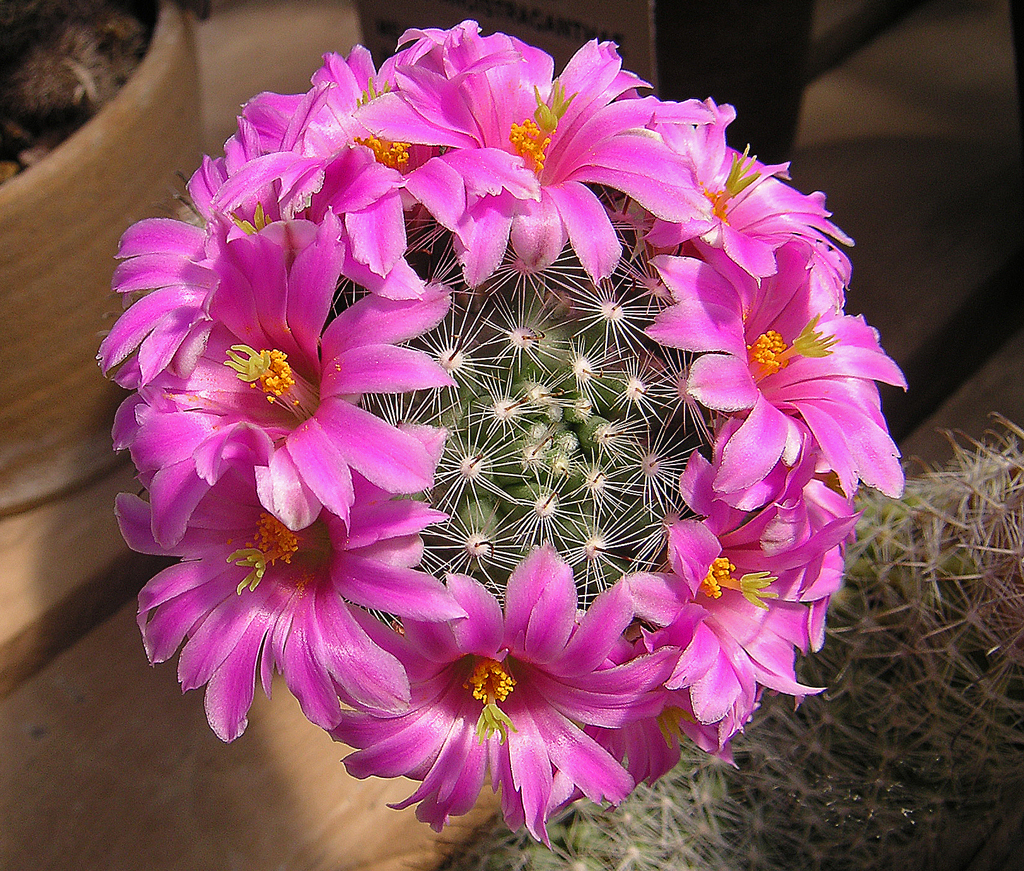

Conservation status
- Near Threatened (IUCN 3.1)

Scientific classification
- Kingdom: Plantae
- Clade: Tracheophytes
- Clade: Angiosperms
- Clade: Eudicots
- Order: Caryophyllales
- Family: Cactaceae
- Subfamily: Cactoideae
- Genus: Cochemiea
- Species: C. boolii

Binomial name
- Cochemiea boolii (G.E.Linds.) P.B.Breslin & Majure

Synonyms
- Mammillaria boolii G.E.Linds., 1953; Chilita boolii (G.E.Linds.) Buxb. (1954, nom. inval. ICBN article 33.3); Bartschella boolii (G.E.Linds.) Doweld (2000)

= Cochemiea boolii =

Species of cactus

Cochemiea boolii is a species of cactus in the subfamily Cactoideae with pink-petaled flowers.

== Description ==
Cochemiea boolii usually grows singly, rarely the plant branches at the base and then forms small groups. The spherical to short cylindrical, light gray-green shoots reach a height of 3.5 centimeters and a diameter of 3 centimeters. The naked axillae are located between the round warts. The species does not produce milky juice. It also has a natural defense system of thorns protecting the green base of the plant. The single, yellow to yellowish-brown central spine is strongly hooked with a dark tip and up to 20 millimeters long. The white, approximately 20 marginal spines are needle-like, straight and lie close to the body. They reach a length of 15 millimeters.

The pink to lavender-pink flowers are 4 centimeters long and 4 centimeters in diameter. The clubby, orange fruits are up to 30 millimeters long and contain black seeds.

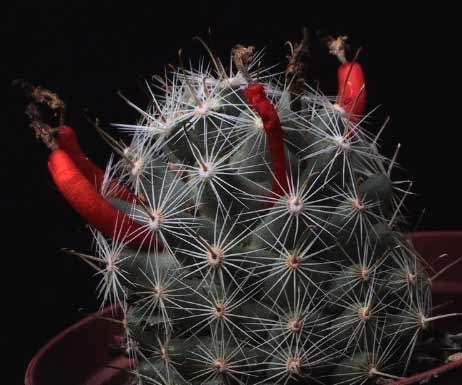
Fruits

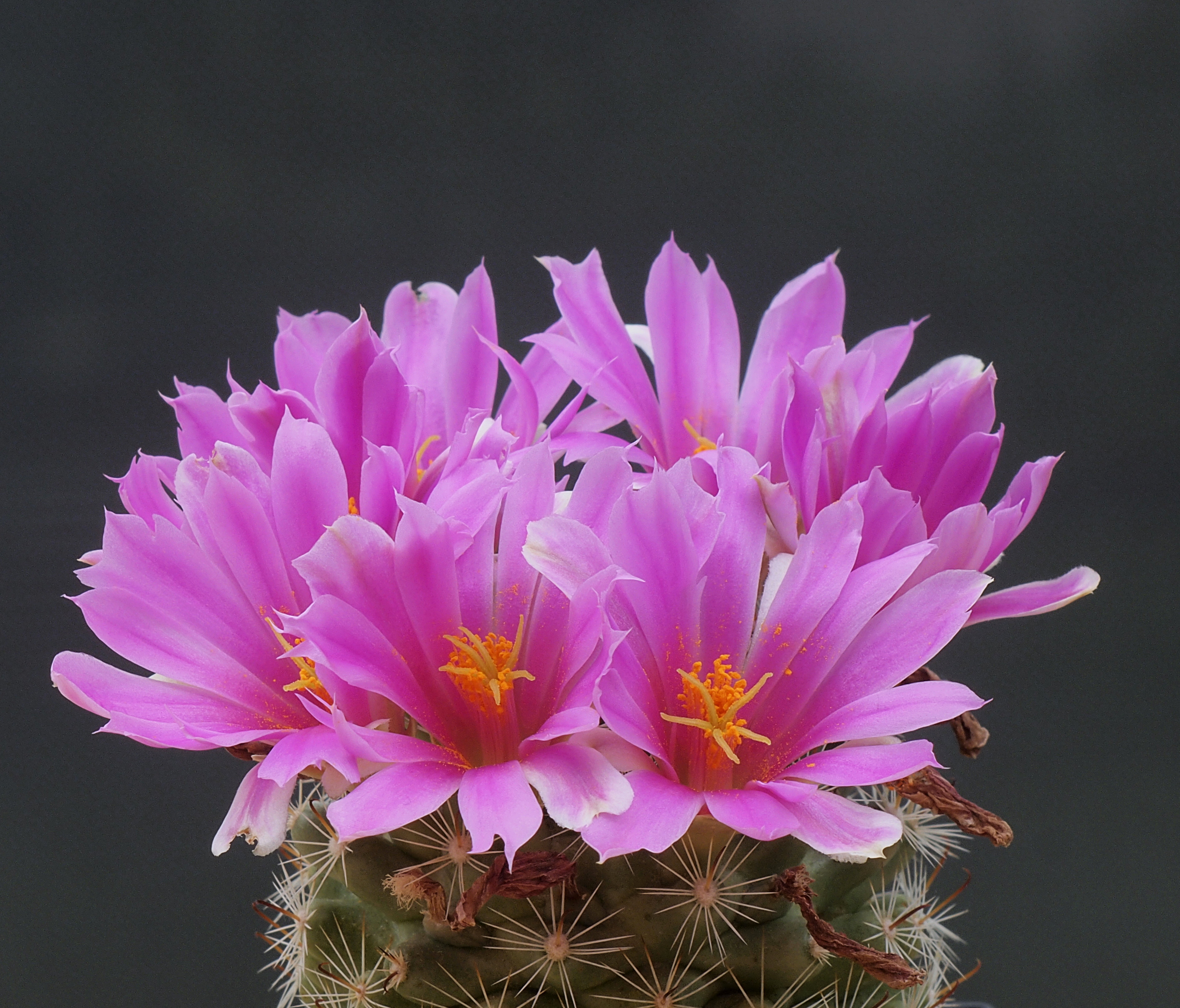
Flowers

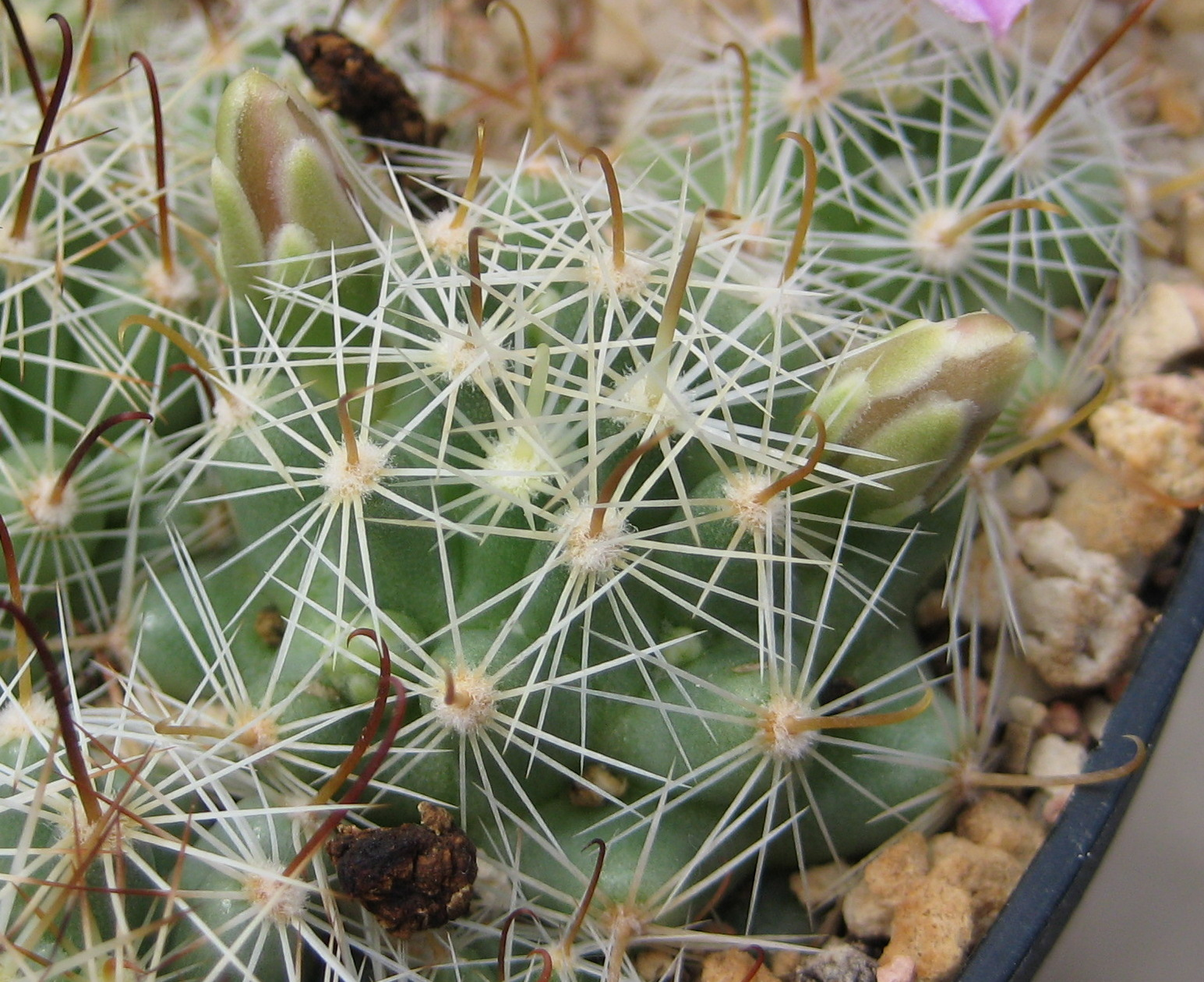
Spines

== Distribution ==
Cochemiea boolii is native to the lower elevations of the Mexican state of Sonora, found near mostly rocky soils, coastal mountains, and in thin forests and often seen with Echinocereus scopulorum, Echinocereus engelmannii, Mammillaria swinglei, and Ferocactus emoryi. Mammillaria boolii is considered "near threatened" by IUCN and is under threat by urban development.

== Taxonomy ==
It was first described as Mammillaria boolii in 1953 by George Edmund Lindsay. The specific epithet boolii honors the American Herbert W. Bool, the discoverer of the species and founder of the Botanical Garden in Phoenix. Peter B. Breslin and Lucas C. Majure placed the species in the genus Cochemiea in 2021. Further nomenclature synonyms are Chilita boolii (G.E.Linds.) Buxb. (1954, nom. inval. ICBN article 33.3) and Bartschella boolii (G.E.Linds.) Doweld (2000).
