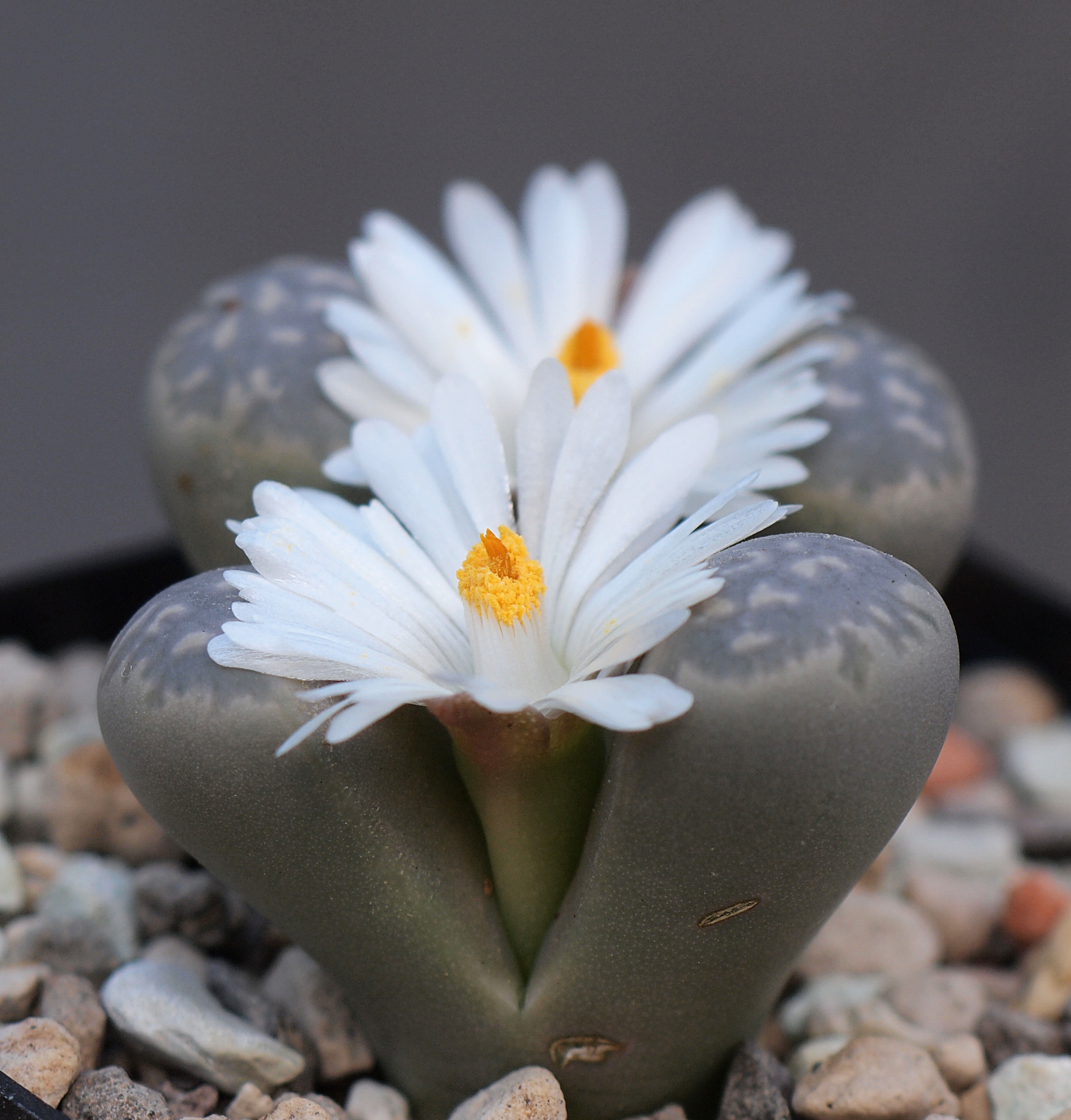

Scientific classification
- Kingdom: Plantae
- Clade: Tracheophytes
- Clade: Angiosperms
- Clade: Eudicots
- Order: Caryophyllales
- Family: Aizoaceae
- Genus: Lithops
- Species: L. marmorata

Binomial name
- Lithops marmorata (N.E.Br.) N.E.Br.

Synonyms
- Lithops diutina L. Bol.; Lithops elisae De Boer; Lithops framesii L. Bol.; Lithops marmorata var. elisae (De Boer) Cole; Lithops umdausensis L. Bol.; Mesembryanthemum marmoratum N. E. Br.

= Lithops marmorata =

Species of plant

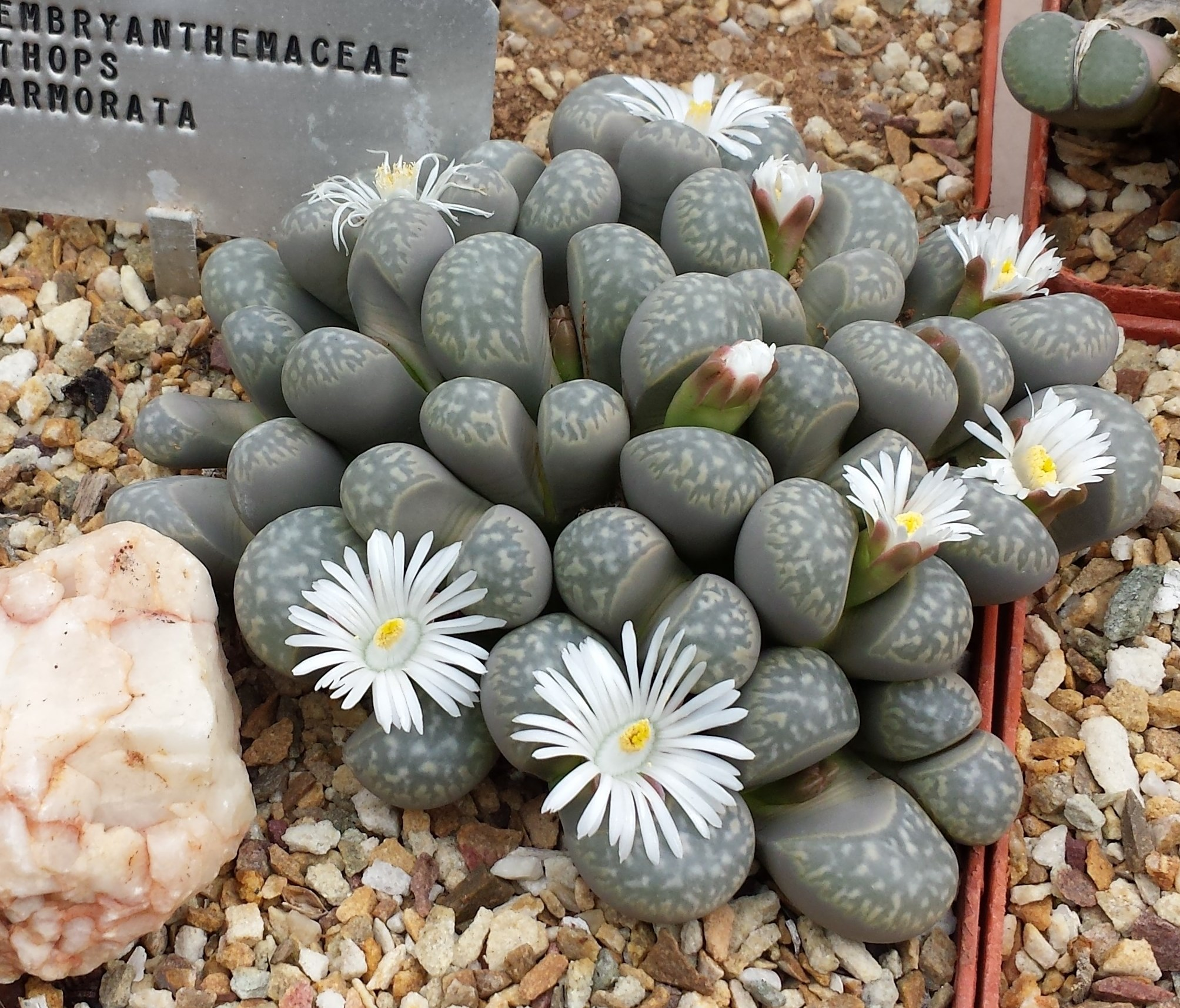
Lithops marmorata

Lithops marmorata is a species of succulent pebble plant. It is native to the Northern Cape Province of South Africa. The specific name is derived from the Latin word marmorata meaning "marbled".

== Description ==
It is a succulent perennial that grows in a clumping formation. Its leaves are enormously bulbous and are usually a grey to light green color, with a marbled pattern on the top. The flower is much like a daisy, and sprouts from between each pair of leaves.
