= Cactus garden =

Garden specializing in cacti and desert plants

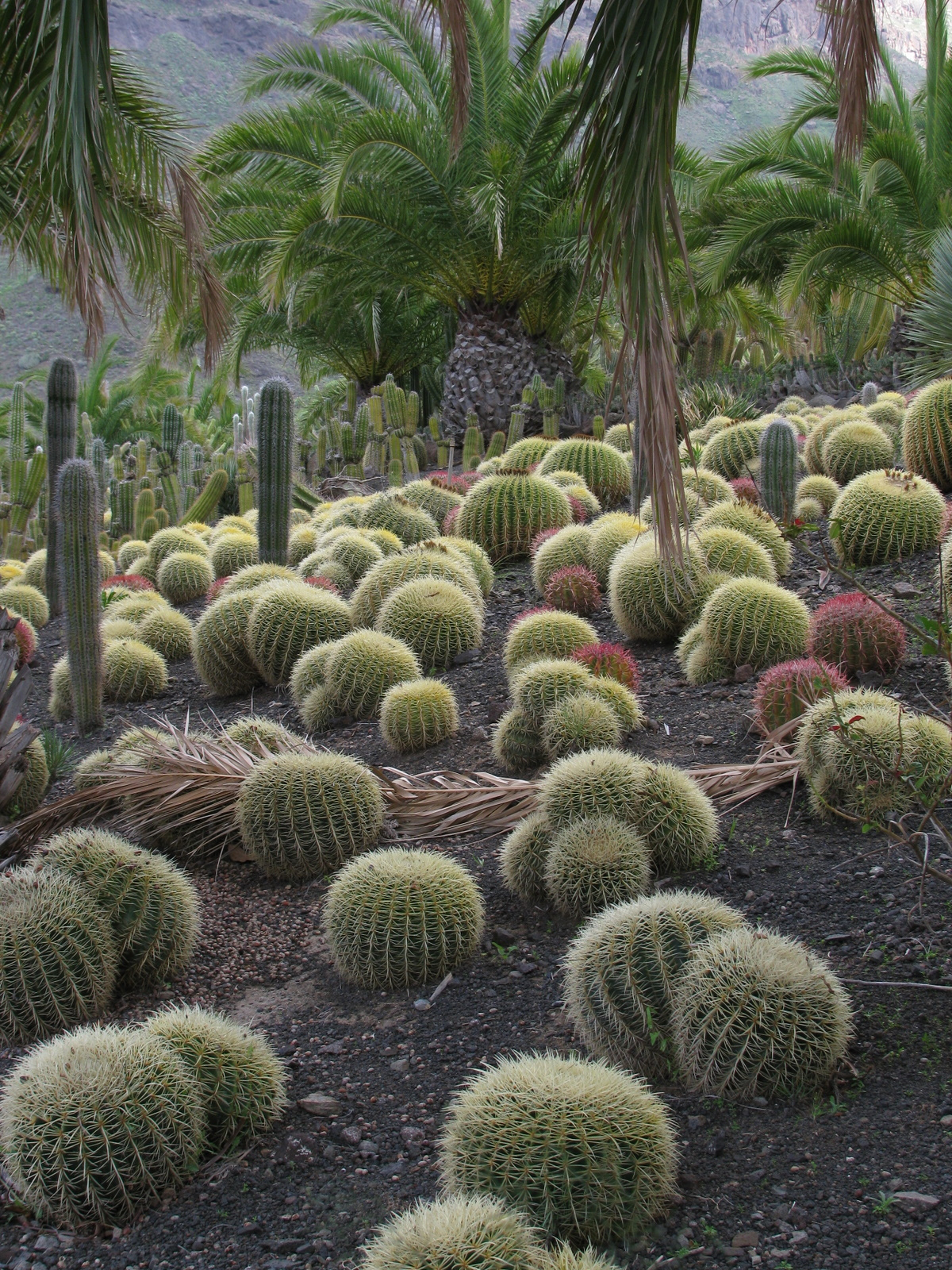
Cactus garden in La Aldea de San Nicolás, Gran Canaria

A cactarium or cactuario (from Latin, cactarium) is a garden dedicated to the planting of cacti. While they generally specialize in collecting cacti, they can also include other desert plants such as sabla, agaves or Crassulaceae, although this would better be termed "xeriscaping".

Cacti are succulent plants native to the American continent, typical of arid environments. They require dry conditions and therefore, in many countries, the collections are kept in greenhouses that protect from rain. Due to their low need for water, they are a sustainable landscaping option.

Cactariums also tend to host plants from other botanical families, native to the desert regions of the world.

== History ==
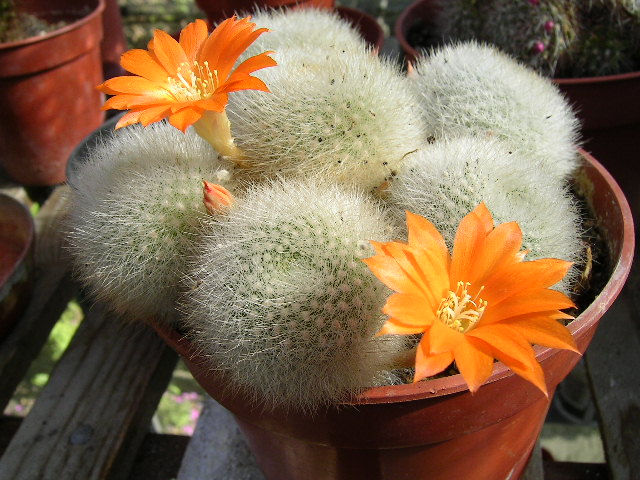
Rebutia minuscula

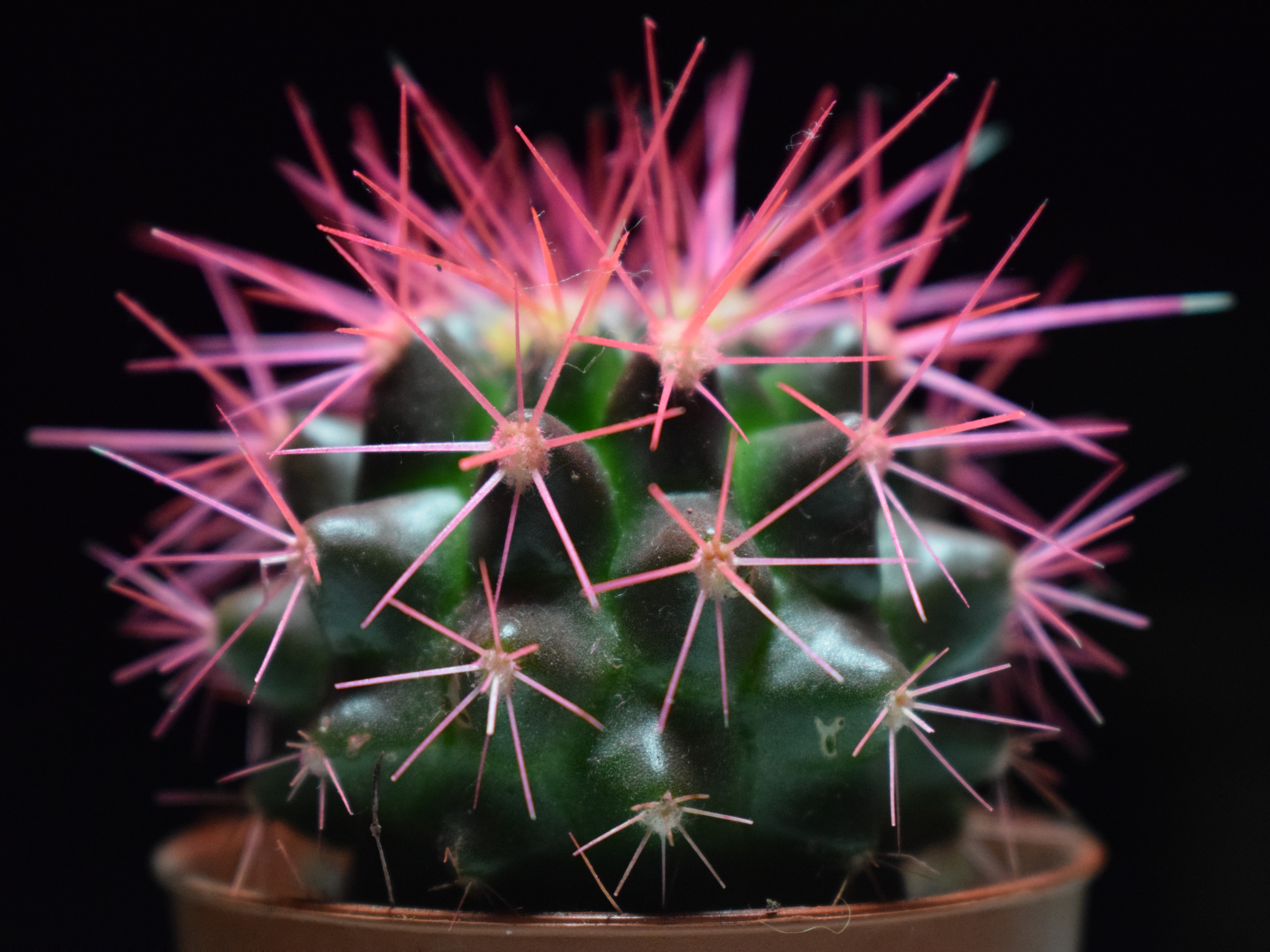
Echinocactus grusonii with hand-painted spikes

A cactus garden is a garden for the cultivation and display with many types of cacti. Cacti, due to their unusual appearance for Europeans, attracted the attention of the first European colonizers of Americas and were brought to Europe as ornamental plants already in the 16th century.

The first known collection of cacti was collected in the second half of the 16th century by the pharmacist Morgan in London. Popularity of these plants constantly grew, which was also facilitated by the biological characteristics of many cacti – tolerance of infrequent watering and dry air (the latter is essential for room culture), and easy vegetative reproduction. Also, indoor types of cacti (in particular Rebutia) can be moved in pots to the garden during summer. In botanical gardens of many European countries as well as in private greenhouses, significant collections have been accumulated.

== List of cactus gardens ==
- Arizona Cactus Garden (Stanford, United States)
- Cactario Alvaralto (Olmué, Chile)
- Company's Garden (Cape Town, South Africa)
- Desert Garden Conservatory (San Marino, United States)
- Desert City (San Sebastián de los Reyes, Spain)
- Dubuque Arboretum and Botanical Gardens (Dubuque, United States)
- Huntington Desert Garden (Los Angeles, United States)
- Jardin botanique d'Èze (Èze, France)
- Quito Botanical Garden (Quito, Ecuador)
- Desert Botanical Garden (Phoenix, Arizona)
- Ethel M Botanical Cactus Garden (Henderson, Nevada)
- Chirau Mita Botanical Garden (La Puntilla, Argentina)
- Moorten Botanical Garden and Cactarium (Palm Springs, United States)
- Ethnobotanical Garden of Oaxaca (Oaxaca, Mexico)
- Jardin Exotique de Monaco (Monaco)
- Vermont Experimental Cold Hardy Cactus Garden (Middlebury, United States)
- Lanzarote Cactus Garden (Teguise, Spain)
- Majorelle Garden (Marrakesh, Morocco)
- Orman Garden (Cairo, Egypt)
- Kapiʻolani Community College Cactus Garden (Honolulu, Hawaii)
- Palmengarten (Frankfurt am Main, Germany)
- Moir Gardens (Poipu, Hawaii)
- Mossèn Costa i Llobera Gardens (Barcelona, Spain)
- National Cactus and Succulent Botanical Garden and Research Centre (Panchkula, India)
- North Central Oklahoma Cactus Botanical Garden (Covington, United States)
- Sherman Library and Gardens (California, United States)
- Taman Kaktus (Jakarta, Indonesia)
- West Wetlands Park (Yuma, United States)
- Western Colorado Botanical Gardens (Grand Junction, United States)
- Zilker Botanical Garden (Austin, United States)

== See also ==
- Garden design
- Xeriscaping
- List of garden types
