= La Puntilla =

La Puntilla may refer to:

- La Puntilla, Belén, Catamarca, Argentina
- La Puntilla, Santa María, Catamarca, Argentina
- La Puntilla, Tinogasta, Catamarca, Argentina
- La Puntilla, La Rioja, a city in Argentina
- La Puntilla District, Luján de Cuyo Department, Mendoza, Argentina
- La Puntilla (Samborondón), a parish of Samborondón, Ecuador
- La Puntilla beach, in El Puerto de Santa María, Cádiz, Spain
