= Hildmann =

Hildmann is a German surname. Notable people with the surname include:

- Attila Hildmann (born 1981), German cookbook author
- Heinrich Hildmann (c. 1845–after 1918), German plantsman
- Sascha Hildmann (born 1972), German football manager
