= Chirau Mita Botanical Garden =

Botanical garden in Argentina

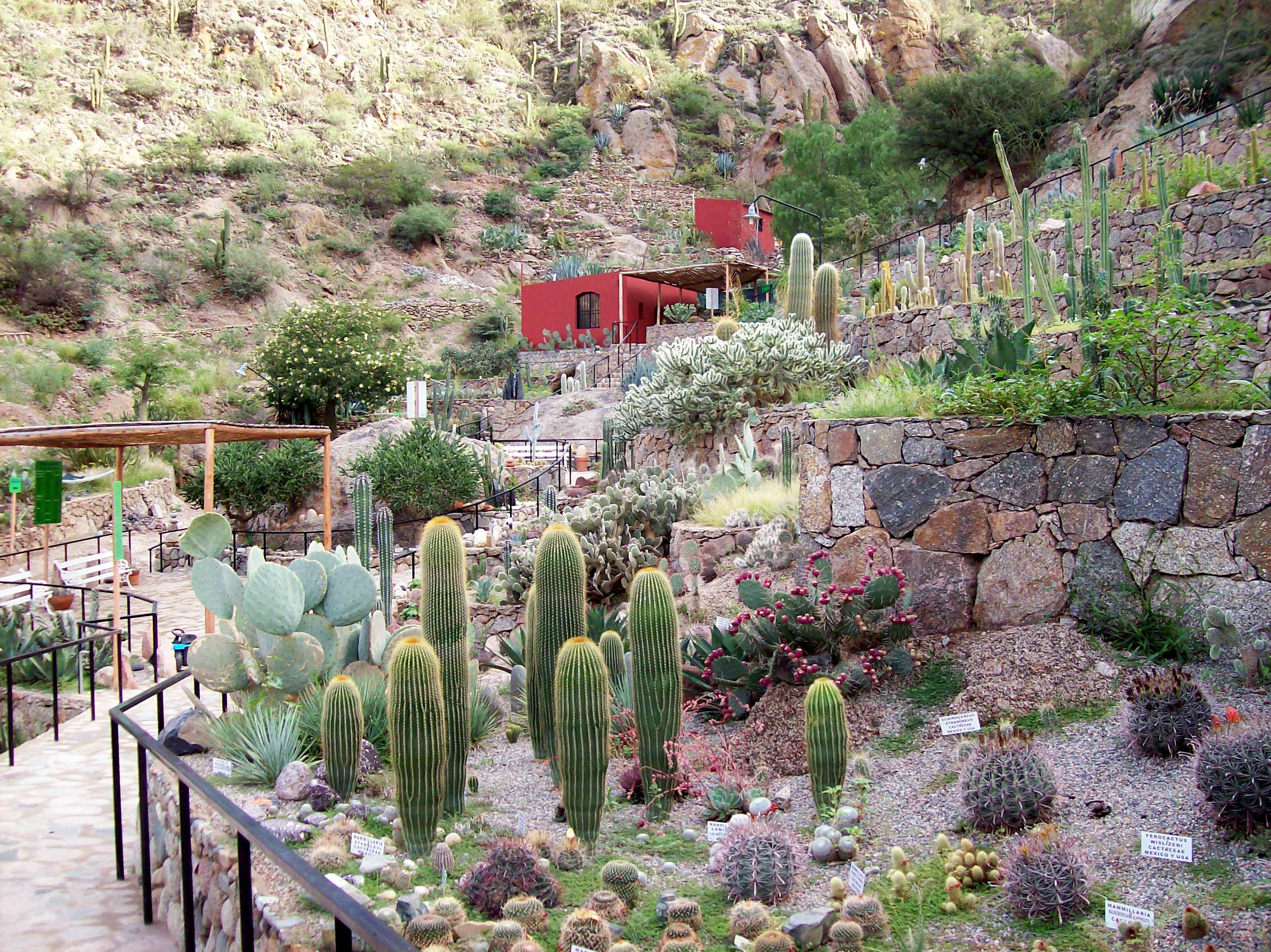
- Chirau Mita Botanical Garden

- Location within Argentina
- Type: botanical garden
- Location: La Puntilla, Chilecito Department, La Rioja Province, Argentina
- Nearest town: La Puntilla, La Rioja, Argentina
- Coordinates: 29°09′36″S 67°29′15″W
- Area: 10,000 m^{2} (110,000 sq ft)
- Created: 2003
- Owner: private
- Operator: private, non-profit
- Status: Open all year

Chirau Mita is a botanical garden in Argentina, which brings together more than 1,200 species of cacti from all over the world, as well as various genera of trees and species from dry environments, such as aloe vera and the agave.

It is considered the first botanical garden dedicated exclusively to the study and conservation of cacti (Cactaceae and succulents) in Latin America.

== History ==
The project by Patricia Granillo and Sebastián Carod started in 1996 as a study on cultivation in arid zones and ended up having as its objective the education, dissemination and conservation of the most representative plants of the American continent and some of others.

It was founded in 2003 (due to lack of funds it closed in 2008 but reopened in 2010) and is the first botanical garden dedicated exclusively to the study and conservation of cacti in Latin America.

== Description ==
Garden has more than 1,400 species from countries such as Mexico, Peru, Argentina, South Africa, Namibia, Ecuador (Galapagos Islands ), United States, Madagascar and others. Some of the strangest species that can be found in the garden are the Welwitschia mirabilis, from Namibia, and Aloe dichotoma, a tree over 30 years old that comes from South Africa and Namibia.

With more than 10,000 square meters of cultivation on terraces, the garden put into practice an ancestral cultivation system called pircas and terraces, which recreates the old gardens and pukaras aborigines that generated mainly by the Incas. Its layout and construction allow a direct appreciation, and at various levels, of all the floors, making the walk more dynamic and dividing it by sectors of interest and adaptation.

When you reach the top of the mountain, you can see the city of Chilecito with the bell tower of the church of Santa Rita de Casia standing out between the roofs of the houses, the Cuesta de Miranda and, in the distance, the peaks snow-capped mountains of the Famatina.

== Archaeological Museum ==
In addition to the Garden on site there is an "Archaeological Museum of Cultures", which exhibits objects from the Ayampitin, Aguada, Diaguita, Inca and Belen cultures. There are stone tweezers, funeral urns and a figure of "The Lady of Vichigasta", representing the fertility deity. There are also some dinosaur eggs that were found in the region.

== Location ==
The Garden is located in the town La Puntilla, in the department of Chilecito, 200 kilometers from the capital of the province of La Rioja, Argentina.
