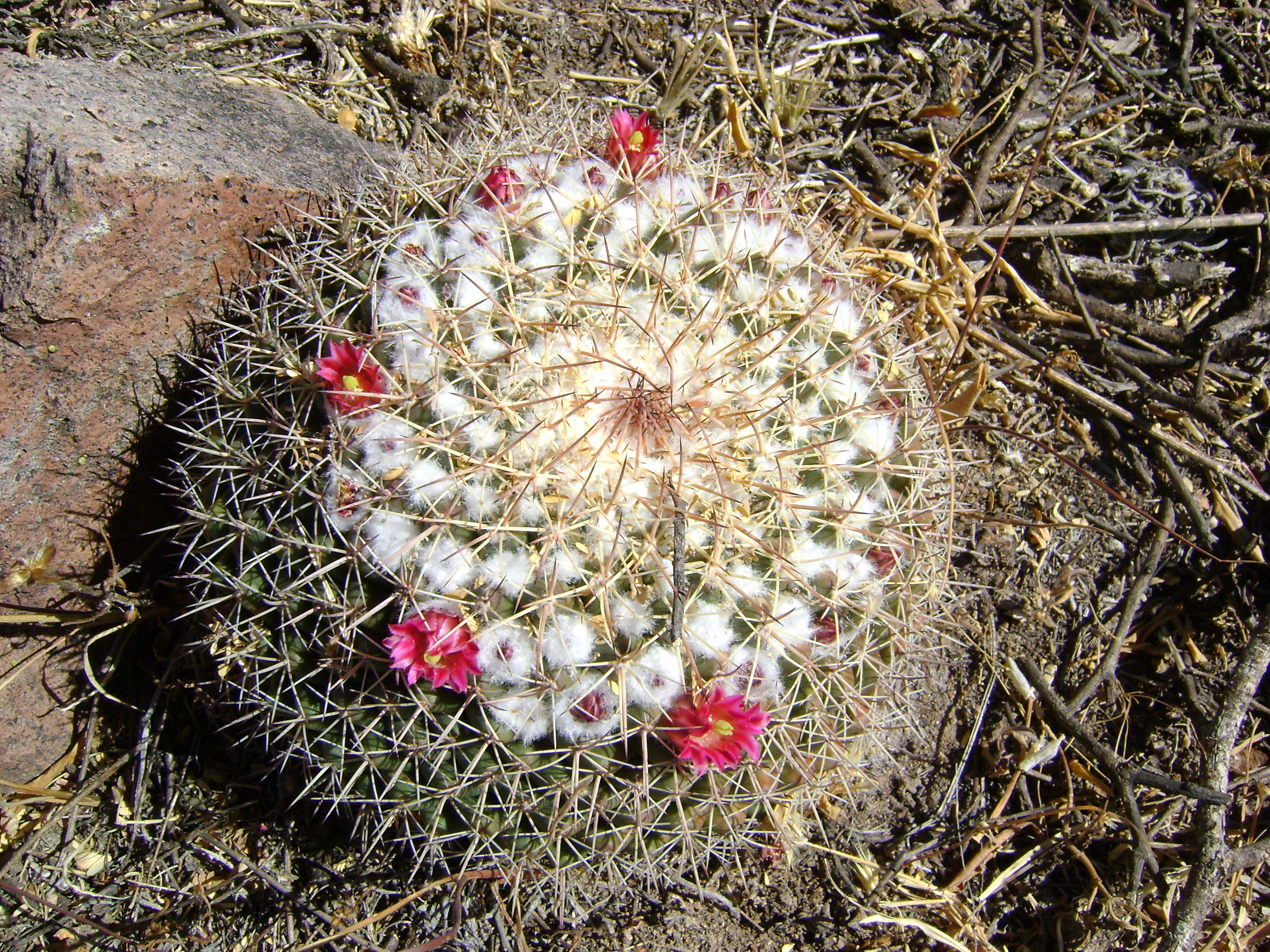
- Beginning to flower in January in Zacatecas, Mexico
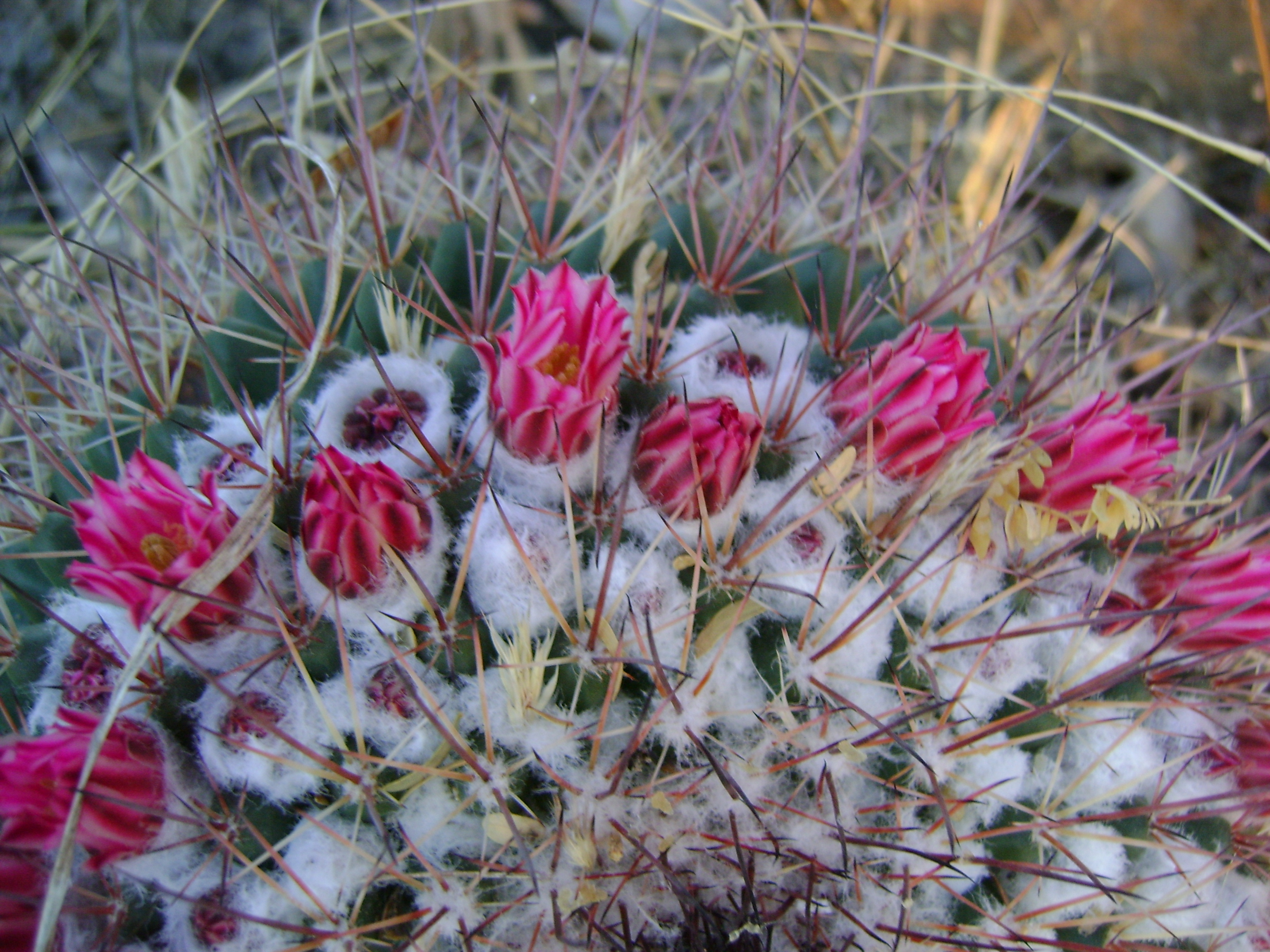
- Close-up of flowers ringing the crown

Scientific classification
- Kingdom: Plantae
- Clade: Embryophytes
- Clade: Tracheophytes
- Clade: Angiosperms
- Clade: Eudicots
- Order: Caryophyllales
- Family: Cactaceae
- Subfamily: Cactoideae
- Genus: Mammillaria
- Species: M. petterssonii

Binomial name
- Mammillaria petterssonii Hildm.

Synonyms
- List: Mammillaria apozolensis Repp.; Mammillaria apozolensis var. saltensis Repp.; Mammillaria heeseana McDowell; Mammillaria huiguerensis Repp.; Mammillaria obscura Hildm.; Neomammillaria obscura (Hildm.) Britton & Rose; Neomammillaria petterssonii (Hildm.) Britton & Rose

= Mammillaria petterssonii =

Species of flowering plant

Mammillaria petterssonii is a species of cactus in the genus Mammillaria, native to northeast and southwest Mexico. It has gained the Royal Horticultural Society's Award of Garden Merit.
