= Jardin botanique d'Èze =

Botanical garden in Èze, France

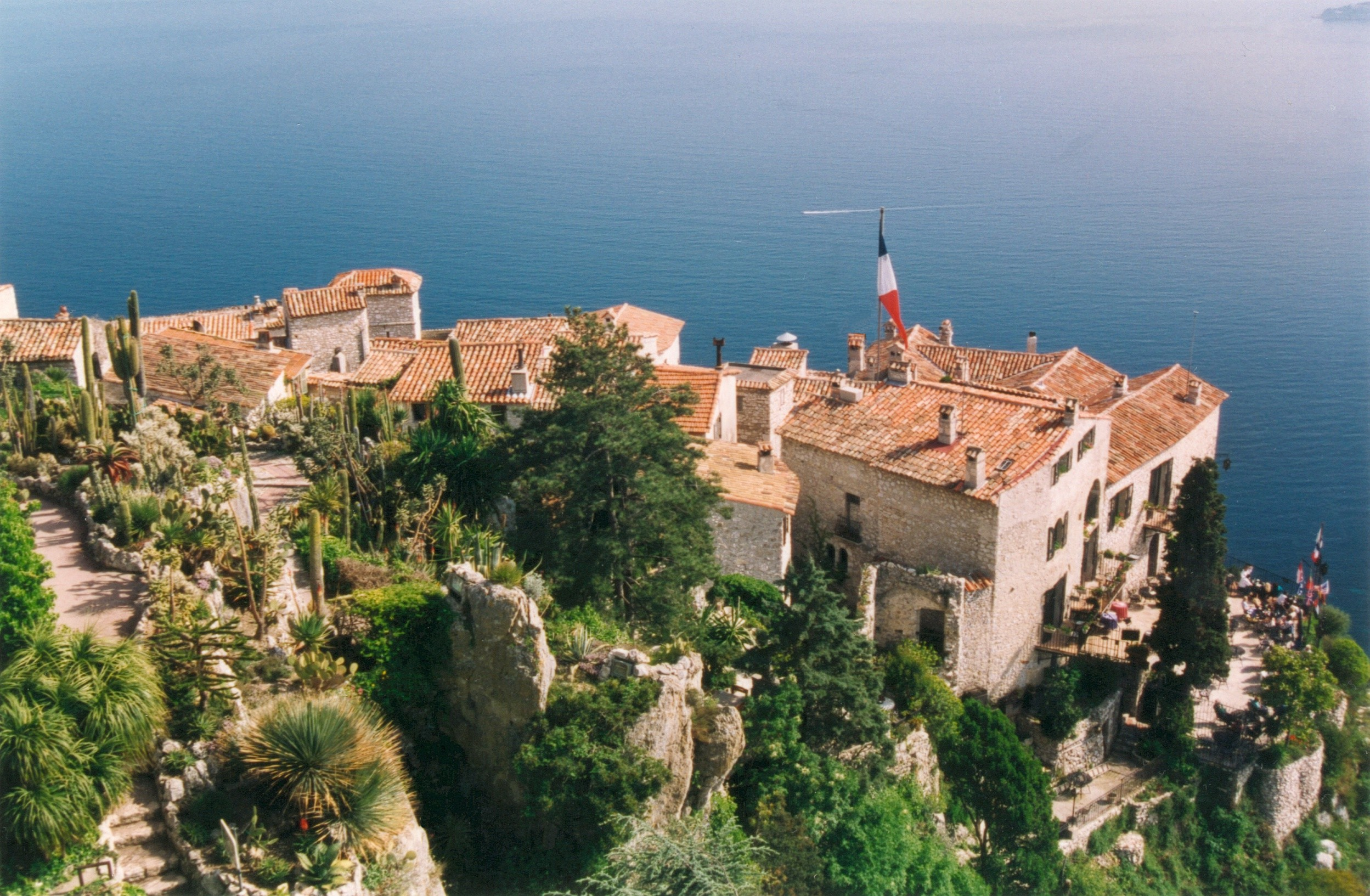
- Jardin botanique d'Èze
- Interactive map of Jardin botanique d'Èze
- Type: cactus garden
- Location: Èze, Alpes-Maritimes, Provence-Alpes-Côte d'Azur, France
- Coordinates: 43°43′41″N 7°21′40″E
- Created: after World War II
- Founder: André Gianton and Jean Gastaud
- Open: Yes
- Website: www.jardinexotique-eze.fr/en/

The Jardin botanique d'Èze, also called the Jardin exotique d'Èze or simply the Jardin d'Èze, is a botanical garden located on the Place du Général de Gaulle in Èze, Alpes-Maritimes, Provence-Alpes-Côte d'Azur, France.

The garden was created after World War II on a chateau's ruins by town mayor André Gianton and Jean Gastaud of the Jardin Exotique de Monaco. It is sited on steep terrain falling over 400 meters to the sea with panoramic views of the coast, and known for its impressive collection of cactus and succulents from the Mediterranean region, Africa, and the Americas.

== Collection ==
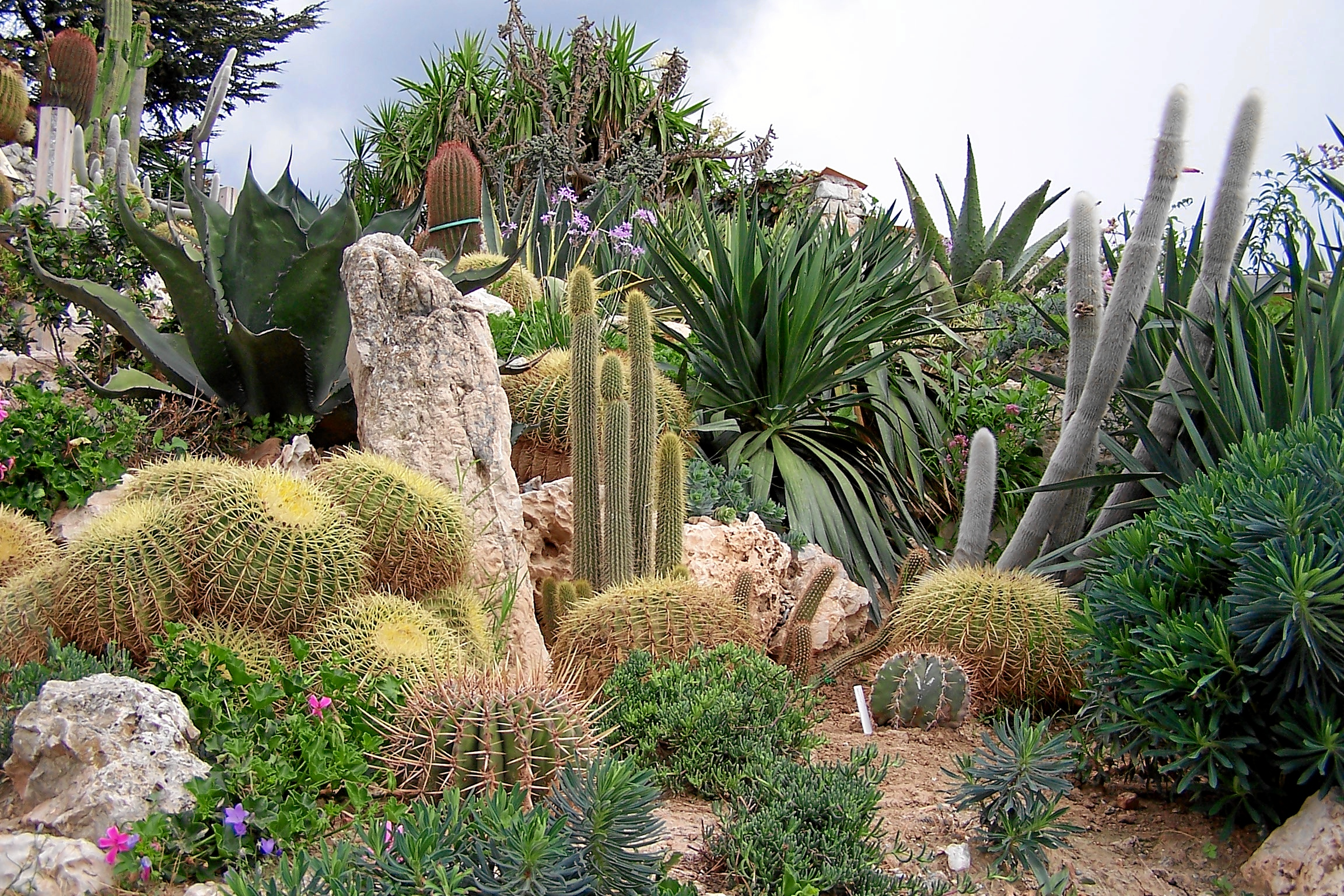
Garden specimens

Today the garden's collections include Cephalocereus senilis, Echinocactus grusonii, Ferocactus pilosus, Opuntia spp., Neobuxbaumia polylopha, and Trichocereus pasacana, as well as the succulents Aeonium arboreum, Aeonium canariense, Agave americana var. picta, Agave americana var. marginata, Agave salmiana, Agave victoriae-reginae, Aloe arborescens, Aloe succotrina, Aloe ferox, Aloiampelos ciliaris, Carpobrotus edulis, Echeveria elegans, Euphorbia coerulescens, Pachyphytum oviferum, and Yucca elephantipes.

== See also ==
- List of botanical gardens in France
