= West Wetlands Park =

Public park in Yuma, Arizona, US

- Interactive map of West Wetlands Park
- Type: Botanical garden and Zoo
- Location: Yuma, Arizona
- Coordinates: 32.73034°N 114.63992°W
- Created: 2002
- Open: Yes
- Website: www.yumaaz.gov/Home/Components/FacilityDirectory/FacilityDirectory/72/236

The West Wetlands Park is a public city park in the northwest edge of Yuma, Arizona. It is located along the Colorado River within the Yuma Crossing National Heritage Area. The park opened in December of 2002 on 110 acres of city-owned land. It was partially constructed by community volunteers. The West Wetlands Park is currently managed by a non-profit organization, the Yuma Crossing National Heritage Area Corporation, and is maintained by the City of Yuma Parks and Recreation Department.

== History ==
=== 1910–1989 ===
From 1910 to 1970 the area that would become West Wetlands Park was used as the City of Yuma's landfill. After the landfill was closed, the deserted area became a center for the homeless community and also a site of criminal activity. Periodically, fires burned native vegetation along the river allowing invasive species to overtake the habitat. Local residents saw the area as a hazard, and they were unable to access river resources.

Beginning in the 1980's, there was an interest by Yuma citizens to convert the previous landfill into a riverfront park. Arizona State Parks worked with the City of Yuma to develop a master plan which initially stalled due to lack of funding.

=== 1990–1999 ===
In early 1990, the United States Environmental Protection Agency (EPA) determined that covering the whole site with 6 to 8 feet of clean fill was required for reuse.

The Yuma Crossing National Heritage Area estimated that $10 million would be required to design a master plan that would include securing the funds for the clean-up and construction.

Over a three-year period, the Heritage Area was able to garner several million dollars in grant funding to advance the planning of the park. In September 1999, the Heritage Area sponsored a community planning effort to finalize the design of West Wetlands, completing the master plan. Part of "Phase 1" was conducted a month later when the Yuma Crossing hosted a volunteer day, where 700 volunteers planted 450 trees at the Millennium Tree Grove.

=== 2000–2006 ===
In 2001, an additional $500,000 was secured by Congressman Ed Pastor through the Bureau of Reclamation for the pilot re-vegetation project. The first phase of the park development opened in December 2002. The pond was dug in the first phase of the project and was completed, filled, and opened in late 2003 with the additional Reclamation grant funds. The pond has a bowl design and is approximately 15 feet deep.

In 2005, Arizona Public Service (APS) partnered with the City of Yuma to develop a solar demonstration garden. The solar garden consists of twenty-four photo-voltaic energy panels that produce 3,600 watts of power that is directed to the City of Yuma electrical grid and provides power in the park. It produces enough energy to power approximately twenty homes. The output of a single tracker is displayed in the armada in front of the solar garden. The panels rotate 80 degrees from the East in the morning to the West in the afternoon. After dark, a very small amount of energy from the grid is utilized to move the panels to face the East. The solar garden is owned and maintained by APS.

The Army of the West statue, also known as the Mormon statue, was created by R.C. Merrill. The statue was privately funded, along with a commitment for ongoing maintenance in 2006. Many Mormons of the Yuma community collaborated in the making of the nine foot bronze statue. 2nd Lt. Philemon Merrill and others participated in the 1900-mile march from Council Bluffs, Iowa to San Diego, California, which included crossing the Colorado River on January 9 and 10 of 1846. The statue was erected to honour the crossing and the contributions of those military organizations that led to the expansion of the west.

=== 2007–present ===
In 2007, the Stewart Vincent Wolfe Creative Playground was created by the combined effort of Yuman volunteers in honour of Stewart Vincent Wolfe's memory. Wolfe and his family were regular visitors at the park. Ron Martin, a close friend of Wolfe, donated $100,000 towards construction of the playground in honour of Wolfe. The development of playground started with a total of 8,000 Yuma volunteers, who raised further funds to contribute to the construction of the playground. The creative inspiration for the artistic design of the playground came from elementary school students.

For the rest of 2007, the initial plan for West Wetlands from 1999 was updated by the Heritage Area and the City of Yuma.

In 2009, using economic stimulus funds provided by the federal government, the paved walking trail was extended from the playground area to the southwest entrance to the park. The trail parallels the main road through the park and is equipped with lighting, increasing accessibility to the western portions of the park into the evening and providing bikers and joggers with a paved surface from one end of the park to the other.

In 2014, a new beach was opened in the park, to mark the 100th anniversary of Yuma. Situated along the Colorado River, it is aptly called Centennial Beach.

On December 28, 2014 the Stewart Vincent Wolfe Creative Playground was destroyed by a fire, which appeared intentional according to the local police department. The park's reconstruction started in September 2015, and re-opened 3 months later, on December 19. Due to a high level of community support, the playground was further expanded during the reconstruction process. In August of 2018, a teen suspect was arrested and charged with arson after admitting to starting the fire, almost 4 years after the incident.

== Activities and special events ==
The City of Yuma Parks and Recreation operates several multi-use trails within the park. Other activities include fishing in the pond and the Colorado River for a variety of species including catfish, bluegill, carp, rainbow trout, red-ear sunfish, mullet, and largemouth bass. Other activities include tubing canoeing, kayaking, motor boating, jet skiing, and swimming. The park has a boat launch ramp to facilitate putting craft into the water. On the pond, enthusiasts sail model sailboats.

West Wetlands has two playgrounds. The largest and most visited is the Stewart Vincent Wolfe Creative Playground. This playground consists of a tire swing, 4 regular swings, 1 adaptive swing for children with disabilities, a climbing wall, 6 slides, a train, a jet, monkey bars, multiple entrances, and more. The playground is surrounded by Pebble Flex ground which protects from accidental falls and makes wheelchair navigation easier. There is an area within the playground designed for younger children, but is also appealing to families with children of multiple ages. It includes one entrance, 3 baby/bucket swings, and smaller swings. There are multiple benches in the playground. There is also a play area that has faux rocks and a metal tractor scoop toy for children to climb on.

Special events at the park include:

- Walkathons/marathons Various 10k and 5k runs, Color Runs, the March of Dimes, the Diabetes Walk, Toro Loco and others.
- Colorado River Balloon Festival
- Two Rivers Renaissance Fair
- Movies in the park
- Blue Grass in the Park
- Jazz on the Green
- Catfish Rodeo
- Annual Float-down Regatta

== Plants ==
=== Invasive plants ===
The Yuma West Wetlands Park has been invaded by several introduced plant species, including the salt cedar tree (Tamarix ramosissima), giant reed (Arundo donax), Russian olive (Elaeagnus angustifolia), buffelgrass (Cenchrus ciliaris), and common mullein (Verbascum thapsus).

Salt cedar (Tamarix ramosissima) is particularly dangerous to the ecology of the West Wetlands Park due to the salt that is secreted through its leaves, increasing the salinity of the surface soil. Salt deposits created by salt cedar kill native vegetation and can harm animal species (e.g., Salt cedar communities support fewer native bird populations). The species grows very successfully along riparian zones and tends to completely replace all native vegetation. It absorbs water at an exponential rate; across the entirety of the Colorado River System, it is responsible for a daily absorption of 200 gallons of water.

Giant reed (Arundo donax), also known as wild cane, is an invasive species that has greatly compromised the lower Colorado River riparian zone. The United States Department of Agriculture describes it as a perennial grass that grows from nine to thirty feet in height. Successful establishment of giant reed within a riparian area results in a decline of native plant species. It does not provide shelter or food for the native wildlife species, and areas invaded by giant reed support little to no wildlife. It dominates river banks and does not shade the river edge, resulting in warmer water and a lower diversity of aquatic animals. Giant reed, along with salt cedar, have greatly devastated and degraded riparian habitats of the lower Colorado River.

Russian olive, buffelgrass, and common mullein are not as destructive as salt cedar, but these invasive plants can reproduce rapidly and outcompete native species.

=== Native plants ===
Native plant species located within the West Wetlands Park include cattail (Typha latifolia), arrowweed (Pluchea sericea), coyote willow (Salix exigua), four-wing saltbush (Atriplex canescens), quail bush (Atriplex lentiformis), and seep-willow (Baccharis salicifolia). Trees include cottonwood (Populus fremontii) Goodding's willow (Salix gooddingii), honey mesquite (Prosopis juliflora var. torreyana = v. Prosopis glandulosa), and screwbean mesquite (Prosopis pubescens).

== Animals ==
=== Mammals ===
The park hosts several native mammals, including beaver, cottontail rabbit, round-tailed ground squirrel and Botta's pocket gopher.

=== Birds ===
Burrowing owl

In 2006, the City of Yuma received funds for the "Yuma West Wetlands Burrowing Owl Habitat" project. The project established 20 artificial burrows for relocation of displaced owls, including a viewing platform to allow for public observation. Signage at either end of the habitat directs visitors to the location of the viewing platform. Artificial burrows consist of a series of PVC pipes protruding from the ground nestled amongst large sage bushes. The western burrowing owl (Athene cunicularia) is the only known owl that spends the majority of its life underground, including raising their young. Unlike most owls which are mainly nocturnal, burrowing owls are active during the day as well. Due to the significant time spent underground, construction projects have been detrimental to the owls and their habitats to such that the species is now Endangered in Canada, Threatened in Mexico, and considered to be a Species of Special Concern in Florida and much of the Western US. "Burrowing owls are not able to dig their own burrows, but create homes in existing underground spaces. Deserted squirrel burrows, kangaroo rat mounds, coyote, fox, skunk and badger dens provide homes for the owls". "They are covered in brown spotted feathers and have long legs. They also sport distinctive white "eyebrows" above bright yellow eyes".

Hummingbirds

The West Wetlands Park also contains a hummingbird garden named after former Yuma district Congressman, Ed Pastor, in appreciation of his efforts in supporting the restoration and funding of the riverfront parks projects. Signage includes four maps of North and South America showing the different migration patterns of the four common hummingbirds found in the garden. A separate sign describes specific plants, including perennial flowers designed to attract the four hummingbirds opposed to other pollinating insects. Informative text indicates that these hummingbirds prefer dense foliage, trees, shrubs, and vines that allow for easy perching. Arizona is home to 18 hummingbird species, four of which occur in the West Wetlands Park hummingbird garden, including Anna's hummingbird (Calypte anna), the black-chinned hummingbird (Archilochus alexandri), Costa's hummingbird (Calypte costae) and the rufous hummingbird (Selasphorus rufus).

==== Other birds ====
Wetland restoration efforts have resulted in a doubling of the bird population and a 75% increase in bird species diversity. Among the endangered and threatened species that have been sighted are: Yuma clapper rail (Rallus longirostris), southwestern willow flycatcher (Empidonax traillii) and western yellow-billed cuckoo (Coccyzus americanus).

The flagship species, the white-faced ibis, has been observed nesting and feeding in the West Wetlands. Other sightings of migratory species include great and snowy egrets, and long-billed Savannah sparrows. Additional birds seen during the winter include hooded and common mergansers (in years where there is sufficient water), green herons, sharp-shinned and Cooper's hawks, belted kingfishers, and black and Say's phoebes. Expected and seasonal residents include all of the western warblers, which can be seen during the summer: Wilson's warbler, yellow warbler, yellow-rumped warbler, orange-crowned warbler, hermit warbler, black-throated gray warblers, and yellow-breasted chat. The western kingbird, western wood pewee, olive-sided flycatcher, gray flycatcher, and ash-throated flycatcher may also be seen in the summer.

Year-round residents include greater roadrunners, Gambel's quail, ladder-backed and Gila woodpeckers, crissal thrashers, great-tailed grackle, verdins, black-tailed gnat-catche, common yellow-throat sparrows, and song sparrows.

Winter visitors include ospreys, blue-grey gnat-catchers, and Lincoln's sparrows.

Rare and unusual birds that have been seen in the area include northern parulas (fall 2012), red-naped and red-breasted hybrid sapsuckers (fall 2012), eastern phoebes (fall 2012), and summer tanagers (November 2012).

=== Reptiles ===
On the east side of the Yuma West Wetlands, large western diamondback rattlesnakes have been spotted.

=== Insects ===
Butterflies

West of the hummingbird garden is a butterfly habitat filled with mostly yellow and orange flowering bushes and scattered trees. The following butterflies are common:

The giant swallowtail (Papilio cresphontes), the monarch butterfly (Danaus plexippus), the queen butterfly (Danaus gilippus), the western pygmy blue butterfly (Brephidium exilis) or (Brephidium exile), the orange sulphur butterfly (Colias), the painted lady butterfly (Vanessa cardui), the fiery skipper butterfly (Hylephila phyleus), the funereal duskywing butterfly (Erynnis funeralis), and the snout butterfly (Libytheinae).

== Habitats ==
West Wetlands Park includes the following natural and man-made habitats: Hummingbird Garden, Burrowing Owls, Butterfly Garden, Willow Fly Catcher Nesting Habitat, Millennium Grove, Beaver Pond, Lower Bench, and Cactus garden.

=== Habitat restoration ===
Out of the 110 acres of the West Wetlands Park, approximately 30 percent is restored riparian habitat, known as the "Lower Bench". Prior to restoration, this area was deteriorated and overrun with trash and invasive vegetation, in particular salt cedar and giant reeds.

Large expanses of non-native species were bulldozed from the area, and others were manually hoed out. Brush hogs, masticators, and chemical herbicides continue to be used to keep the invasive species under control. Consistent maintenance is needed to eradicate the constantly growing giant reed.

== Geology and hydrology ==
As result of the Arizona v. California water dispute, the Yuma Area Office of the Geology and Groundwater Team of the Bureau of Reclamation, Yuma Area Office, in partnership with the US Geological Survey, completed geological investigations of the West Wetlands Park in 1970 and 1971.

Geologic boring, via the "Piezometer Yuma Area Logs" show that the underlying area of the West Wetlands Park consisted of approximately 12 to 17 feet of "garbage" from the previous landfill site. Below the garbage there is about 80 feet of river deposited silt, sand and clay, which is consistent with the sediments found commonly in areas that are near deltaic and riparian environments. At about 100 feet depth, the top of the coarse-gravel zone is encountered, which is the most important water-producing aquifer in the Yuma area.
