= Quito Botanical Garden =

Botanical garden and park in Ecuador

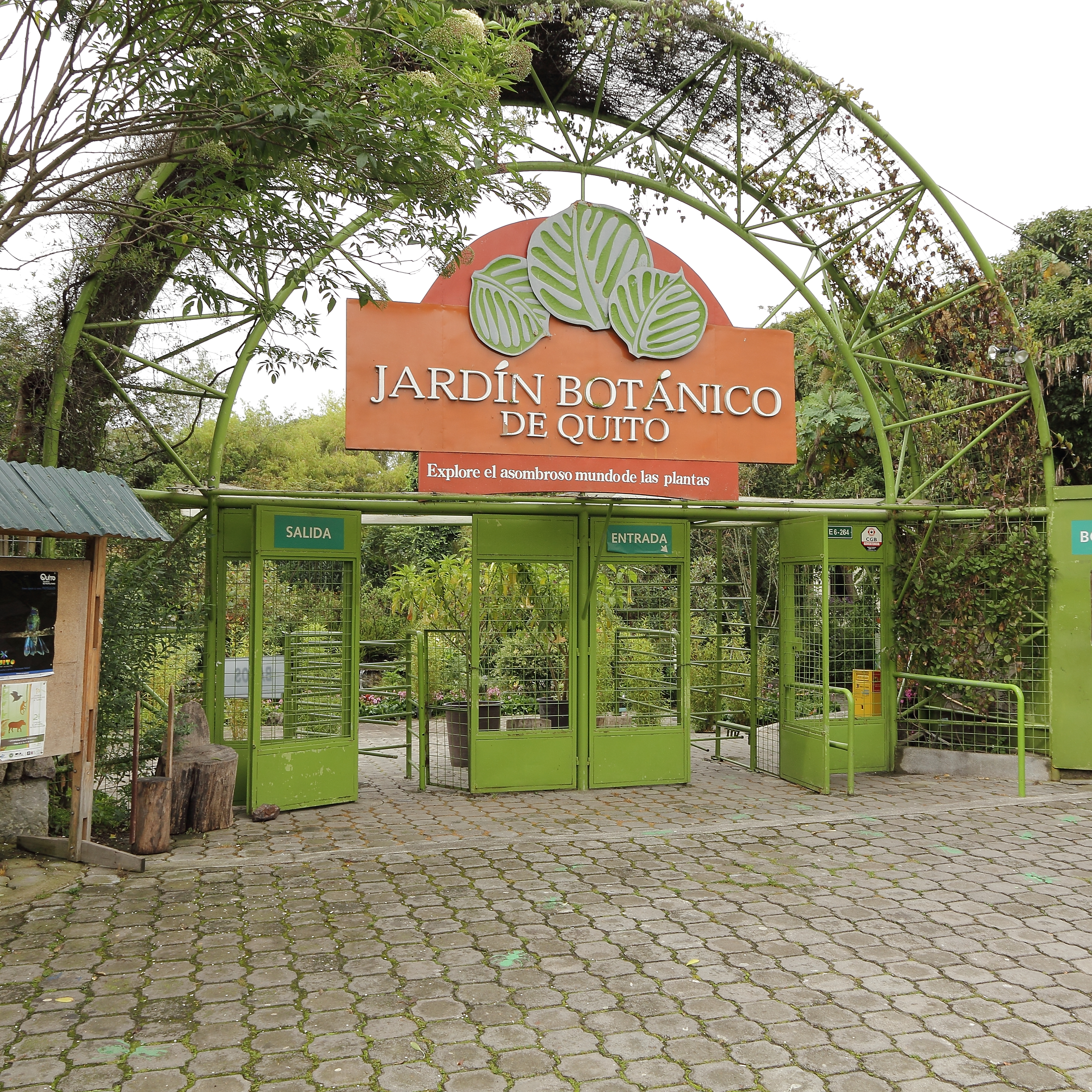
- Entrance of the Quito Botanical Garden
- Interactive map of Quito Botanical Garden
- Type: Park, botanical garden, arboretum and greenhouses.
- Location: Quito, Ecuador
- Coordinates: 0°11′10.23″S 78°29′6.4″W
- Area: circa 18,600 square metres (1.86 ha)
- Created: 1992
- Operator: Botanical Foundation of the Andes; Quito City Hall.
- Open: Yes
- Website: www.jardinbotanicoquito.com

Quito Botanical Garden (Spanish: Jardín Botánico de Quito) is a park, botanical garden, arboretum and greenhouse of 18,600 square meters in the city of Quito, Ecuador. It houses species of plants of the country (Ecuador is among the 17 richest countries in the world in native botanical species, an updated study on the classified Ecuadorian flora determined the existence of 17,000 species).

The identification code of the Botanical Garden Quito as a member of the Botanic Gardens Conservation International (BGCI), as well as the initials of its herbarium, is QUITO.

== History ==
This botanical garden arises in 1989, thanks to an agreement signed between the "Ecuadorian Museum of Natural Sciences", the "Gardening Club" and the "Municipality of Quito" by which it became the old Nursery municipal of the Parque de la Carolina, in a botanical garden.

To guarantee the administrative efficiency of this entity, the creation of the "Botanical Foundation of the Andes" was managed in June 1991, whose mission is to manage and carry out direct actions for the knowledge, protection and conservation of Ecuadorian flora.

Quito Botanical Garden
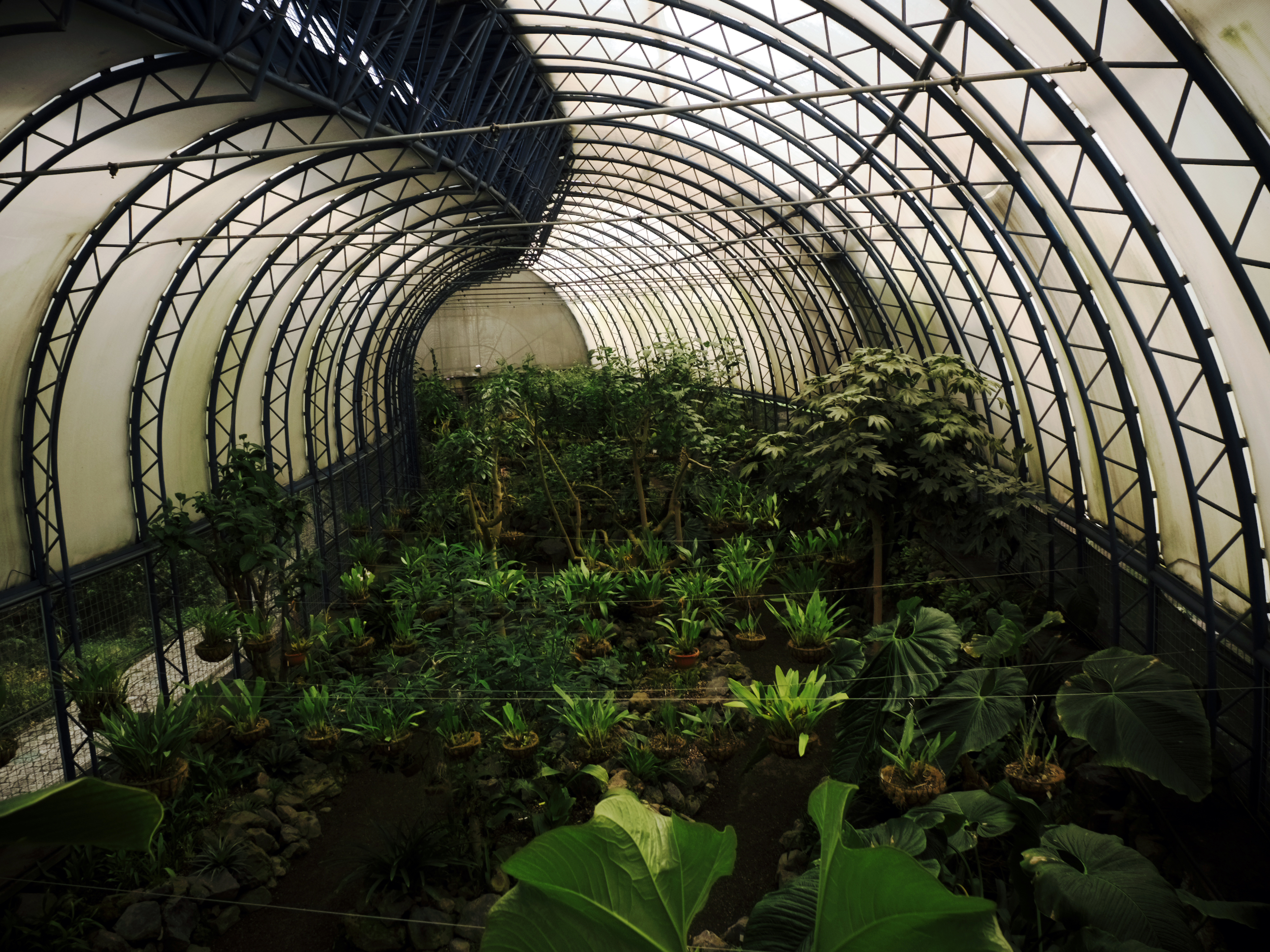
Orchid garden (Orquideario)

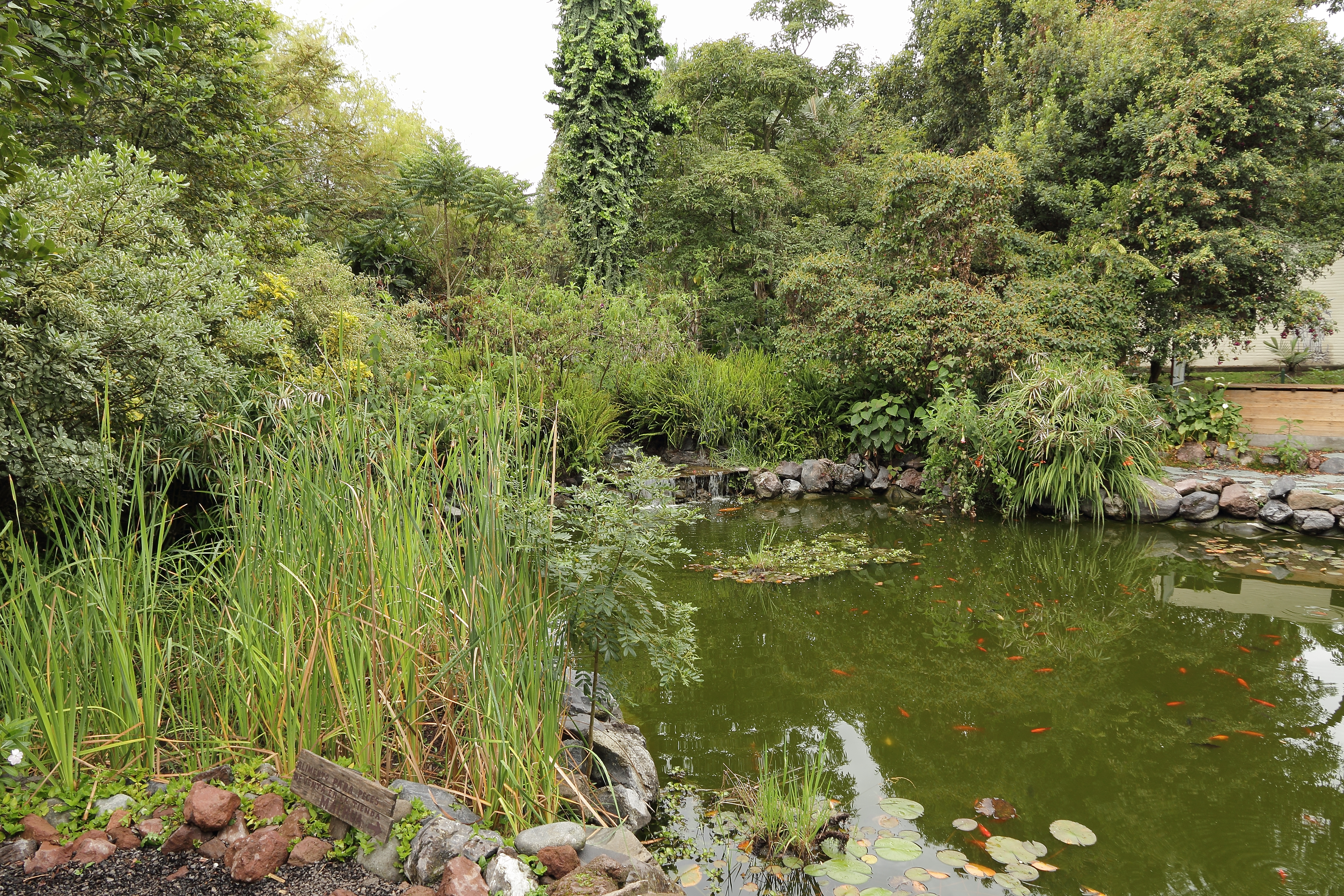
Lagoon in the botanical garden

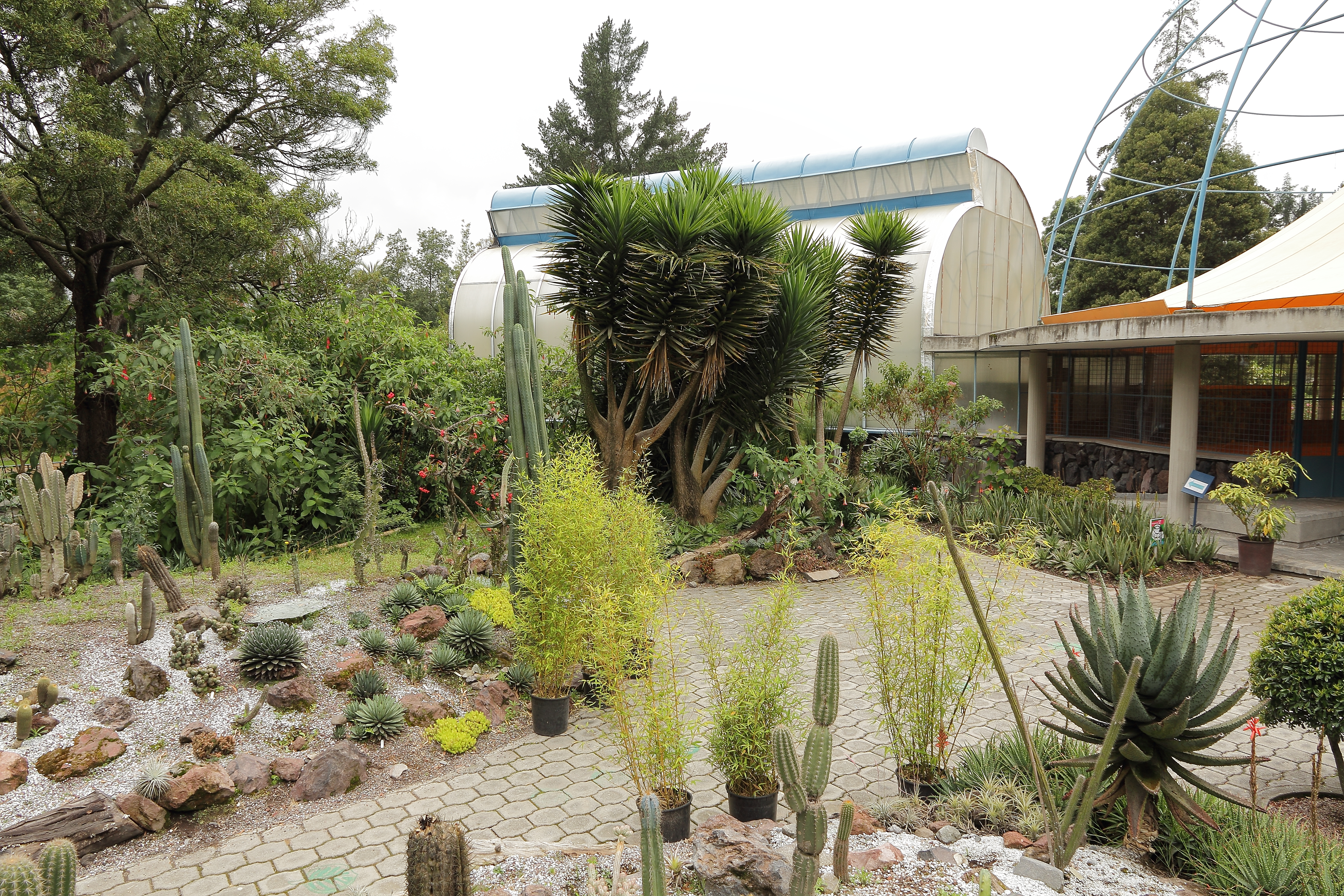
Cactus garden (Cactarium)

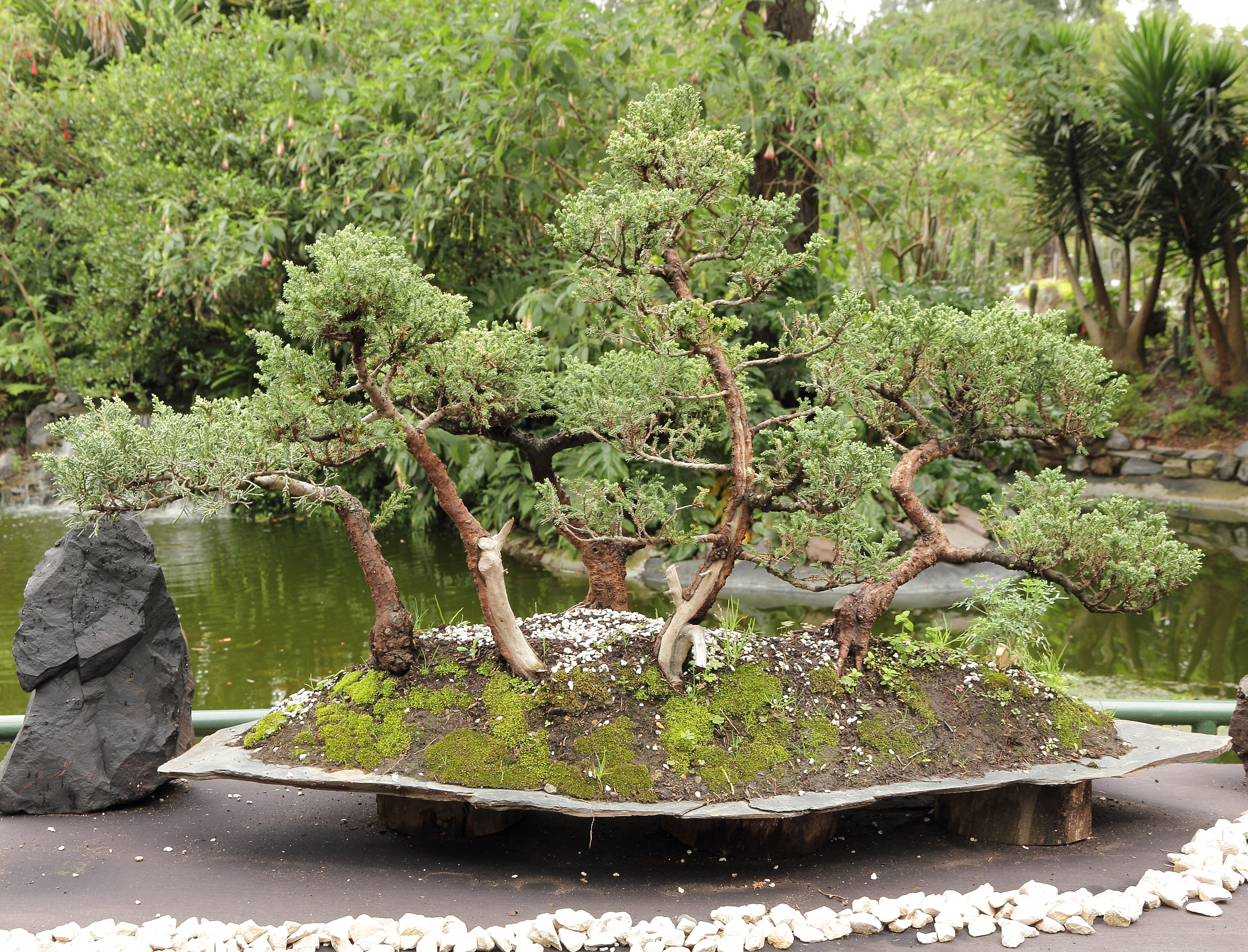
Collection of Bonsais

== Collections ==
Numerous species of plants, both Ecuadorian and from other countries, together with some species of birds, and where the water runs abundantly through streams and waterfalls. Among its collections that are distributed along walking paths:

- Aquatic plants,
- Cloud forest,
- Páramo plants, such as the "paramo pads", which invite you to lie down on those soft green mattresses, but beware, they are pads full of water.
- Orchid garden arranged in two greenhouses, where tall orchids and tropical orchids are housed. In these are the orchids arranged on the stones, the ground or in tree trunks, just as it happens in nature.
- Medicinal plants, such as guanto or floripondio (Brugmansia), a species known as the flower of the Inca and which was believed to scare away evil spirits, the husk or Cinchona officinalis, the remedy for malaria.
- Native and introduced fruit trees, in a project that will be planned in agreement with the schools in the area.
- Greenhouse hydroponic of roses, it is still in the project for the near future.
Specimens

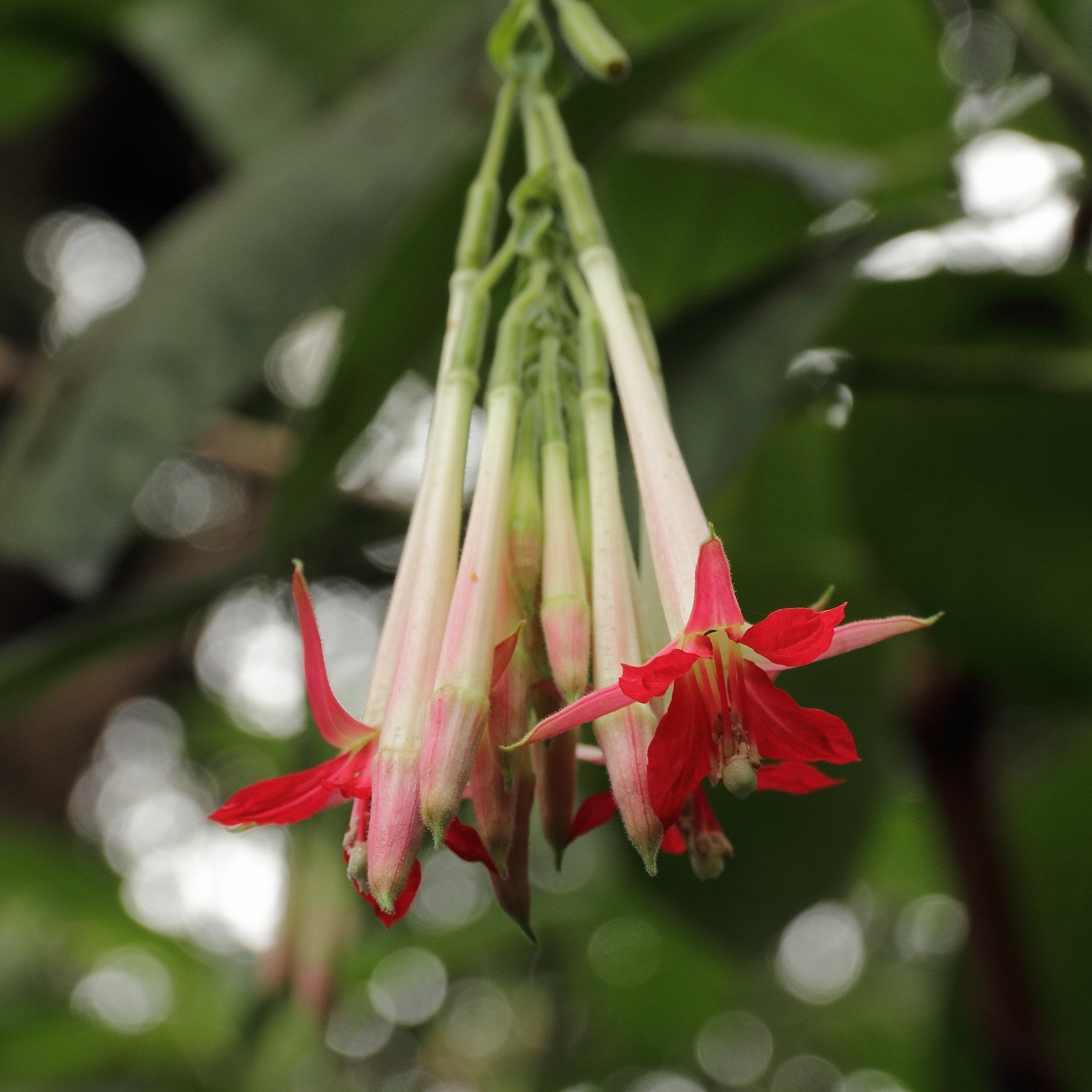
Fuchsia boliviana Alba

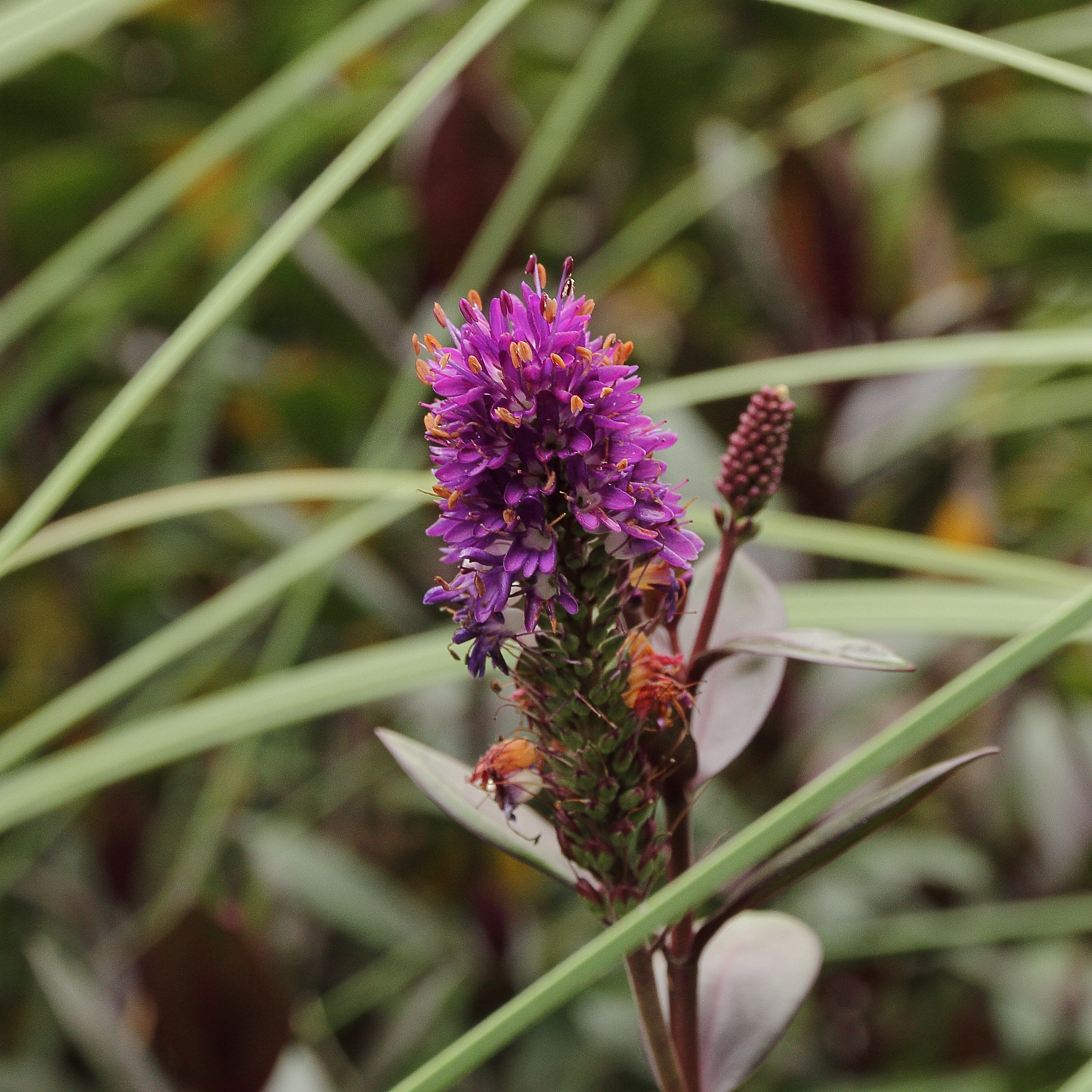

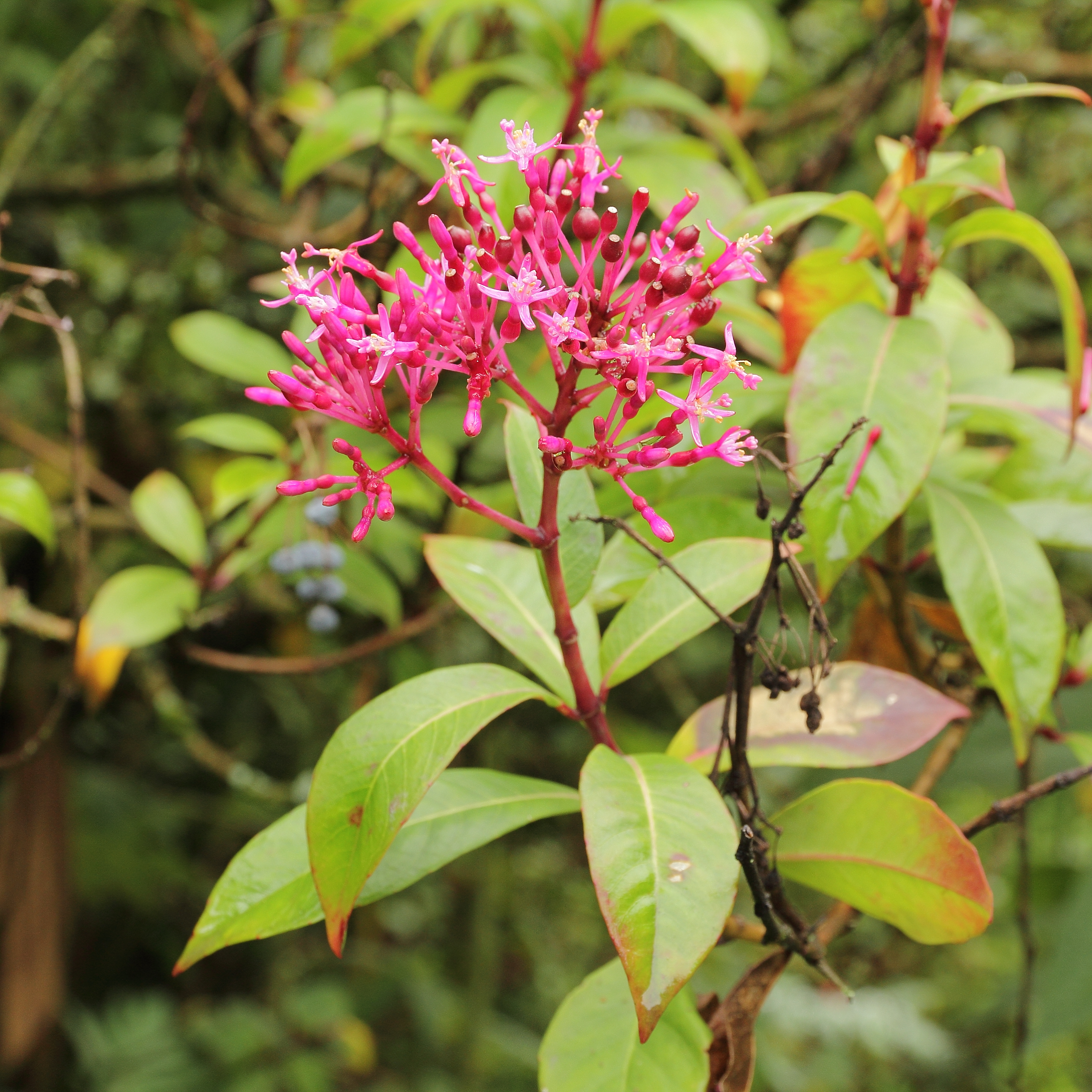
Fuchsia paniculata

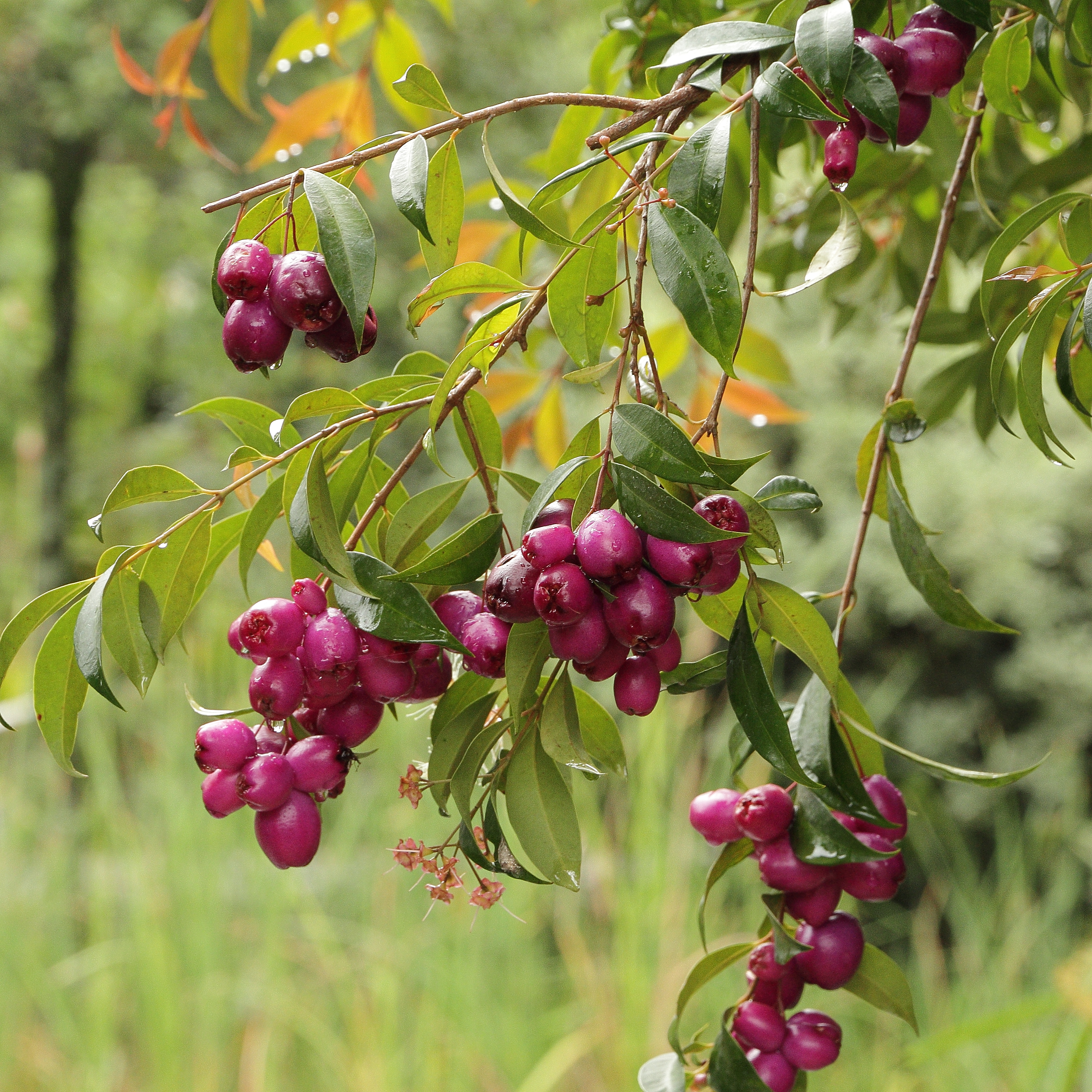
Syzygium jambos

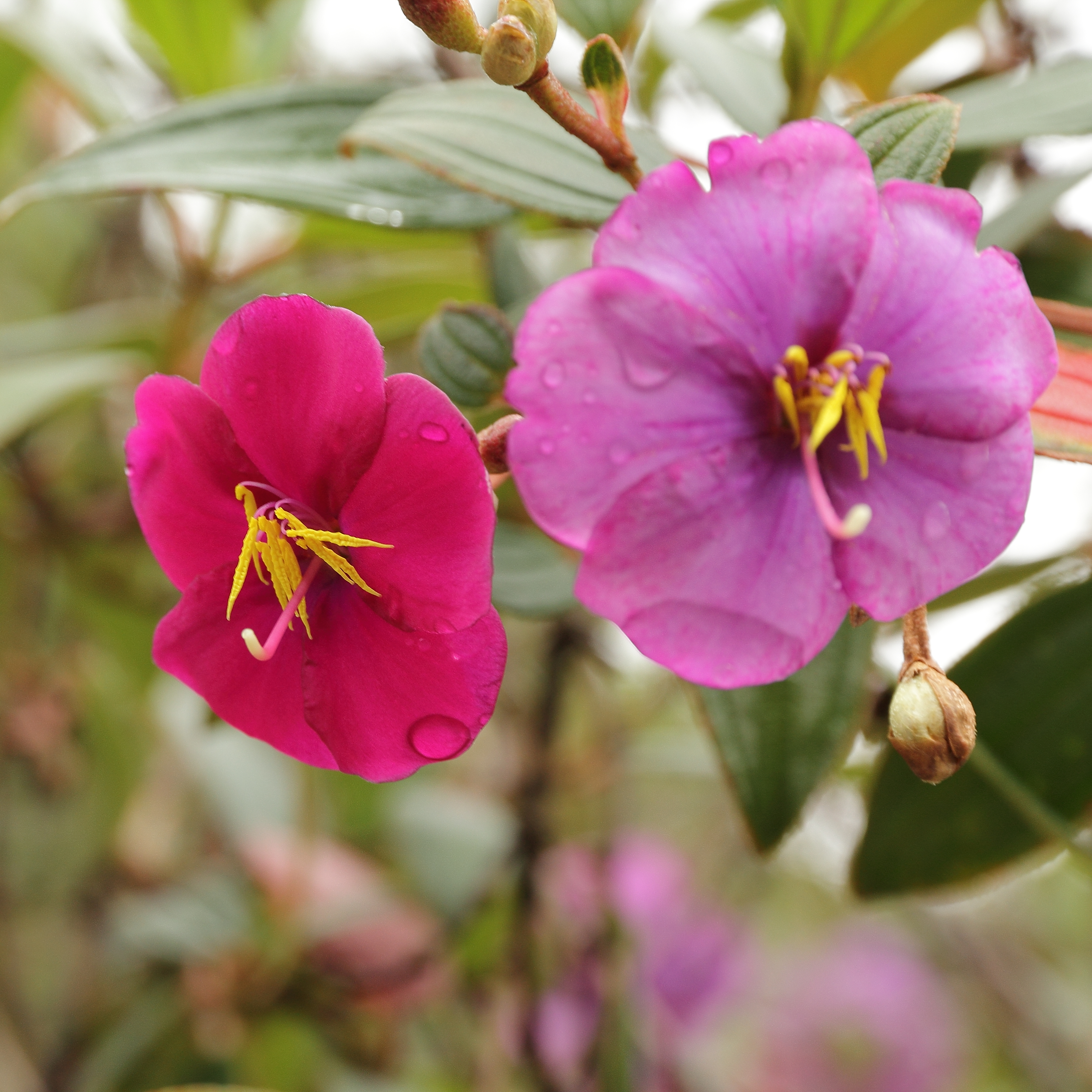
Andesanthus lepidotus, syn. Tibouchina lepidota

== Climate ==
The climate of the city corresponds to the subtropical highland climate; Quito is divided into 3 zones; south, center, and north; where the south is the coldest place in the city because it is the highest area, the center is hot; where the highest temperatures always occur, and the north is temperate. Quito's climate is divided into 2 seasons or stages; winter with a prolonged rainy season and a four-month dry season where the highest temperatures occur. Quito always has a temperate climate with temperatures ranging from 10º to 27 °C.

== Location ==
It is located on Rumipamba Street and Av. Río Amazonas, in the "Parque La Carolina", located near an important commercial area of Quito, and next to the "Museum of Natural Sciences". Quito, Ecuador. Quito Botanical Garden Passage # 34, Rumipamba E6-264 and Av Shirys, Interior of Parque La Carolina, Quito, Ecuador. Visiting hours are Monday from 8 a.m. to 5 p.m. and every Sunday and holidays from 9 a.m. to 5 p.m.

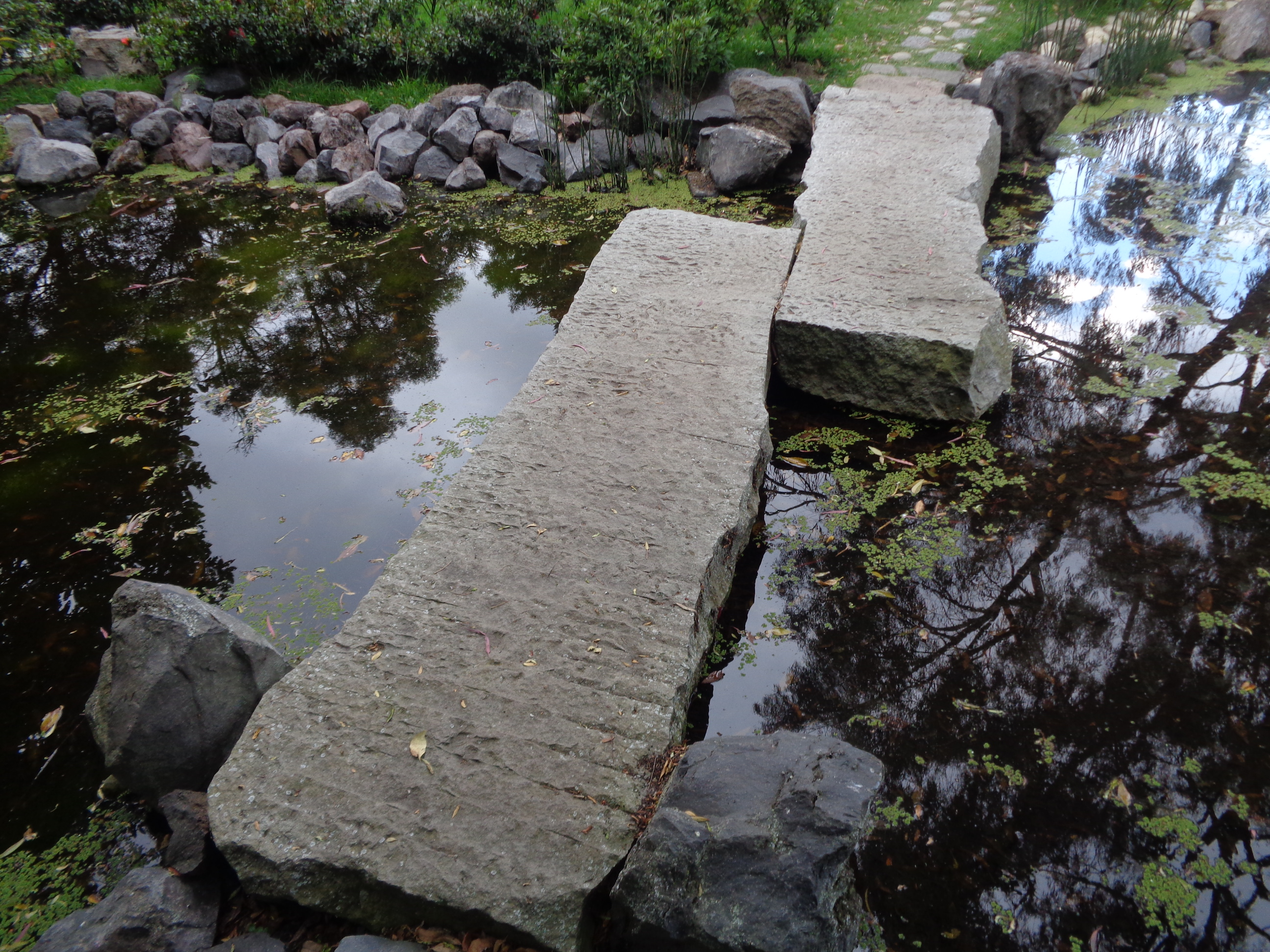
A zig-zag bridge across a small pond at the Quito Botanical Garden

== Bibliography ==
- Dodson, C.H. & FROM. Bennett. 1989. Orchids of Peru. Icon. Pl. Trop. Series II. Fascicle 1–2: 1–200.
- Dodson, C.H. & P.M. Dodson. 1984. Orchids of Ecuador. Icon. Pl. Trop. 10: 901–1000.
- Dodson, C.H. & R. Escobar Restrepo. 1994. AA-Dracula. 1: 11–207. In C.H. Dodson & R. Escobar Restrepo Nat. Ecuad. Orch .. Editorial Colina, Medellín.
- Jørgensen, P. M. & C. Ulloa Ulloa. 1994. Seed plants of the high Andes of Ecuador --- A checklist. AAU Rep. 34: 1–443.
- Jørgensen, P. M. & S. León-Yánez. (eds.) 1999. Catalog of the vascular plants of Ecuador. Monogr. Syst. Bot. Missouri Bot. Gard. 75: i – viii, 1–1181.
- Williams, N. H. 1972. A reconsideration of Ada and the glumaceous Brassias (Orchidaceae). Brittonia 24 (1): 93–110.
