= La Puntilla, Tinogasta =

Coordinates: 28°08′S 67°30′W

La Puntilla (Tinogasta)
- Municipality and village
- Interactive map of La Puntilla (Tinogasta)
- Country: Argentina
- Province: Catamarca Province
- Time zone: UTC−3 (ART)

La Puntilla (Tinogasta) is a village and municipality in Catamarca Province in northwestern Argentina.
