= Miranda, La Rioja =

Coordinates: 29°20′S 67°41′W

Miranda (La Rioja)
- Municipality and village
- Interactive map of Miranda (La Rioja)
- Country: Argentina
- Province: La Rioja Province
- Time zone: UTC−3 (ART)

Miranda (La Rioja) is a municipality and village in La Rioja Province in northwestern Argentina.
