= Kapiʻolani Community College Cactus Garden =

Botanical garden in Honolulu, Hawaiʻi

Coordinates: 21.2696956°N 157.8012534°W

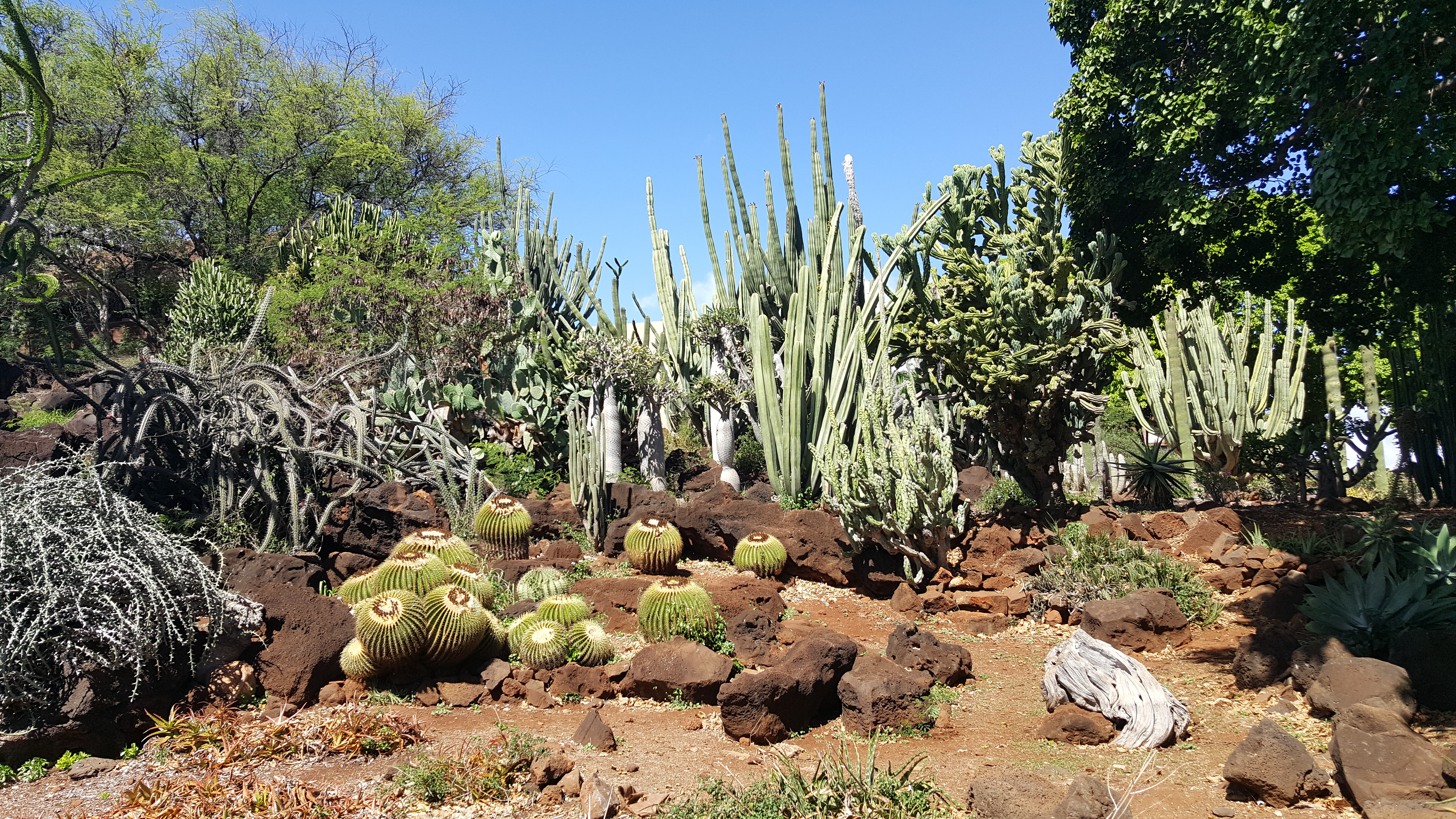
- Interactive map of Kapiʻolani Community College Cactus Garden

The Kapiʻolani Community College Cactus Garden is a small botanical garden specializing in cactus. It is located on the Kapiʻolani Community College campus, near Parking Lot C, at 4303 Diamond Head Road, Honolulu, Hawaiʻi. The garden was created by Moriso Teraoka in 1988.

== See also ==
- List of botanical gardens in the United States
