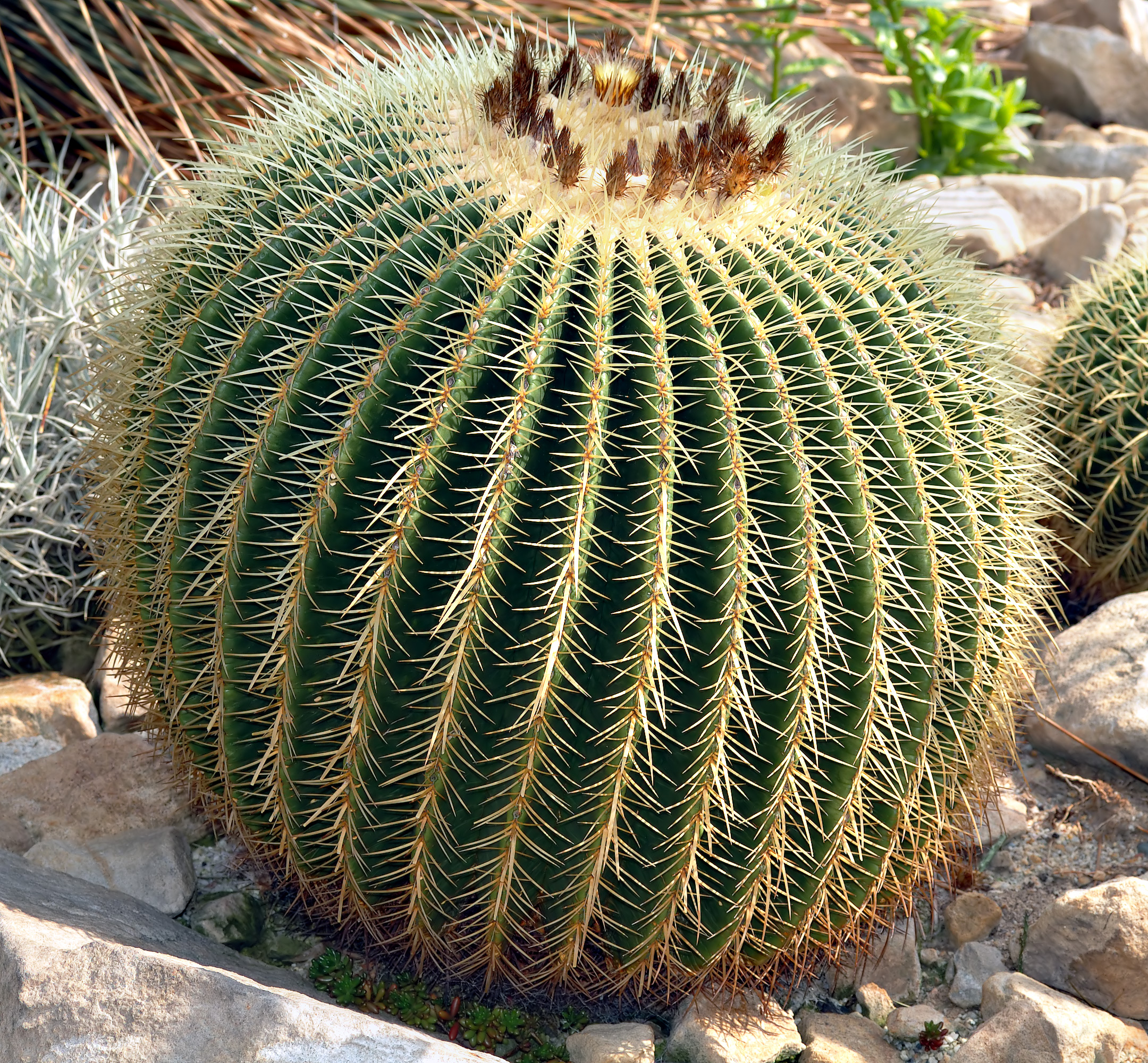
- Echinocactus grusonii in a cactus collection

Conservation status
- Endangered (IUCN 3.1)

Scientific classification
- Kingdom: Plantae
- Clade: Tracheophytes
- Clade: Angiosperms
- Clade: Eudicots
- Order: Caryophyllales
- Family: Cactaceae
- Subfamily: Cactoideae
- Genus: Kroenleinia; Lodé
- Species: K. grusonii

Binomial name
- Kroenleinia grusonii (Hildm.) Lodé

Synonyms
- Echinocactus grusonii Hildm.; Echinocereus grusonii (Hildm.) Von Zeisold; Ferocactus grusonii (Hildm.) Guiggi; Echinocactus corynacanthus Scheidw.; Echinocactus galeottii Scheidw.

= Kroenleinia grusonii =

Species of cactus

Kroenleinia grusonii, popularly known as the golden barrel cactus, golden ball, "mother-in-law's cushion" or "mother-in-law's chair", is a species of barrel cactus which is endemic to east-central Mexico.

== Description ==
Growing as a large, roughly spherical-globular and generally solitary (although basal shoots may sprout from adult specimens), K. grusonii may eventually reach over 1 metre (3.3 ft) in height, after many years, with a diameter of 40 to 80 centimeters (around 2–3 feet across). The lifespan of a single generation is estimated at 10–30 years. Younger plants do not look similar to mature specimens, with more green tissue visible and lighter-colored spines.

There may be up to 21–35 pronounced ribs on mature plants, though they are not evident in young plants, which may have a knobbly appearance. The areoles are yellow and somewhat woolly when the plant is young, then whitish, and finally, greyish. The sharp spines are long, straight or slightly recurved, and various shades of yellow or, occasionally, white or beige. Spines are quite large, somewhat textured (though not serrated) and are 1 or 2 cm (up to 1") apart from each other. The radial spines are arranged evenly, numbering between 8 and 10, and measure more than 3 cm (1.2 in) in length. The central spines numbering between 3 and 5, and measure about 5 cm (nearly 2"). They are strong, striated and fairly straight, although the central ones may be slightly curved downwards.

Puffy yellow flowers appear in summer at the top, around the crown, of the plant, but only after many years. They are 4 to 6 centimeters (up to 2.5") long and 3 to 5 centimeters (1.2 to 2.0 in) in diameter. The flowers only appear on older specimens and last for three days. The spherical, somewhat elongated, edible yellowish-greenish fruits are covered with white wool. They are 1.2 to 2 centimeters long and contain smooth, shiny brown seeds. If left undisturbed, flowers eventually become pollinated by nectivorous bats, bees and lepidopterans, and dry into seed pods to be wind- or animal-dispersed.

== Distribution ==
The golden barrel cactus is rare and endangered—potentially regionally extinct—in nature. It is native to the Mexican states of Querétaro and Hidalgo, particularly near Mesa de León. Wild populations of K. grusonii were adversely affected in the 1990s as a result of wild specimens being poached as well as the creation of the Zimapán Dam and reservoir (in Hidalgo). The golden barrel cactus is a fairly adaptable species, but naturally prefers growing in rich, volcanic (but well-aerated) soil on sunny slopes, where water quickly flees from its roots. The species may be found growing at altitudes as high as 1,400 metres (4,600 ft) above sea level.

== Taxonomy ==
Kroenleinia grusonii was originally placed in the small genus Echinocactus, which, together with the related genus Ferocactus, are collectively referred to as ball or barrel cacti, and occasionally as fish-hook cacti. The species was first described by German plantsman Heinrich Hildmann in 1891, and was named for German industrialist and cacti-collector Hermann Gruson. While sometimes referred to as 'golden ball', this species is not to be confused with the "other" golden ball, Parodia leninghausii, which has fuzzy, harmless spines and is native to Brazil and Paraguay.

Recent phylogenetic studies have found that Echinocactus grusonii is probably polyphyletic, with respect to the rest of Echinocactus, and is likely a result of hybridization between Echinocactus and Ferocactus. To correct this, Echinocactus grusonii was moved to its own genus, and, under this scheme, the new species name became Kroenleinia grusonii Lodé. However, thus far, not all authorities have accepted this change.

== Cultivation ==
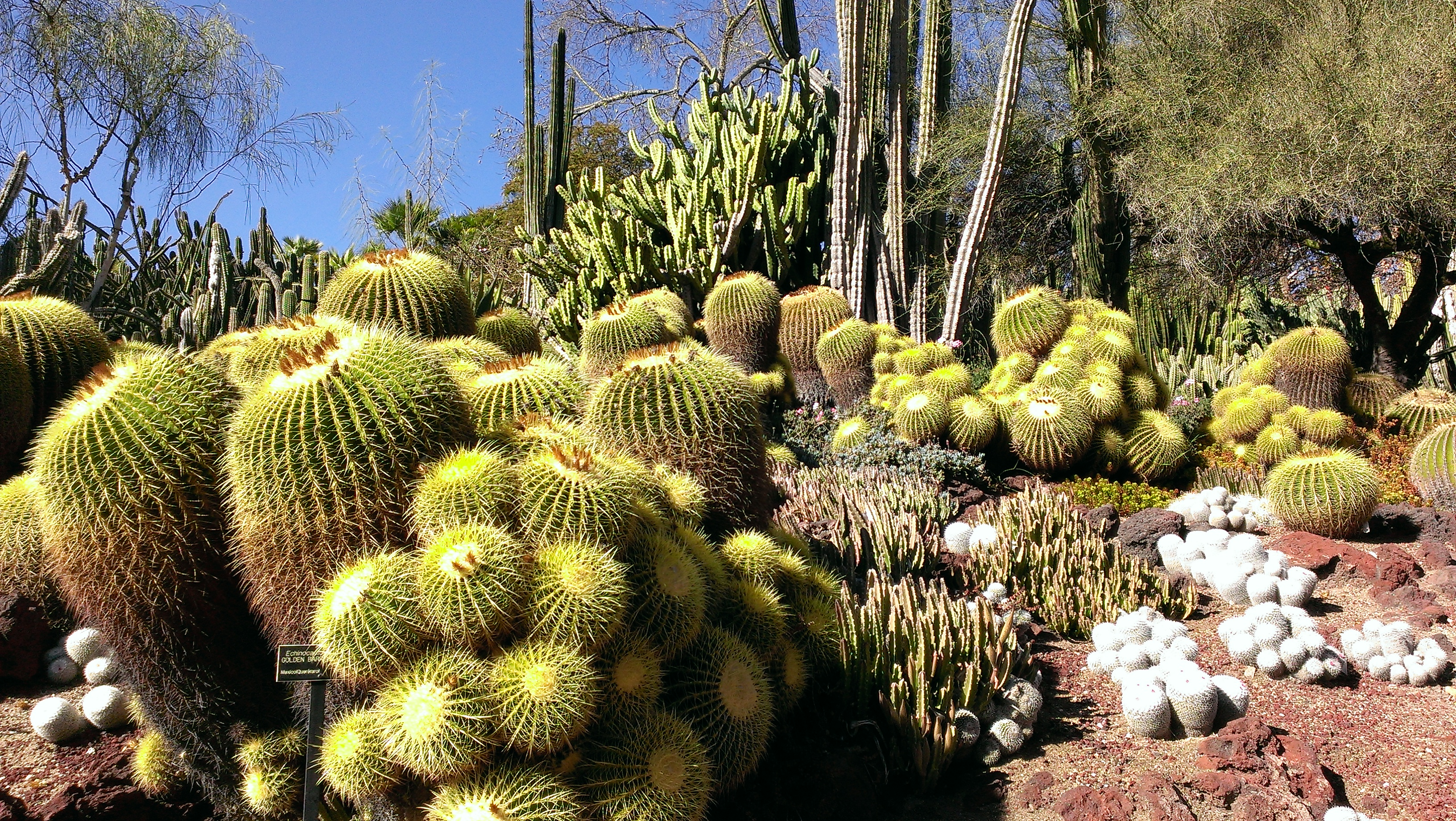
Golden barrel cacti at the Huntington

Kroenleinia grusonii is widely cultivated by specialty plant nurseries as an ornamental plant, for planting in containers, desert habitat gardens, rock gardens, and in conservatories. A white-spined and a short-spined form, as well as a teal-blue cultivar ('Blue barrel'), are also in-cultivation.

The golden barrel is among the most popular cacti in collections and in landscaping, and has increasingly become popular as an architectural accent plant in contemporary garden designs.

The golden barrel cactus is considered one of the easiest to care for, and is a relatively fast grower in warmer climates, around the world. The plants do have some basic requirements: an average minimum winter temperature of 12 °C (54 °F) (though they can tolerate brief periods of lower temperatures if provided with adequate cover and frost protection), with good drainage being the key factor. As with most succulents, the golden barrel survives with less water in winter; in nature, it is found on elevated, angled slopes, where precipitation and runoff quickly washes over the roots and leaves the plant; pooling water quickly leads to root rot and eventual death of the entire plant. In some climates, the species is hardy to about −8 °C (18 °F) for brief periods.

Despite being endangered and locally-extinct in its native Central Mexico, K. grusonii may be found in many countries, on several continents, in both non-native wild populations and private and public gardens. It is particularly popular in the collections of desert plants within botanical gardens, where it is often successfully bred and propagated. In the UK, the golden barrel cactus has gained the Royal Horticultural Society's Award of Garden Merit. In the Americas, it is found in various locations, from Mexico south through Chile, and notably throughout the American Southwest and the U.S. West Coast. It is also found on several Caribbean islands. In Europe, it is found nearly everywhere around the Mediterranean Sea and the Levant, the Middle East, to South Asia, South Africa and Australia, among other locations.

== Gallery ==
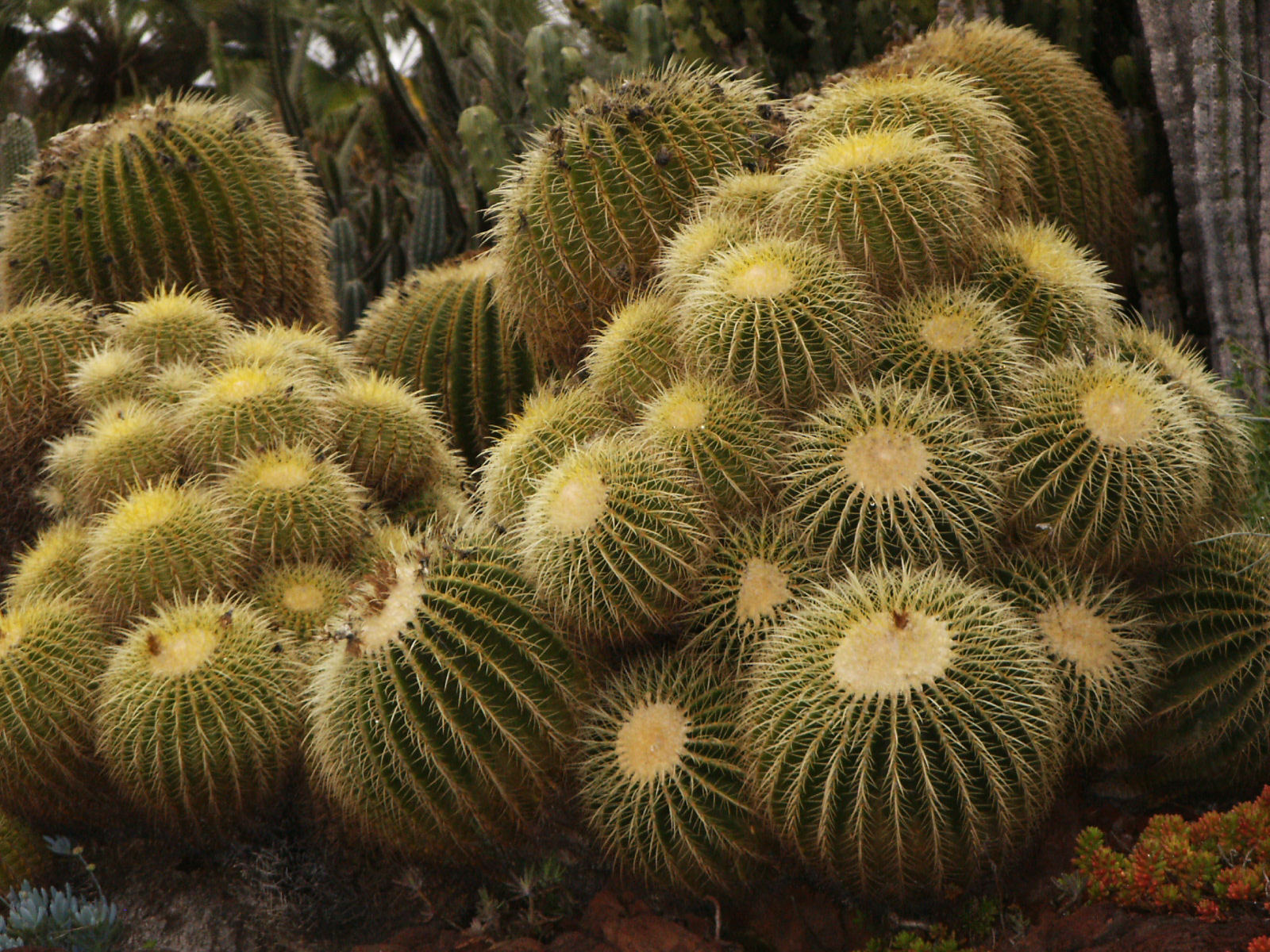
Mature golden barrels showing their distinctive clustering habit. Photo from the Huntington Desert Garden in California.

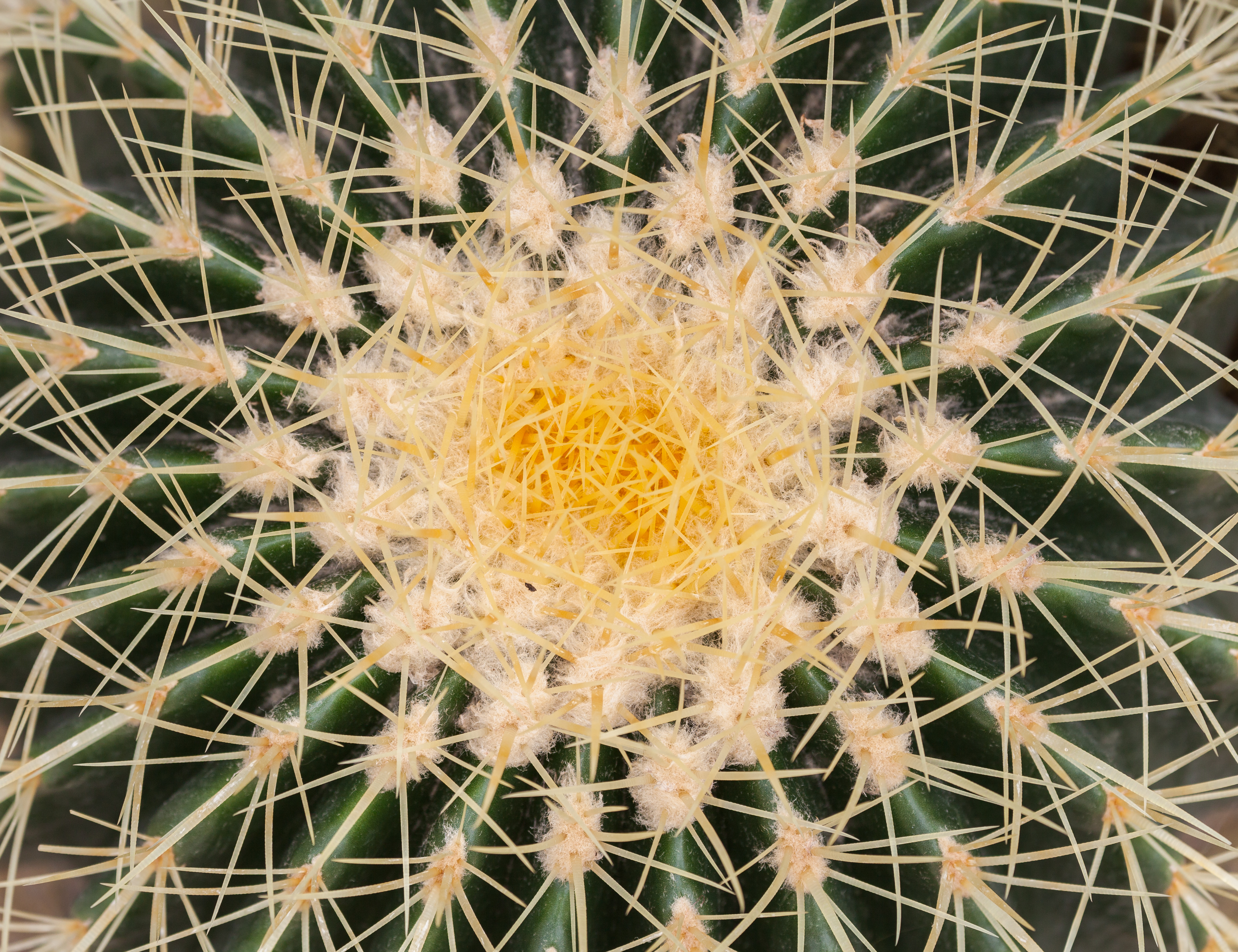
Closeup of the top

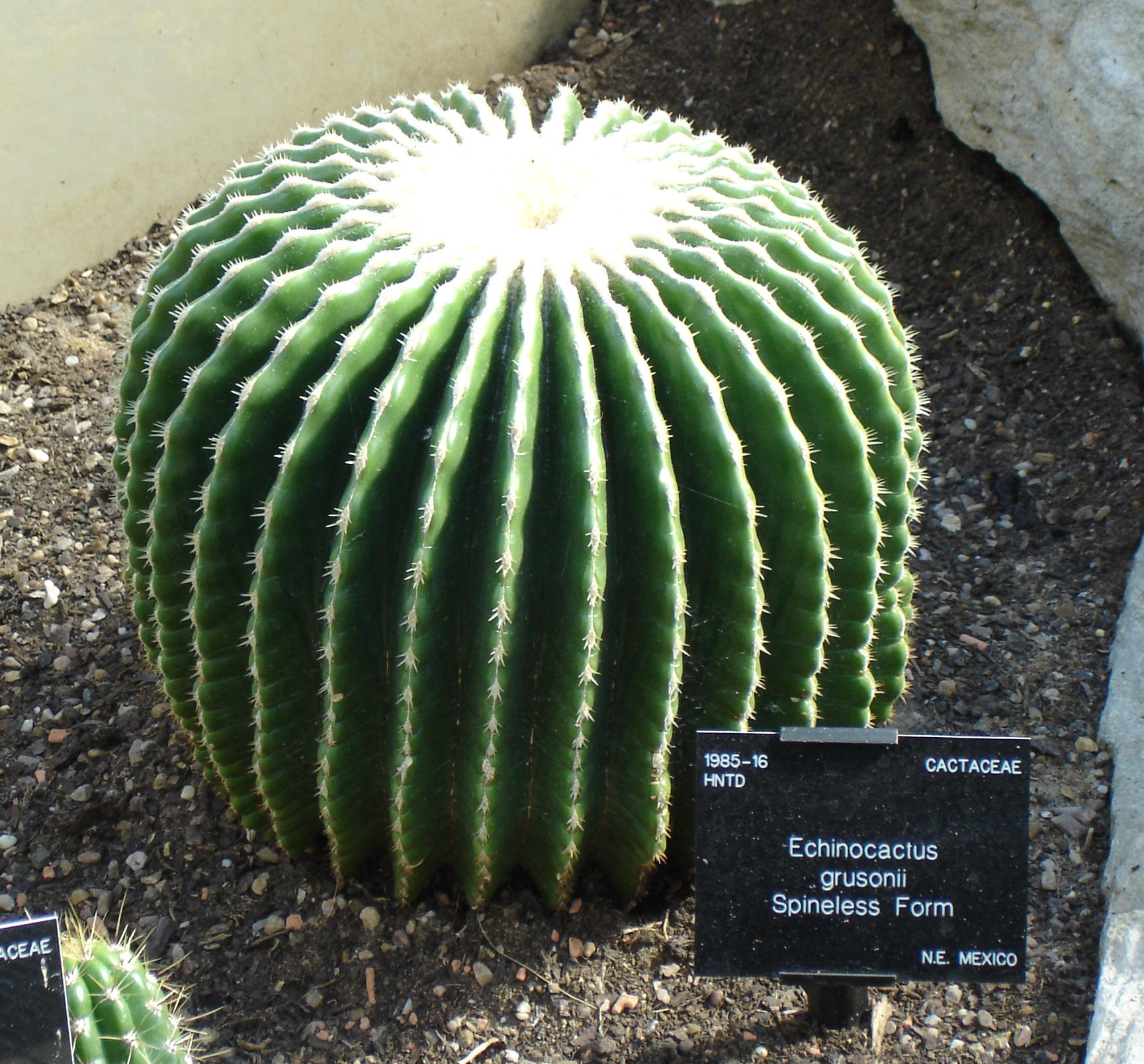
Kroenleinia, a nearly spineless form

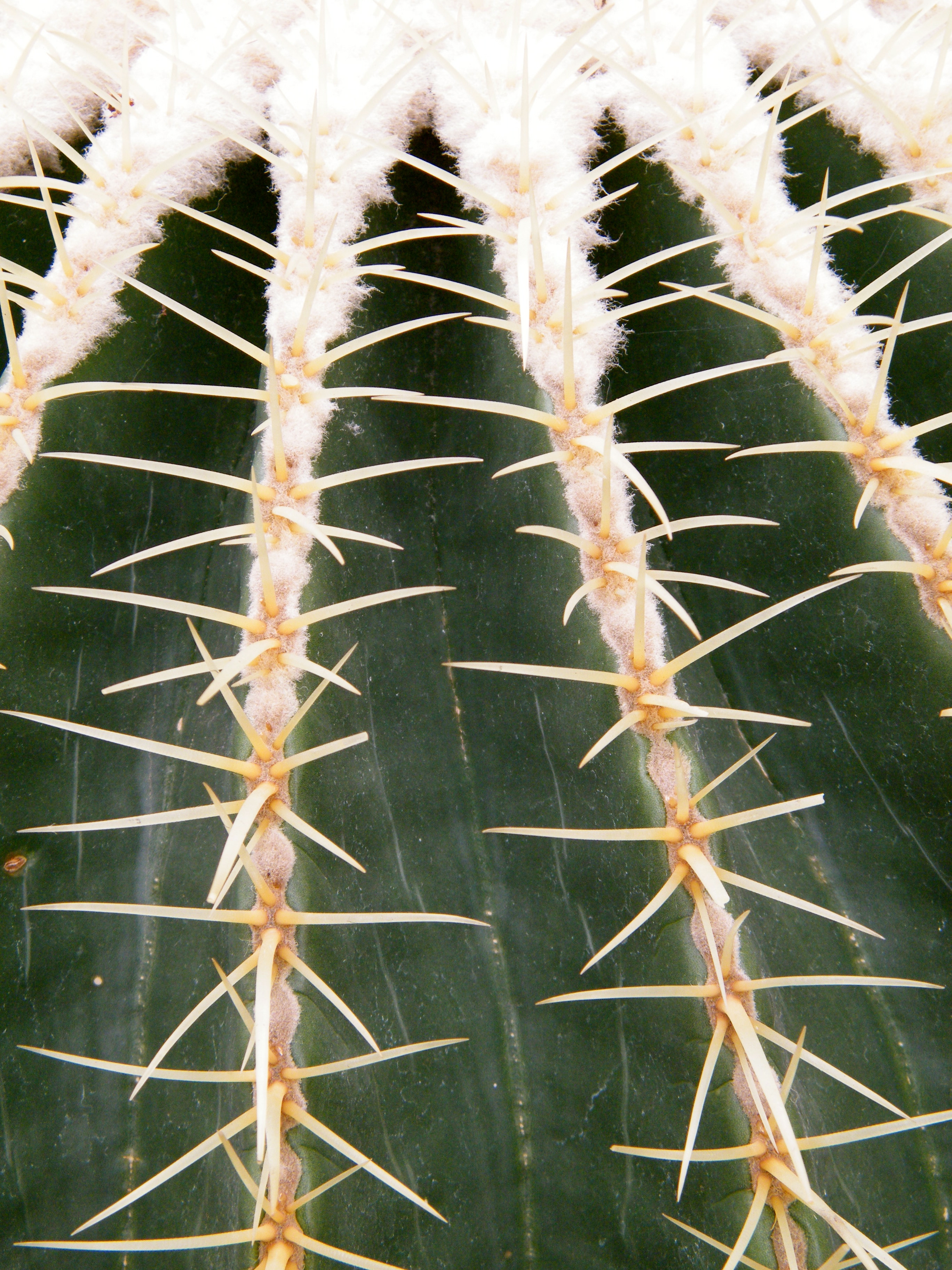
Kroenleinia grusonii spine detail at the United States Botanic Gardens

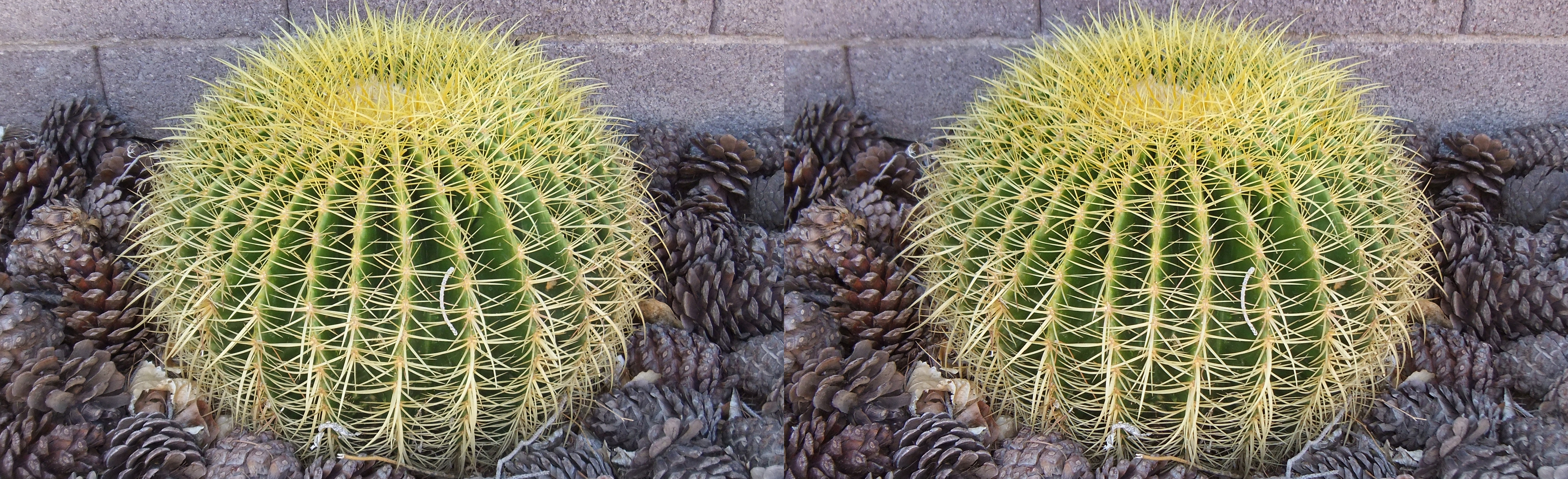
Stereoscopic crossview of a golden barrel cactus

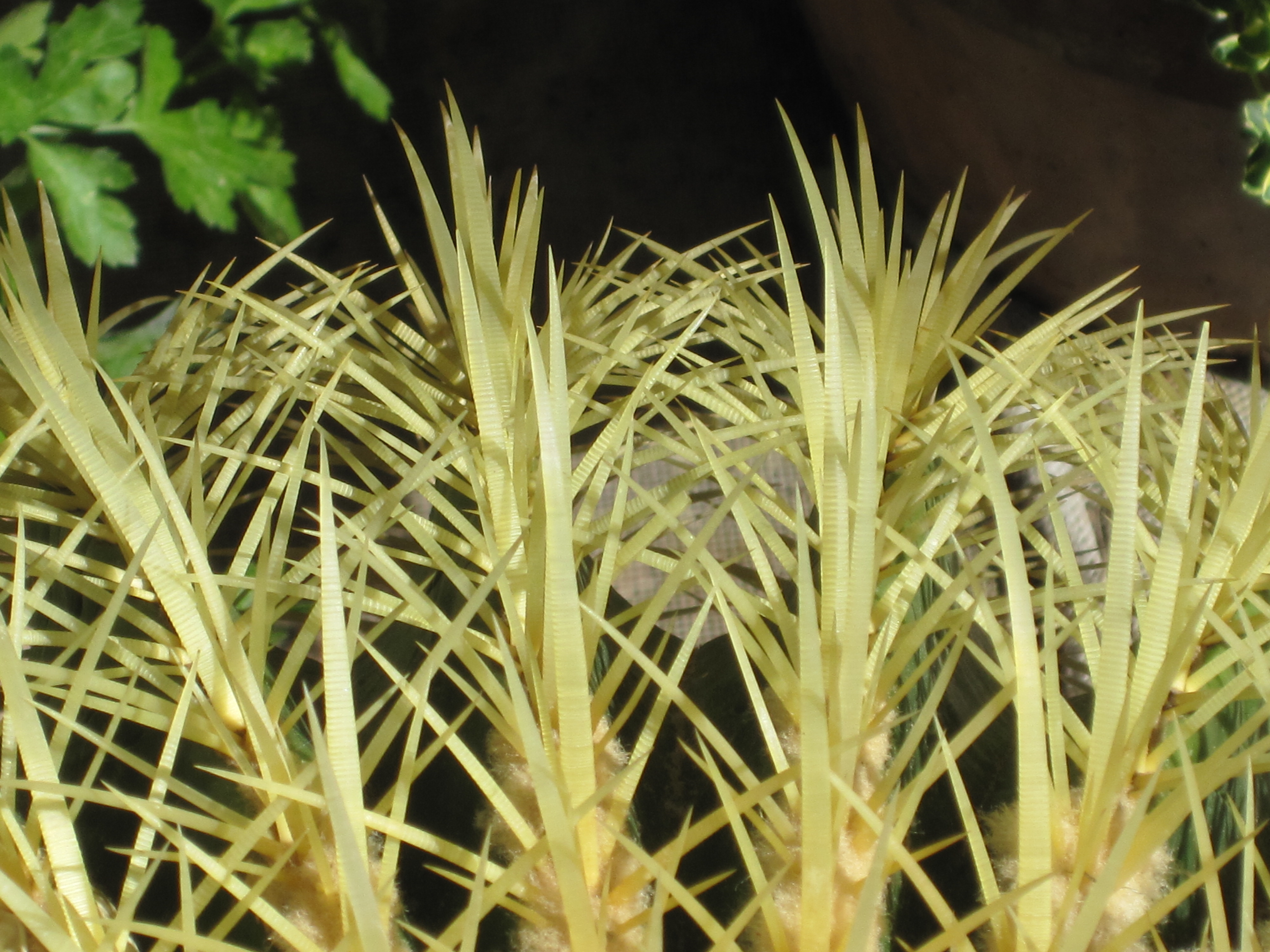
Spine detail

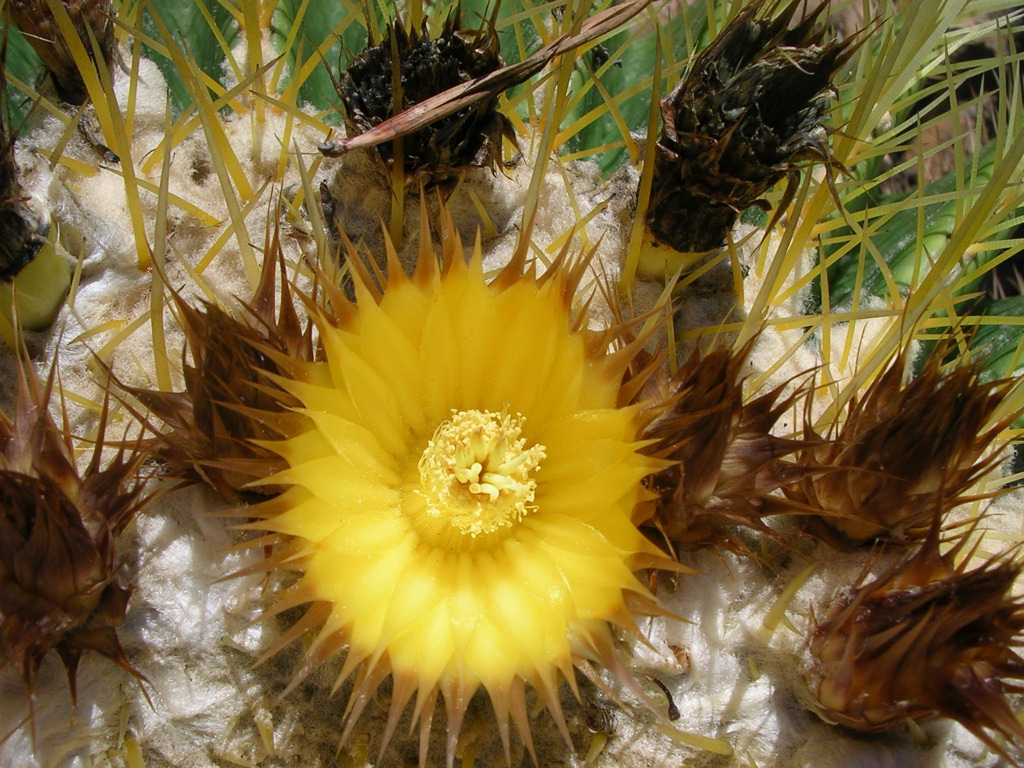
Flower detail

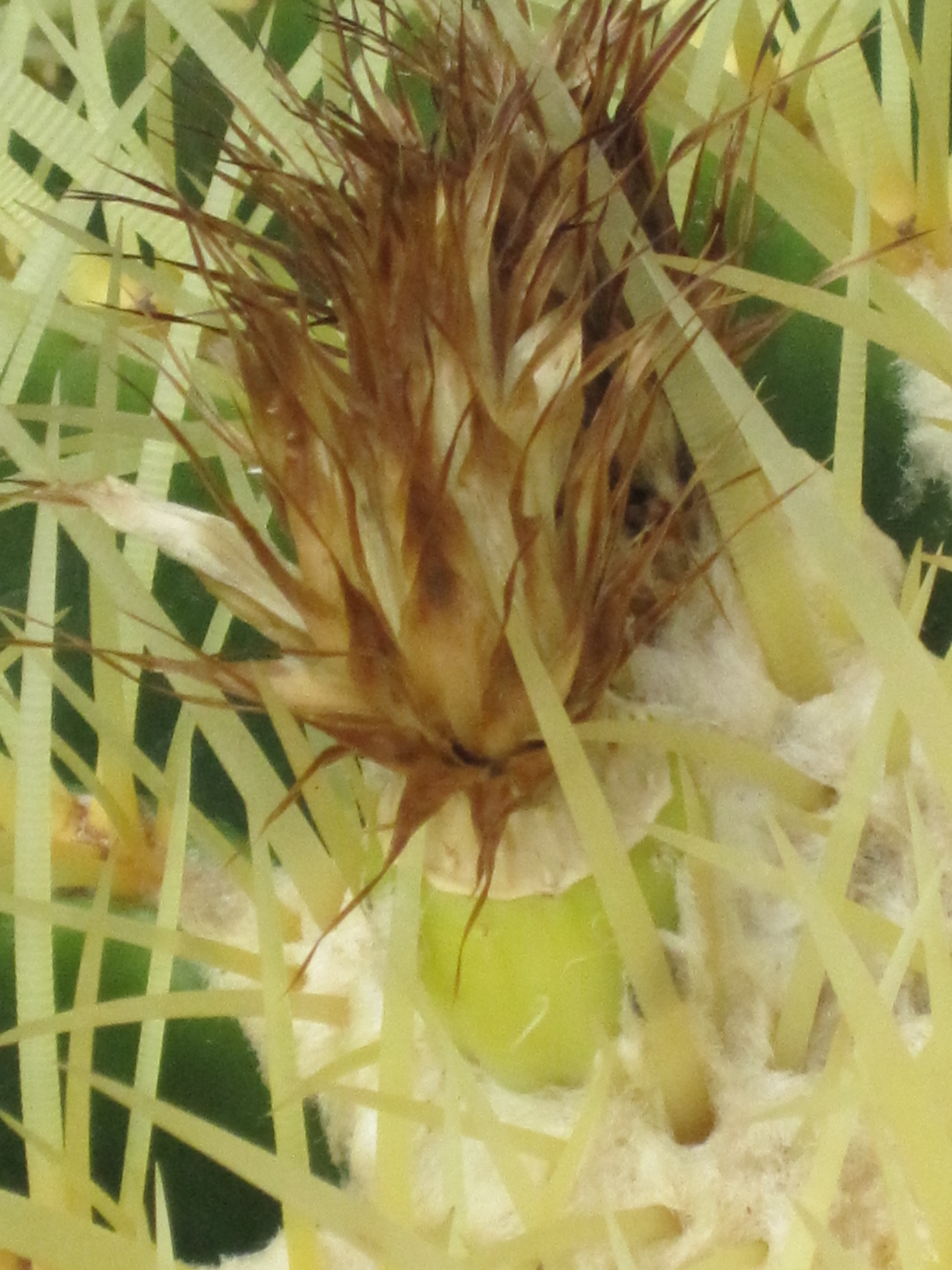
Fruit detail

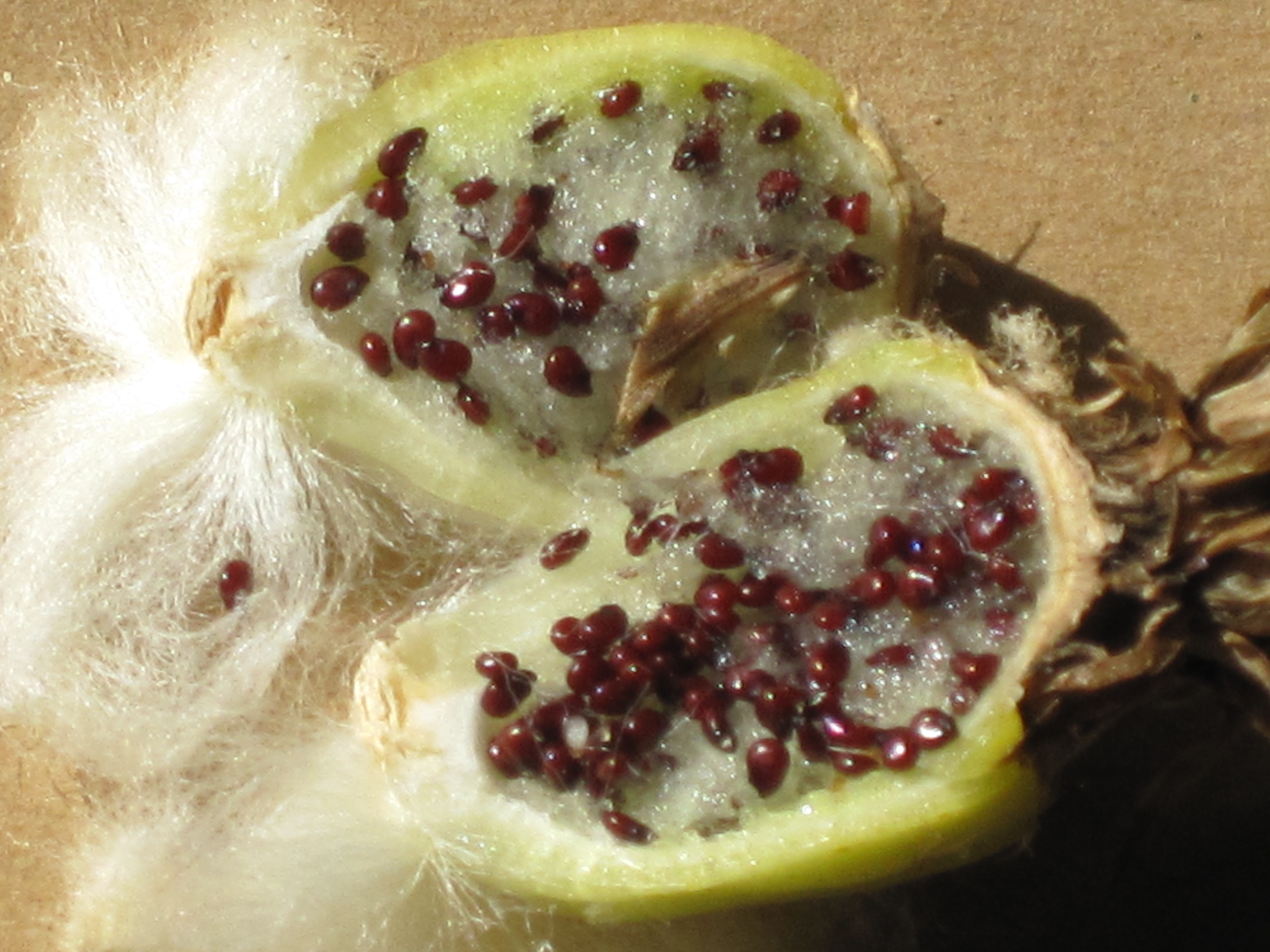
Seeds

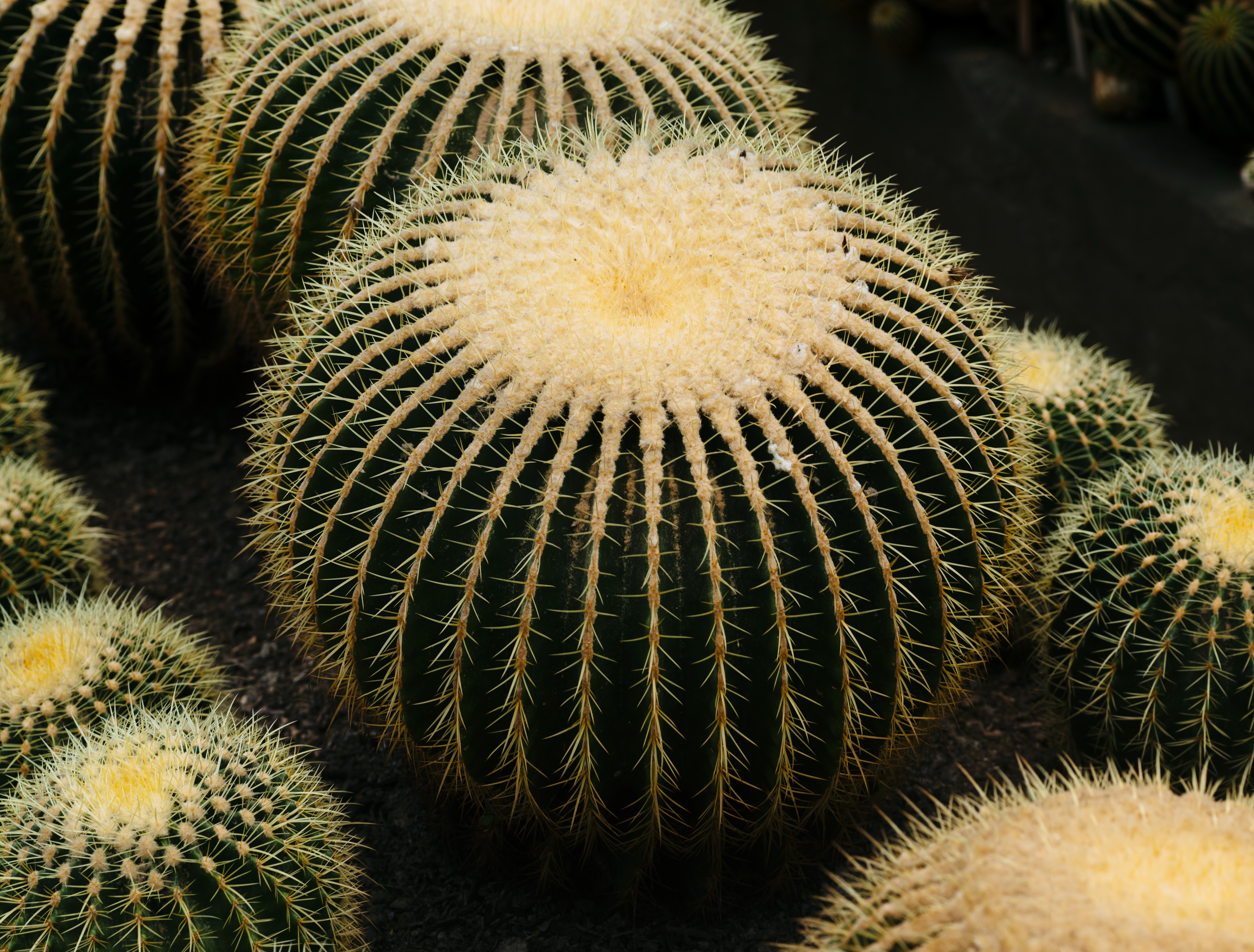
Mature golden barrel in cluster form in a greenhouse in Kalimpong

== See also ==
- Cacti of Mexico
