= La Puntilla, La Rioja =

Coordinates: 29°09′41″S 67°28′54″W

La Puntilla (La Rioja)
- Municipality and village
- Interactive map of La Puntilla (La Rioja)
- Country: Argentina
- Province: La Rioja Province
- Time zone: UTC−3 (ART)
- Climate: BWk

La Puntilla (La Rioja) is a municipality and village in La Rioja Province in northwestern Argentina.
