= Heinrich Hildmann =

Heinrich Hildmann (ca. 1845–after 1918) was a German plantsman who specialized in cactus. He trained as a gardener at the Haage and Schmidt nurseries in Erfurt. He went to Paris about 1866 to work in the cactus nursery of Charles Pfersdorff, before opening his own nursery in Lyon. Returning to Germany at the outbreak of the Franco-Prussian War he established a cactus nursery in Berlin, later locating in the nearby town of Birkenwerder. He sold the business in 1891 but continued as advisor to the new owner for several years. While 1895, the year of his last original published article on cacti is often given as the year of his death, he continued his annual membership in the Brandenburg Botanical Society (Botanisschen Vereins der Provinz Brandenburg) from 1892 until 1911, but he was then still alive.
