= William Deverell (historian) =

American historian

- Born: April 24, 1962 (age 64); California, United States
- Occupation: Historian
- Spouse: Jennifer Armstrong Watts (m. 1995)

Academic background
- Education: Princeton University

Academic work
- Discipline: American history
- Sub-discipline: 19th and 20th century American West
- Institutions: University of Southern California
- Main interests: American West post-Civil War

William Deverell (born 1962) is an historian of the American West and a professor of history at the University of Southern California, where he directs the Huntington-USC Institute on California and the West and was Chair of the Department of History at Dornsife College and Arts and Sciences from 2014 to 2016.

== Education ==
William Deverell is from Colorado. He graduated A.B. from Stanford University in June 1983. He received his M.A. and Ph.D. degrees in history from Princeton University in 1989. From 1988-1990, Deverell was a postdoctoral instructor at the Huntington Library and California Institute of Technology.

== Career ==
In 1990 he was appointed assistant professor at University of California, San Diego, and then four years later associate professor, before moving back to the California Institute of Technology. In July 2004, he became the professor of history at the University of Southern California, where he founded The Huntington-USC Institute on California and the West.

Since 2006 he has been on the nominating committee of the Western Historical Association. In 2007-2008, Deverell was a Fletcher Jones Foundation Fellow at the Huntington Library. In 2008 and 2009 he was asked by the California court to testify as an expert witness in San Jose v. Union Pacific Railroad Corporation.

From 2009-2010 he held a fellowship at Yale University as Beinecke Senior Research Fellow attached to the Howard Lamar Center for Frontiers and Borders. Upon returning to Southern California, he co-founded the Los Angeles Service Academy (LAServiceAcademy.org), a high school outreach program, in 2011.

Deverell’s research and writing generally addresses the history and culture of the 19th and 20th century American West.

== Personal life ==
In September 1995, Deverell married Jennifer Armstrong Watts, senior projects curator at The Huntington, in Summit, New Jersey. They have two children and live in Pasadena, California.

== Selected publications ==
- Deverell, William (2005). Whitewashed Adobe: The Rise of Los Angeles and the Remaking of Its Mexican Past. University of California Press. ISBN 978-0-520-24667-6.
- Deverell, William; Hise, Greg, eds. (2006). Land of Sunshine: An Environmental History of Metropolitan Los Angeles. University of Pittsburgh Press. ISBN 978-0-8229-5939-7.
- Deverell, William; Hise, Greg, eds. (2014). A Companion to Los Angeles. John Wiley & Sons. ISBN 978-1-118-79805-8.
- Deverell, William; Hise, Greg (2016). Form and Landscape: Southern California Edison and the Los Angeles Basin, 1940-1990. Huntington-USC Institute on California and the West. ISBN 978-0-692-77396-3.
