= Christina Nielsen (museum director) =

American museum director and curator

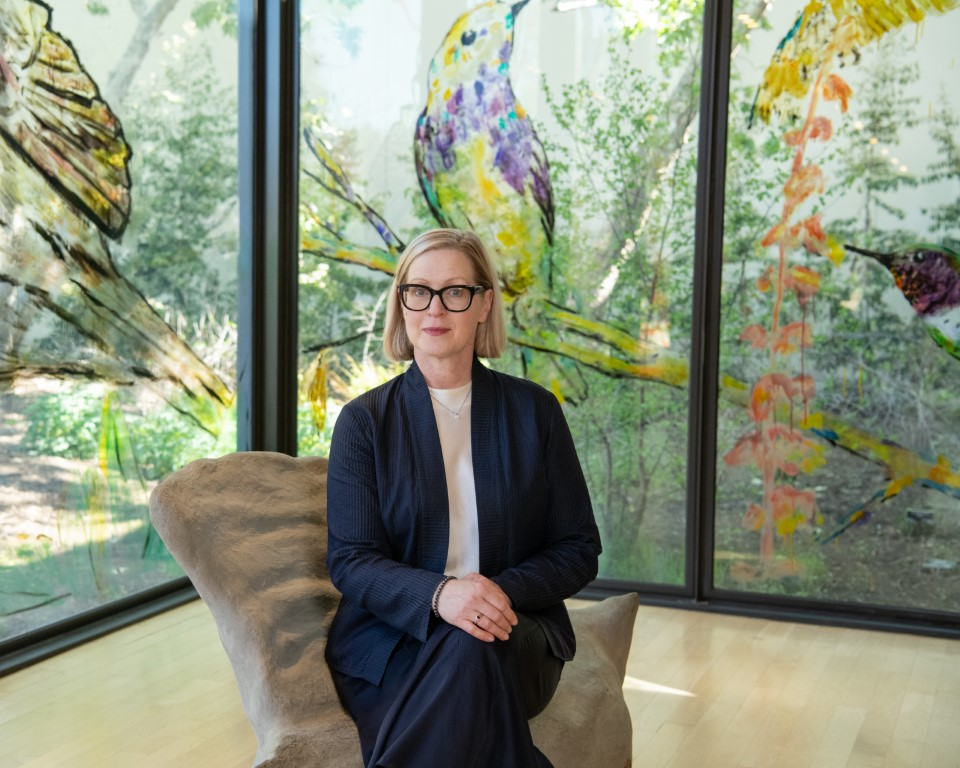
Christina Nielsen

Christina Nielsen is an American museum director, art historian and curator.

As of 2025 she is the Hannah and Russel Kully Director of the Art Museum at the Huntington Library, Art Museum, and Botanical Gardens in San Marino, California. Appointed on October 15, 2018, she leads the institution's art division, which includes European, American and Asian art collections. She previously held senior curatorial positions at the Isabella Stewart Gardner Museum in Boston and the Art Institute of Chicago. She is also a fellow of the Center for Curatorial Leadership.

== Early life and education ==
Nielsen obtained a Ph.D. in art history from the University of Chicago in 2002. She received a Fulbright Fellowship in Germany, and held research appointments at The Met in 1999 and The Getty from 2000 to 2001. She received a fellowship at the Center for Curatorial Leadership in 2017, in New York.

== Early career ==
Before joining the Isabella Stewart Gardner Museum, Nielsen was an associate curator in the department of medieval to modern European painting and sculpture at the Art Institute of Chicago. Her next role, at the Isabella Stewart Gardner Museum in Boston, was the curator of the collection and exhibition program. She amplified the possibilities in the Gardner’s new wing, making the most of additional exhibition space with a program of popular and critically acclaimed exhibitions featuring works from the collection by Titian and John Singer Sargent.

== Huntington Library ==
In August 2018, Nielsen was appointed Hannah and Russel Kully Director of the art museum at The Huntington, officially assuming the role on October 15, 2018. Upon her appointment, Nielsen emphasized the creation of a more integrated museum by fostering "programmatic cross-pollination" between The Huntington's distinct library, art, and botanical collections. In her role, she oversees the institution's collection of more than 50,000 works of European, American and Asian art and guides its staff, research, and exhibitions programs. Nielsen has stated that her focus is to create a more integrated experience for visitors, breaking down the traditional separation between the library, art, and gardens. Under her leadership, The Huntington formed a partnership with The Ahmanson Foundation that is annually enriching the permanent collection, including significant works by Thomas Cole, Elisabeth Louise Vigee LeBrun, and Francisco de Goya. She has also secured important additions to the collection, including works by Qui Ying and David Hockney.

At the Huntington, Nielsen has also overseen a strategic plan to re-contextualize historical art by acquiring and commissioning works from contemporary artists, and creating dialogues between the different collections to tell more comprehensive stories. A key example was the 2021 acquisition of Kehinde Wiley's A Portrait of a Young Gentleman. The work was created to be placed in direct dialogue with The Blue Boy by Thomas Gainsborough as part of a broader effort to have the permanent collection reflect a more diverse range of stories and perspectives. Nielsen called the acquisition a "once-in-a-generation opportunity" for the institution.

Reflecting her focus on connecting historical art with contemporary experience and collaboration, Nielsen's tenure has also included a major partnership with the Hammer Museum for its 2020 biennial, "Made in L.A. 2020: a version". For the first time, the exhibition was presented at both institutions, bridging the city's west and east sides and placing new works from Los Angeles artists in conversation with The Huntington's historical collections. Nielsen has also overseen initiatives like "Living Artists at The Huntington", which aims to bring contemporary artists' voices into the museum's historical collections and spaces. She has been a public voice for the museum's collection, discussing the enduring power of works like Joseph Wright of Derby’s An Experiment on a Bird in the Air Pump and its relevance to contemporary audiences.

=== Professional affiliations ===
Nielsen is a 2017 fellow of the Center for Curatorial Leadership (CCL).

== See also ==
- Edmund de Waal
- Art Institute of Chicago
