= Huntington-USC Institute on California and the West =

US educational institute

The Huntington-USC Institute on California and the West is an educational institute created in 2004 by a partnership between the Huntington Library and the University of Southern California. Its goal is to bring together writers, students, scholars, policy-makers, and historians to study the history of the American West and California, and to promote more extensive use of the Huntington Library's extensive materials on the subject. The institute has sponsored conferences and research on subjects such as the impact of the Hollywood film industry and the "subterranean West".
