= Huntington Library =

Library, art museum, and garden in San Marino, California, US

The Huntington Library, Art Museum, and Botanical Gardens
- Founded: 1919
- Founders: Henry E. Huntington, Arabella Huntington
- Type: Collections-based research and educational institution
- Purpose: Research, education
- Location: San Marino, California, U.S.
- Coordinates: 34°07′38″N 118°06′36″W
- Region served: Southern California
- President: Karen R. Lawrence
- Endowment: $728 million (as of June 30, 2023)
- Employees: 478
- Volunteers: 1,200
- Website: huntington.org

The Huntington Library, Art Museum and Botanical Gardens, known as The Huntington, is a collections-based educational and research institution established by Henry E. Huntington and Arabella Huntington in San Marino, California, United States. In addition to the library, the institution houses an extensive art collection with a focus on 18th and 19th century European art and 17th to mid-20th century American art. The property also has approximately 120 acres (49 ha) of specialized botanical landscaped gardens, including the "Japanese Garden", the "Desert Garden", and the "Chinese Garden".

== History ==
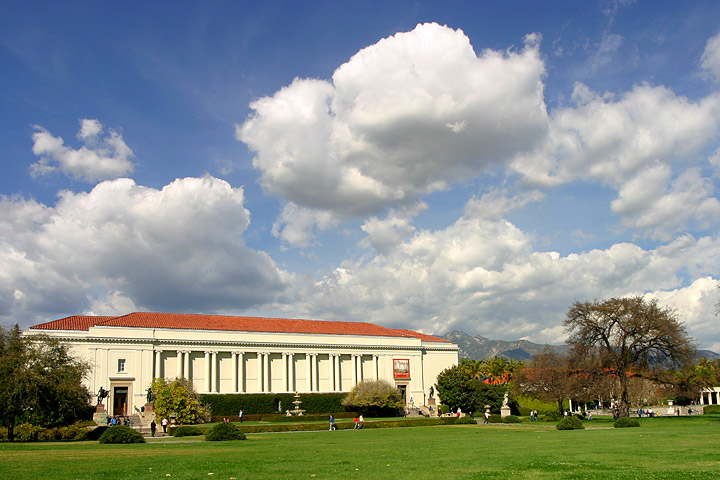
Huntington Library, built in 1920; its main reading room now is an exhibition hall.

As a landowner, Henry Edwards Huntington (1850–1927) played a major role in the growth of Southern California. Huntington was born in 1850, in Oneonta, New York, and was the nephew and heir of Collis P. Huntington (1821–1900), one of the famous "Big Four" railroad tycoons of nineteenth century California history. In 1892, Huntington relocated to San Francisco with his first wife, Mary Alice Prentice, and their four children. In 1902, he relocated from the financial and political center of Northern California, San Francisco, to the state's newer southern major metropolis, Los Angeles. In 1903, he purchased the 600 acres (240 ha) "San Marino Ranch" from James DeBarth Shorb Jr (1870–1907) for $240,000. He later purchased other large tracts of land in the Pasadena and Los Angeles areas of Los Angeles County for urban and suburban development. He divorced Mary Alice Prentice in 1906. He was one of the founders of the City of San Marino which was incorporated on April 25, 1913. On July 16, 1913, he married his uncle's widow, Arabella Huntington (1851–1924). As president of the Pacific Electric Railway Company, the regional streetcar and public transit system for the Los Angeles metropolitan area and southern California and also of the Los Angeles Railway Company (later the Southern California Railway), he spearheaded urban and regional transportation efforts to link together far-flung communities, supporting growth of those communities as well as promoting commerce, recreation and tourism.

Huntington's interest in art was influenced in large part by Arabella, and with art experts to guide him, he benefited from a post-World War I European market that was "ready to sell almost anything". Before his death in 1927, Huntington amassed "far and away the greatest group of eighteenth-century British portraits ever assembled by any one man". In accordance with Huntington's will, the collection, then worth $50 million, was opened to the public in 1928.

On October 17, 1985, a fire erupted in an elevator shaft of the Huntington Art Gallery and destroyed Sir Joshua Reynolds's 1777 portrait of Mrs. Edwin Lascelles. After a year-long, $1 million refurbishing project, the Huntington Gallery reopened in 1986, with its artworks cleaned of soot and stains. Most of the funds for the cleanup and refurbishing of the Georgian mansion and its artworks came from donations from the Michael J. Connell Foundation, corporations and individuals. Both the Federal art-supporting establishment of the National Endowment for the Arts and the National Endowment for the Humanities gave emergency grants, the former of $17,500 to "support conservation and other related costs resulting from a serious fire at the Gallery of Art", and the latter of $30,000 to "support the restoration of several fire-damaged works of art that depict the story of Western culture."

On September 5, 2019, The Huntington kicked off a year-long celebration of its centennial year with exhibitions, special programs, initiatives, a special Huntington 100th rose, and a float in the 2020 Rose Parade in nearby Pasadena, California.

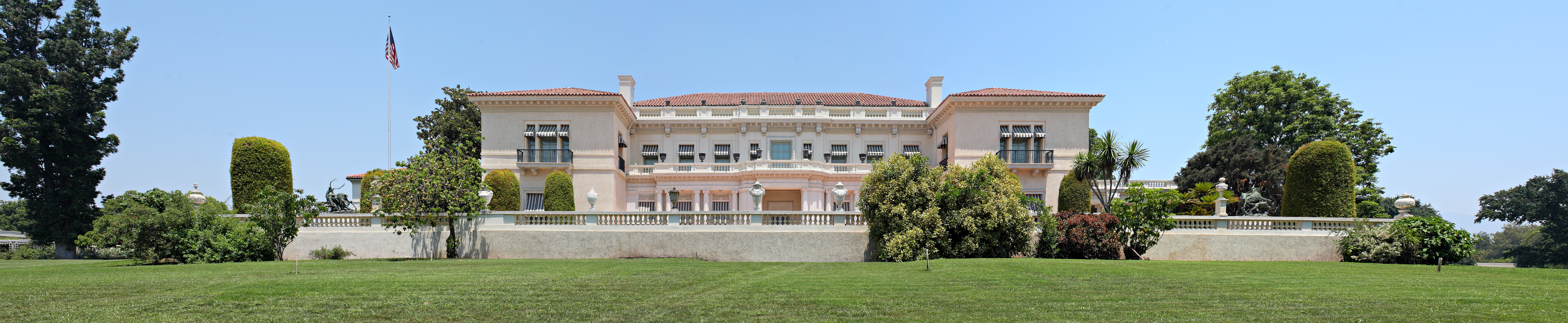
Formerly the residence of Henry E. Huntington (1850–1927) and his wife, Arabella Huntington (1850–1924), the Huntington Art Gallery opened in 1928.

== Management ==
The executive leaders of The Huntington Library, Art Museum, and Botanical Gardens are:

- President: Karen R. Lawrence
- Chief Financial Officer: Janet Alberti
- Chief Human Resources Officer: Misty Bennett
- Director of the Library: Sandra Brooke Gordon
- Director of the Botanical Gardens: Nicole Cavender
- Director of the Art Museum: Christina Nielsen
- Vice Presidents and other executive leaders: Heather Hart, Susan Juster, Thomas Polansky, Randy Shulman

With an endowment of more than $700 million (and half a billion dollars raised between 2001 and 2013), the Huntington is among the wealthiest cultural institutions in the United States. It has undertaken major restorations and construction including a $60 million education and visitors center opened in 2015. In 2022 The Huntington received 1,014,000 visitors and had 54,000 member households. It hosted 1,360 readers and 131 scholars to conduct research within the collections and served 15,994 students through programs, classes, and site visits.

== Library ==
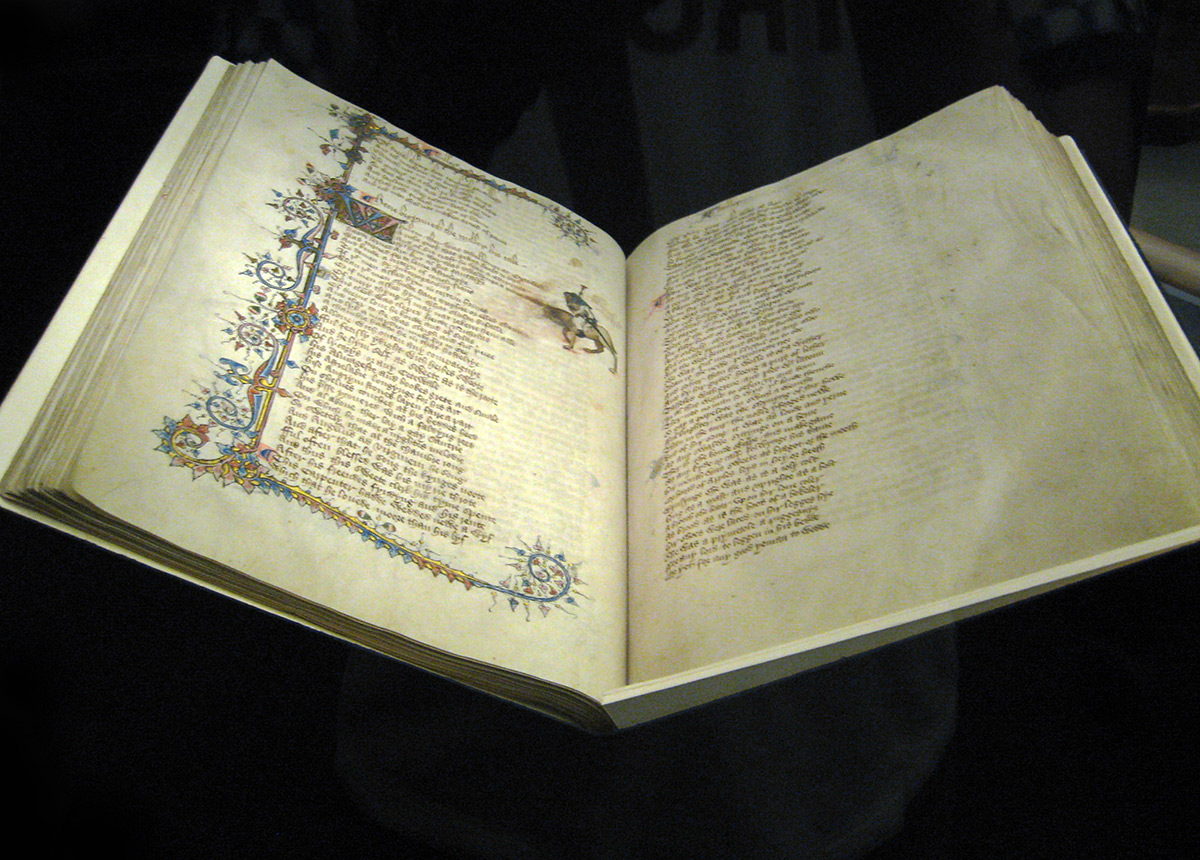
Ellesmere Manuscript, an early 15th-century manuscript of Geoffrey Chaucer's The Canterbury Tales, housed in the library

The library building was designed in 1920 by the southern California architect Myron Hunt in the Mediterranean Revival style. Hunt's previous commissions for Mr. and Mrs. Huntington included the Huntington's residence in San Marino in 1909, and the Huntington Hotel in 1914. The library contains a substantial collection of rare books and manuscripts, concentrated in the fields of British and American history, literature, art, and the history of science. Spanning from the 11th century to the present, the library's holdings contain 7 million manuscript items, over 400,000 rare books, and over a million photographs, prints, and other ephemera. With the 2006 acquisition of the Burndy Library, a collection of nearly 60,000 items, the Huntington became one of the top institutions in the world for the study of the history of science and technology.

Highlights include one of eleven vellum copies of the Gutenberg Bible known to exist, the Ellesmere manuscript of Chaucer (ca. 1410), and letters and manuscripts by George Washington, Thomas Jefferson, Benjamin Franklin, and Abraham Lincoln. It is the only library in the world with the first two quartos of Hamlet; it holds the manuscript of Benjamin Franklin's autobiography, Isaac Newton's personal copy of his Philosophiae Naturalis Principia Mathematica with annotations in Newton's own hand, the first seven drafts of Henry David Thoreau's Walden, John James Audubon's Birds of America, and first editions and manuscripts from authors such as Charles Bukowski, Jack London, Alexander Pope, William Blake, Mark Twain, and William Wordsworth. The library also holds the papers and drafts of Kent Haruf, an American novelist from Colorado. On December 14, 2022, the library announced they had acquired the archive of American author Thomas Pynchon.

=== Research ===
Researchers over age 18 may use the Library's reading rooms to consult the collection upon establishing a research need that requires the use of The Huntington's collections, identifying specific materials, and presenting the required form(s) of identification at orientation. Through a rigorous peer-review program, the institution awards approximately 150 grants to scholars in the fields of history, literature, art, and the history of science, medicine, and technology. The Huntington also hosts numerous scholarly events, lectures, conferences, and workshops.

In September 1991, then-director William A. Moffett announced that the library's photographic archive of the Dead Sea Scrolls would be available to all qualified scholars, not just those approved by the international team of editors that had so long limited access to a chosen few. The collection consists of 3,000 photographs of all the original scrolls.

Through a partnership with the University of Southern California, the library has established two research centers: the USC-Huntington Early Modern Studies Institute and the Huntington-USC Institute on California and the West.

From 2005 to 2017, American theatre director Louis Fantasia served as director of Shakespeare at the Huntington, conducting workshops on classical performance studies.

== Art collections ==
The Huntington's collections are displayed in permanent installations housed in the Huntington Art Gallery and Virginia Steele Scott Gallery of American Art. Special temporary exhibitions are mounted in the MaryLou and George Boone Gallery, with smaller, focused exhibitions displayed in the Works on Paper Room in the Huntington Art Gallery and the Susan and Stephen Chandler Wing of the Scott Galleries. In addition the gallery also hosts different exhibitions of photography throughout the year including those about different social and political subjects.

=== European art ===
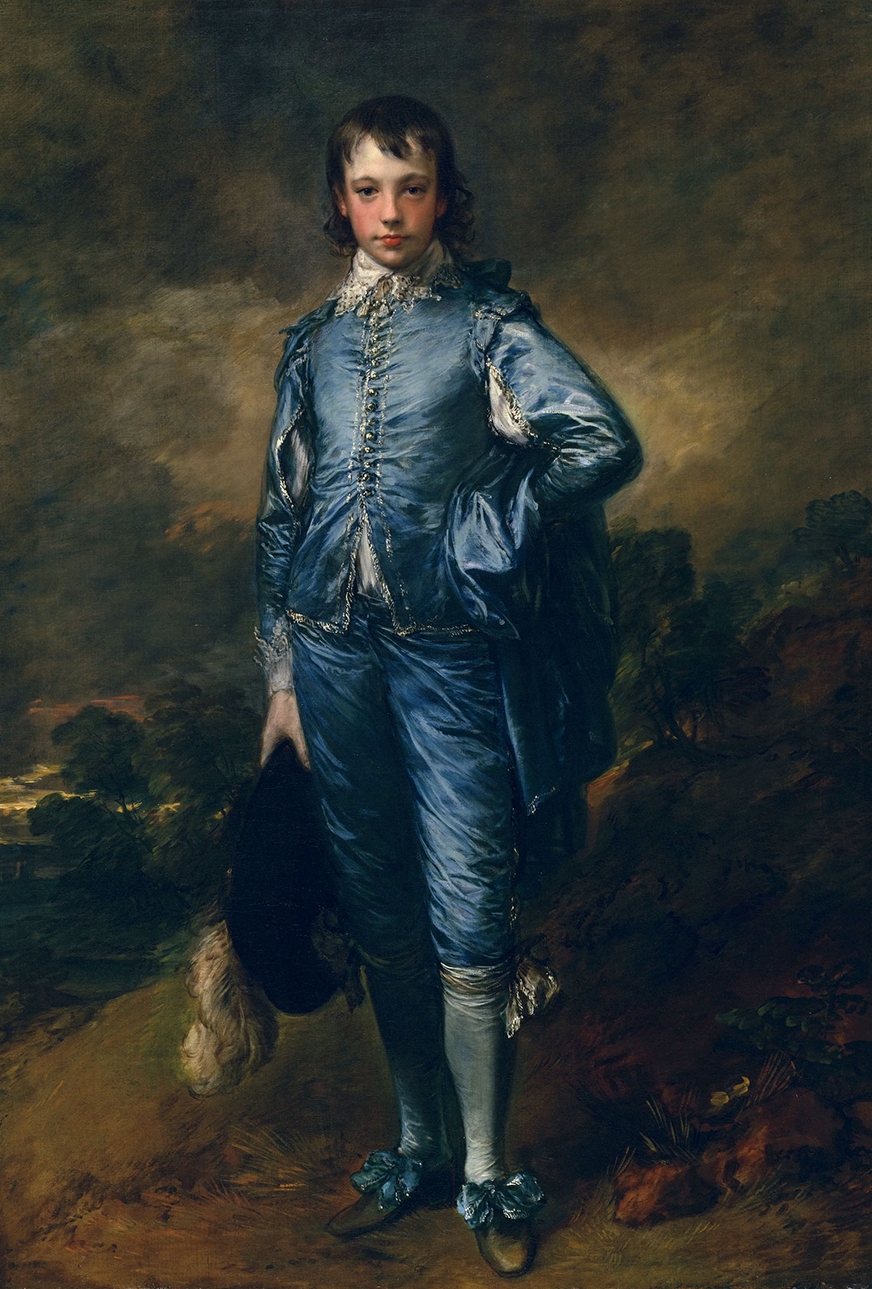
The Blue Boy by Thomas Gainsborough, c. 1770

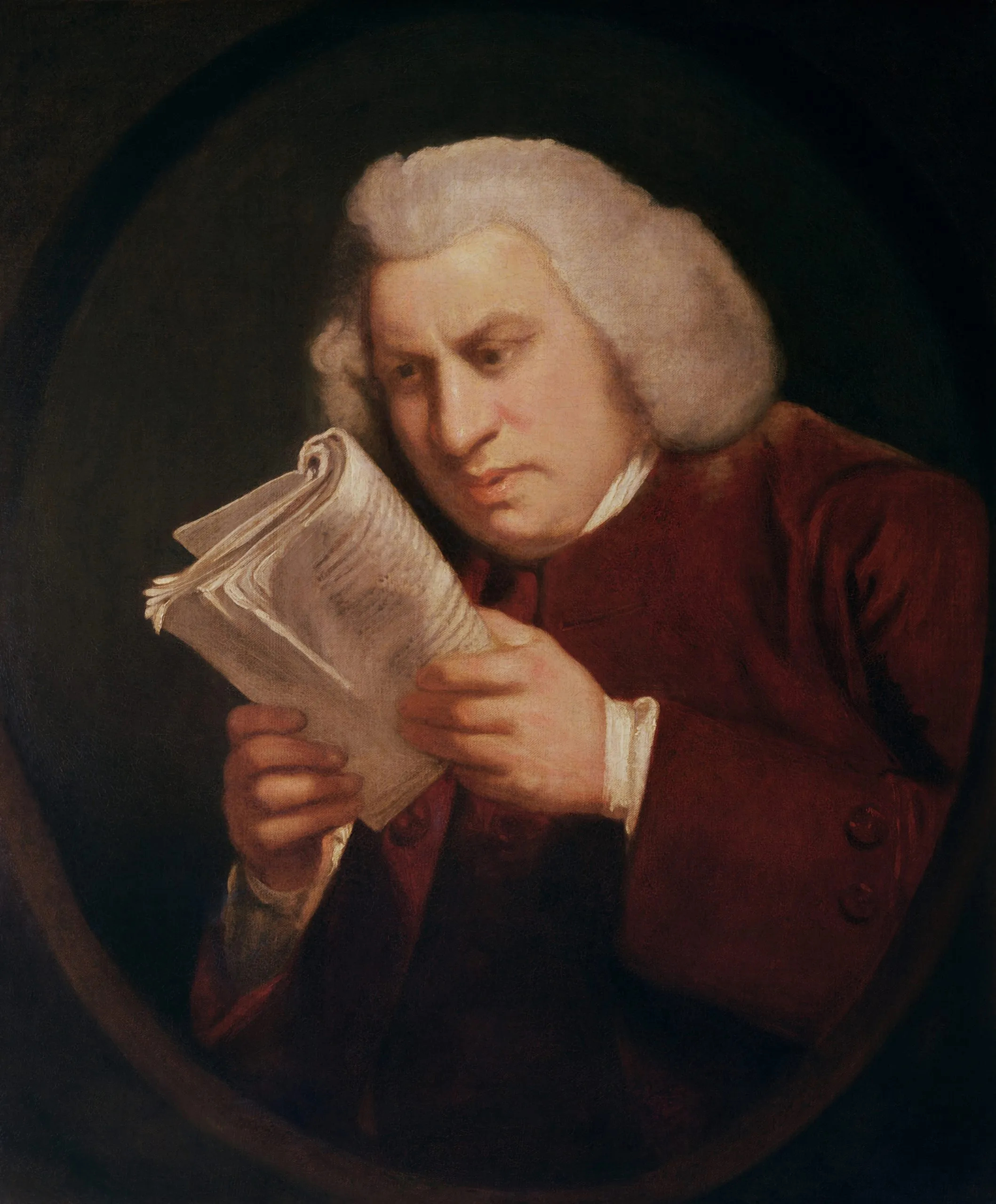
Blinking Sam by Joshua Reynolds, c. 1775

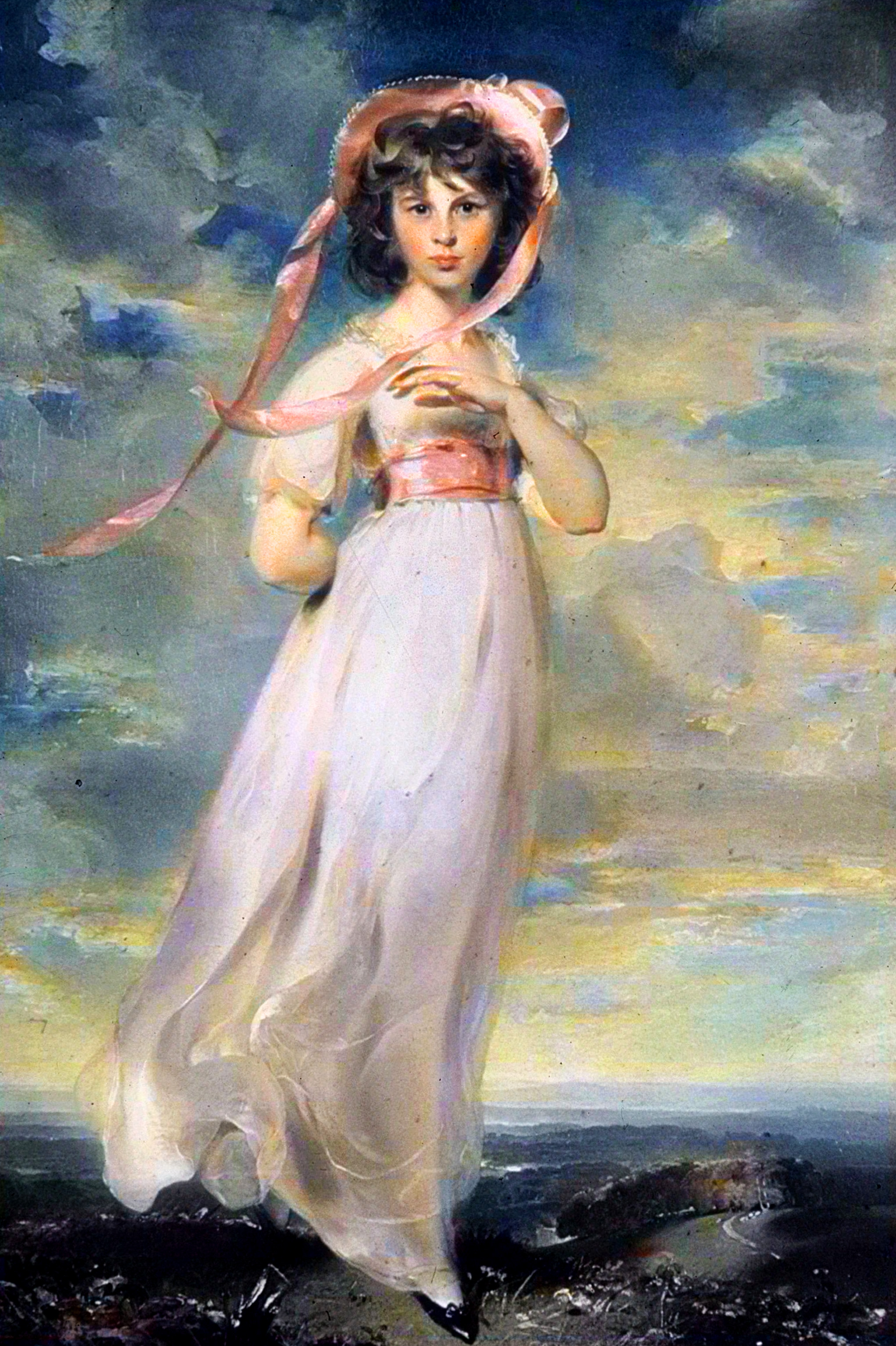
Pinkie by Thomas Lawrence, c. 1794

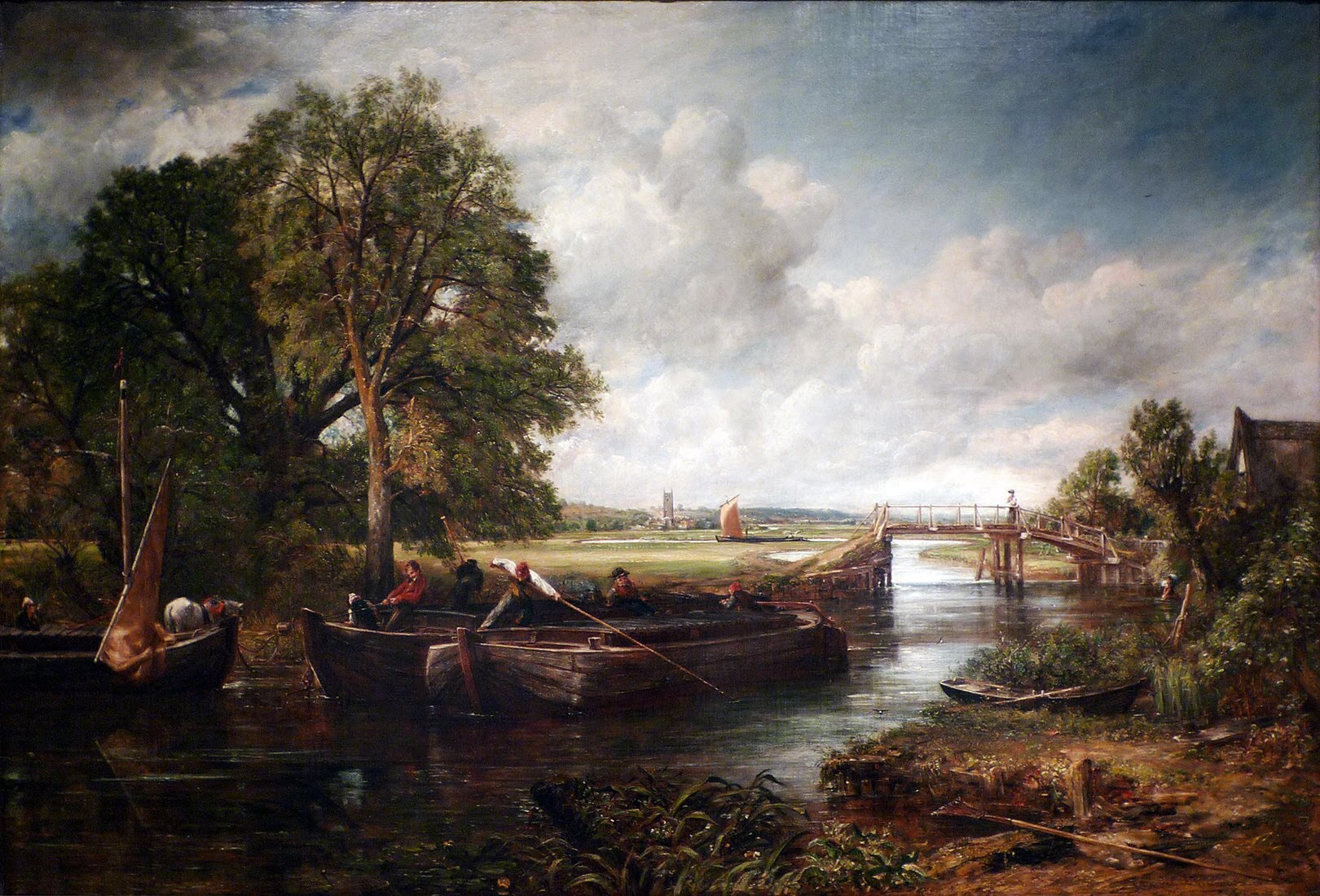
View on the Stour near Dedham by John Constable, 1822

The European collection, consisting largely of 18th- and 19th-century British & French paintings, sculptures and decorative arts, is housed in The Huntington Art Gallery, the original Huntington residence. The permanent installation also includes selections from the Arabella D. Huntington Memorial Art Collection, which contains Italian and Northern Renaissance paintings and a spectacular collection of 18th-century French tapestries, porcelain, and furniture. Some of the best known works in the European collection include The Blue Boy by Thomas Gainsborough, Pinkie by Thomas Lawrence, and Madonna and Child by Rogier van der Weyden.

=== American art ===
Complementing the European collections is the Huntington's American art holdings, a collection of paintings, prints, drawings, sculptures, and photographs dating from the 17th to the mid-20th century. The institution did not begin collecting American art until 1979, when it received a gift of 50 paintings from the Virginia Steele Scott Foundation. Consequently, The Virginia Steele Scott Gallery of American Art was established in 1984. In 2009, the Virginia Steele Scott Galleries were expanded, refurbished, and reinstalled. The new showcase, a $1.6 million project designed to give the Huntington's growing American art collection more space and visibility, combines the original, 1984 American gallery with the Lois and Robert F. Erburu Gallery, a modern classical addition designed by Los Angeles architect Frederick Fisher. Highlights among the American art collections include Breakfast in Bed by Mary Cassatt, The Long Leg by Edward Hopper, Small Crushed Campbell's Soup Can (Beef Noodle) by Andy Warhol, and Global Loft (Spread) by Robert Rauschenberg. As of 2014, the collection numbers some 12,000 works, ninety percent of them drawings, photographs and prints.

In 2014, the library acquired the Millard Sheets mural Southern California landscape (1934), the dining room wall painting originally painted for homeowners Fred H. and Bessie Ranke in the Hollywood Hills of Los Angeles.

=== Acquisitions ===
In 1999, the Huntington acquired the collection of materials relating to Arts and Crafts artist and designer William Morris amassed by Sanford and Helen Berger, comprising stained glass, wallpaper, textiles, embroidery, drawings, ceramics, more than 2,000 books, original woodblock prints, and the complete archives of Morris's decorative arts firm Morris & Co. and its predecessor Morris, Marshall, Faulkner & Co. These materials formed the foundation for the 2002 exhibit "William Morris: Creating the Useful and the Beautiful".

In 2005, actor Steve Martin gave $1 million to the Huntington to support exhibitions and acquisitions of American art, with three-quarters of the money to be spent on exhibitions and the rest on purchases of artworks. In 2009, Andy Warhol's painting Small Crushed Campbell's Soup Can (Beef Noodle) (1962) as well as group of the artist's Brillo Boxes were donated by the estate of Robert Shapazian, the founding director of Gagosian Gallery in Beverly Hills. In 2011, a $1.75 million acquisition fund for post-1945 American art was established by unidentified patrons in honor of the late Shapazian. The first purchase from the fund was the painting Global Loft (Spread) (1979) by Robert Rauschenberg.

In 2012, the museum acquired its first major work by an African-American artist when it purchased a 22-foot-long carved redwood panel from 1937 by sculptor Sargent Claude Johnson.

In October 2023, the museum unveiled a 320-year-old, 3,000 square feet (280 m^{2}) Japanese home once owned by a shōya (village head). From 2018 to 2023, craftspeople carefully disassembled the house, labeled, cleaned, and repaired each part, reassembled the house in a Japanese warehouse, refitted the house to US building codes, disassembled it again, and reassembled it in California. Curator Robert Hori likened the whole process to building a "giant model airplane."

== Botanical gardens ==
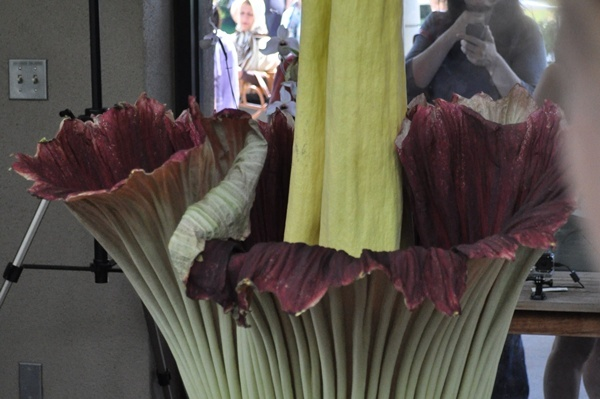
Amorphophallus titanum at Huntington Library in August 2014

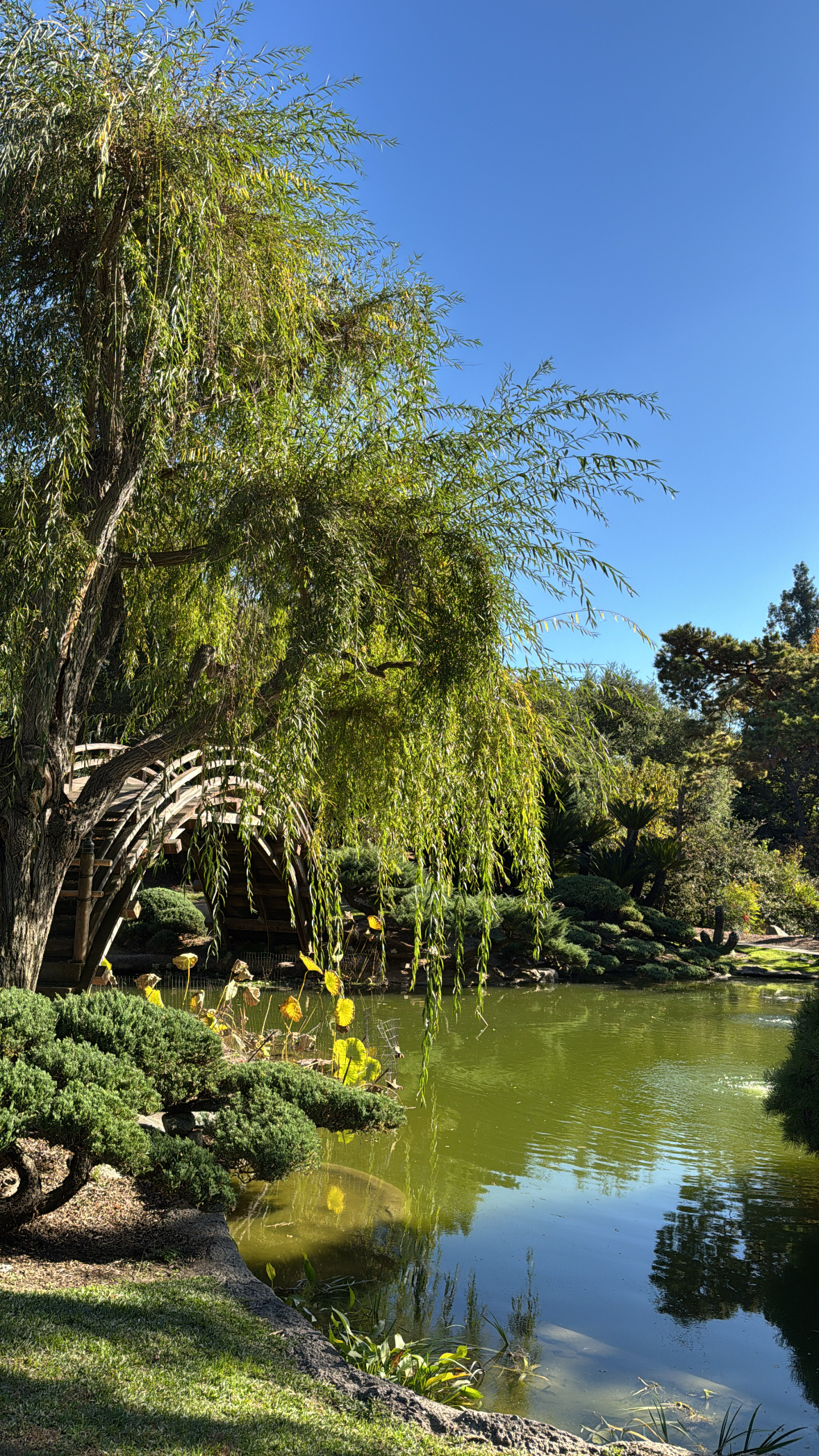
Moon Bridge

The Huntington's botanical gardens cover 120 acres (49 ha) and showcase plants from around the world. Today, his many projects of horticulture continue to provide opportunities for botanical research. The gardens are divided into more than a dozen themes, including the Australian Garden, Camellia Collection, Children's Garden, Desert Garden, Herb Garden, Japanese Garden, Lily Ponds, North Vista, Palm Garden, Rose Garden, the Shakespeare Garden, Subtropical and Jungle Garden, and the Chinese Garden (Liu Fang Yuan 流芳園 or the Garden of Flowing Fragrance).

The Rose Hills Foundation Conservatory for Botanical Science has a large tropical plant collection, as well as a carnivorous plants wing. The Huntington has a program to protect and propagate endangered plant species. In 1999, 2002, 2009, 2010, 2014, 2018 (4), 2019, 2020, 2021 (3), 2022, 2023 (3), 2024, 2025 and 2026 (2) specimens of Amorphophallus titanum, or the odiferous "corpse flower", bloomed at the facility. Twenty-one corpse flowers have bloomed at Huntington since 1999.

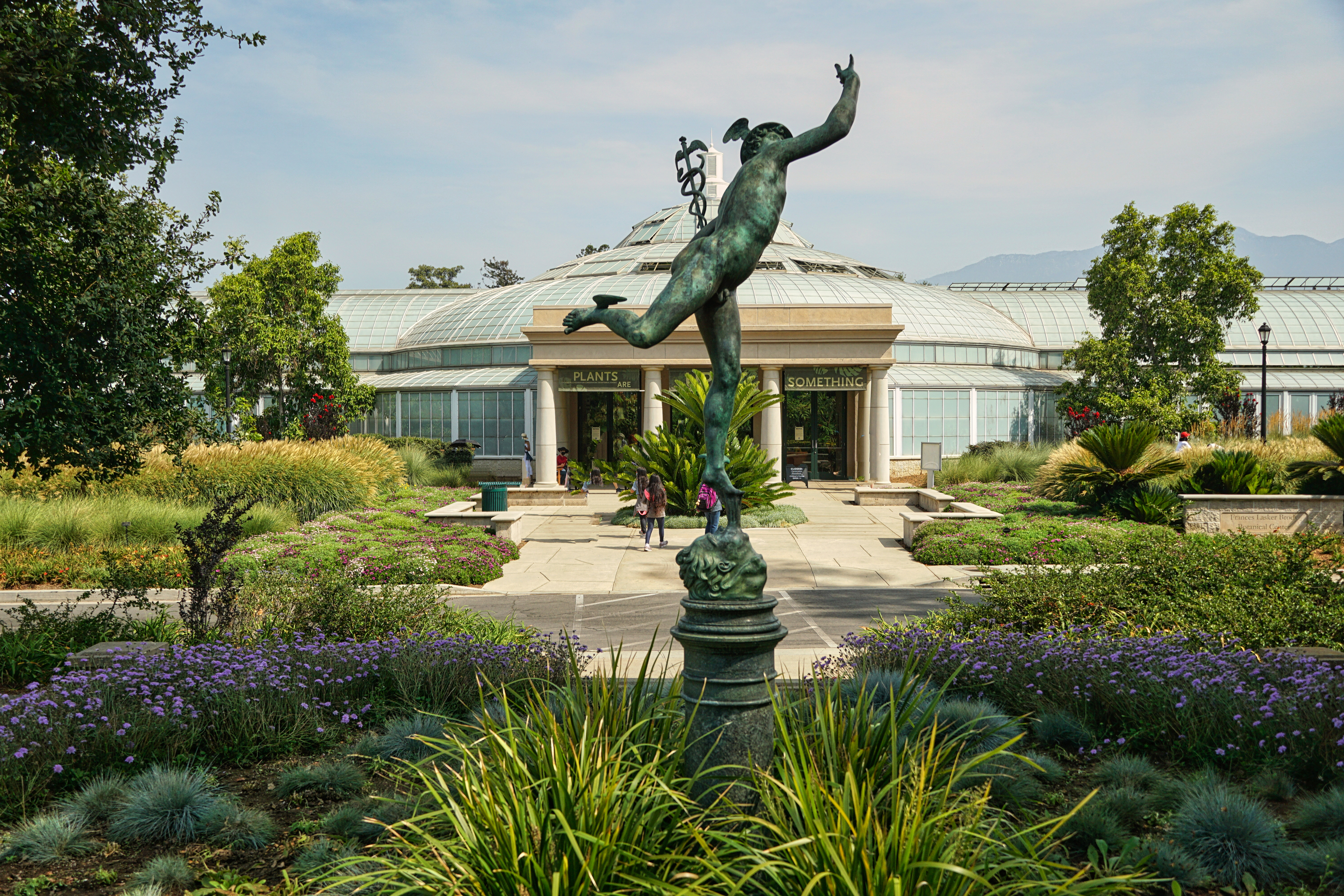
Conservatory

The Camellia Collection, recognized as an International Camellia Garden of Excellence, includes nearly eighty different camellia species and some 1,200 cultivated varieties, many of them rare and historic. The Rose Garden contains approximately 1,200 cultivars (4,000 individual plants) arranged historically to trace the development of roses from ancient to modern times.

=== Chinese Garden ===
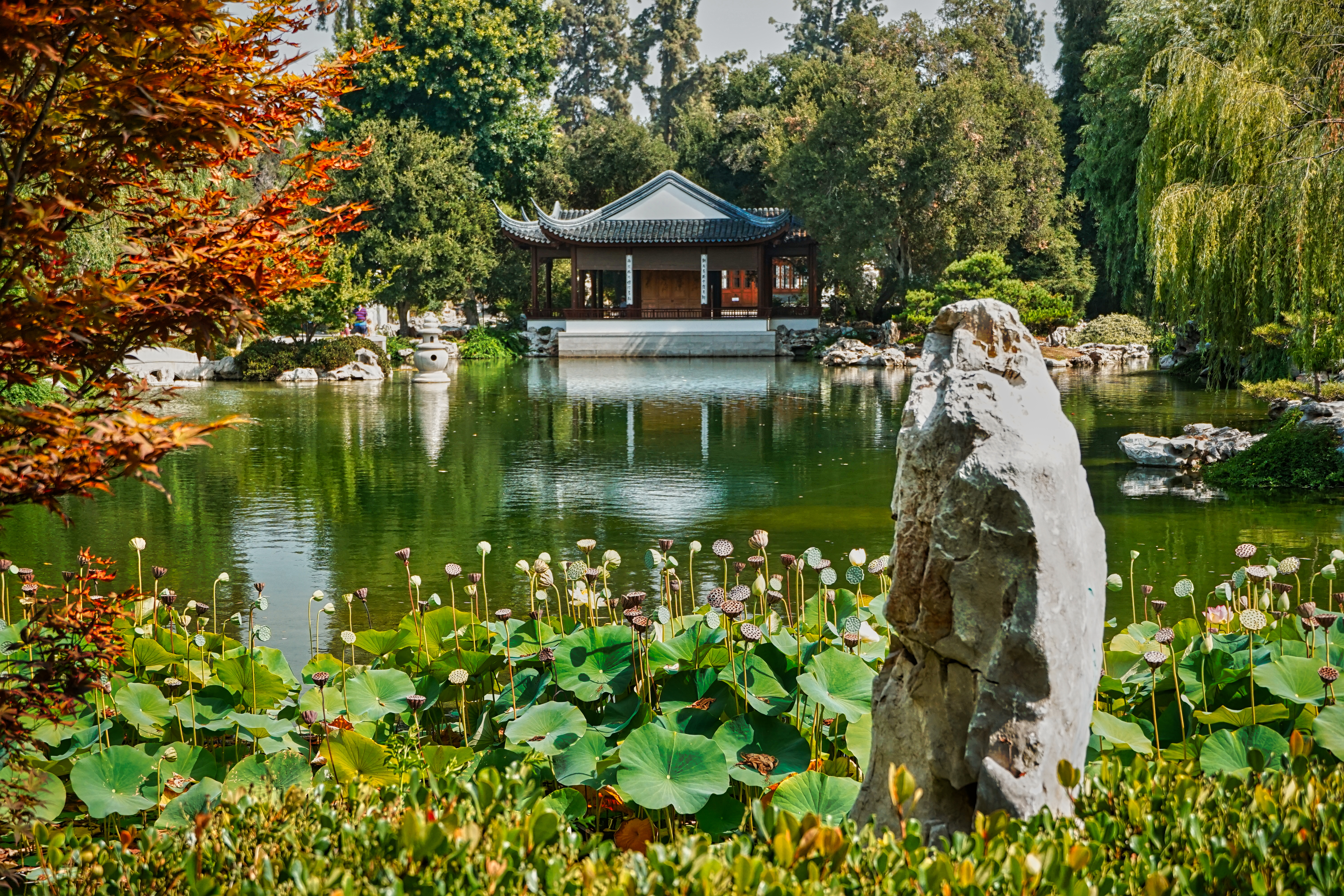
Chinese Garden Liu Fang Yuan

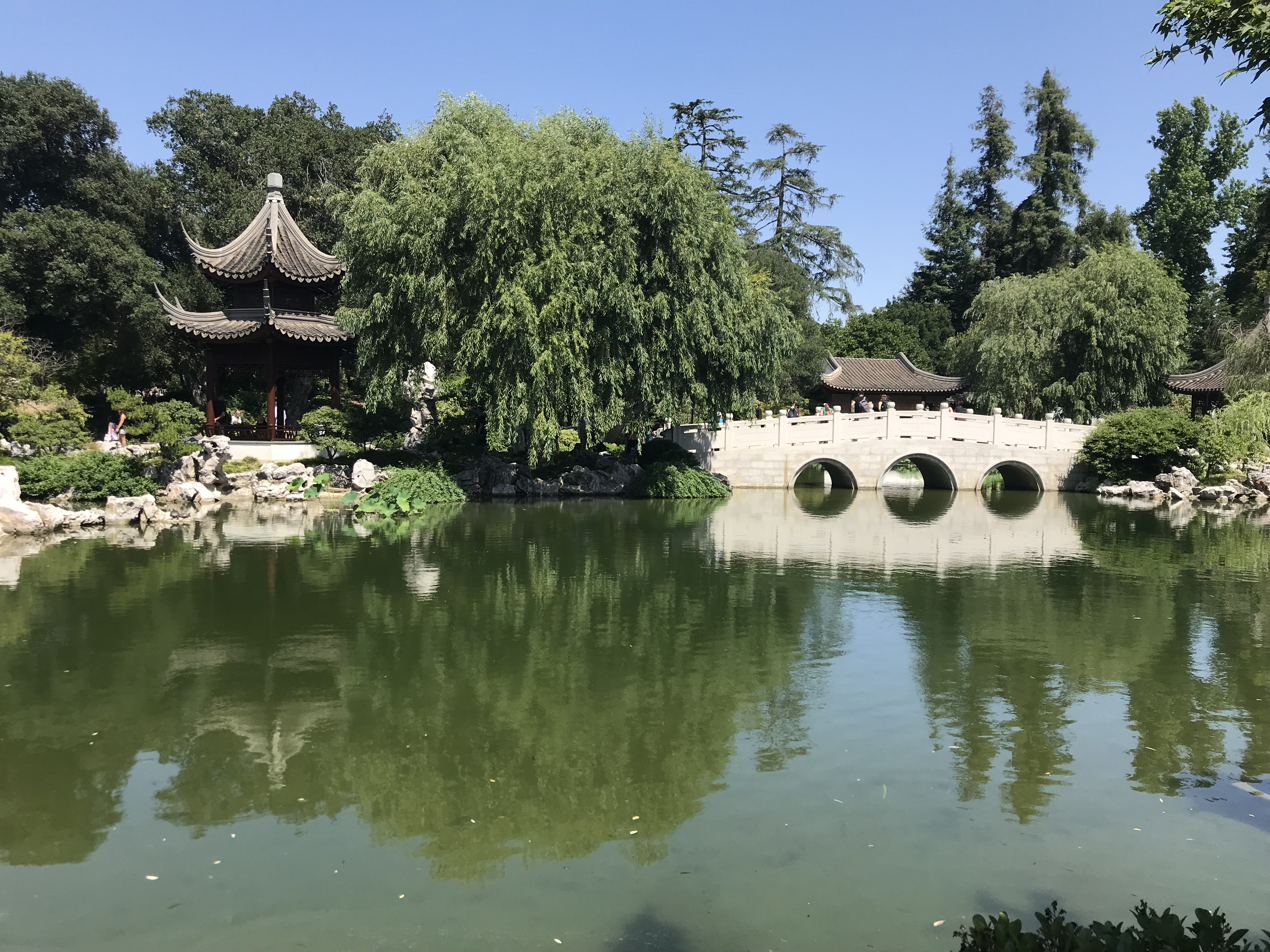
Bridge in the Chinese Garden

A Chinese garden, the largest outside of China, was dedicated on February 26, 2008, after artisans from Suzhou, China spent some six months at Huntington to construct the first phase of the newest facility. On 12 acres (4.9 ha) at the northwest corner of the Huntington, the garden features man-made lakes ("Pond of Reflected Greenery" and "Lake of Reflected Fragrance") with pavilions connected by bridges. Unique Chinese names are assigned to many of the facilities in the garden, such as the tea house, known as the "Hall of the Jade Camellia". Other pavilions are the "Love for the Lotus Pavilion", "Terrace of the Jade Mirror", and "Pavilion of the Three Friends". The initial phase cost $18.3 million to build.

The second phase, which includes the "Clear and Transcendent Pavilion", "Lingering Clouds Peak" with a waterfall, Waveless Boat, "Crossing through Fragrance" bridge and the "Cloud Steps" bridge, opened on March 8, 2014. There were other pavilions, including the "Flowery Brush Studio", and structures completed under phase two. A place to display its large collections of penjing and bonsai has completed.

=== Desert Garden ===
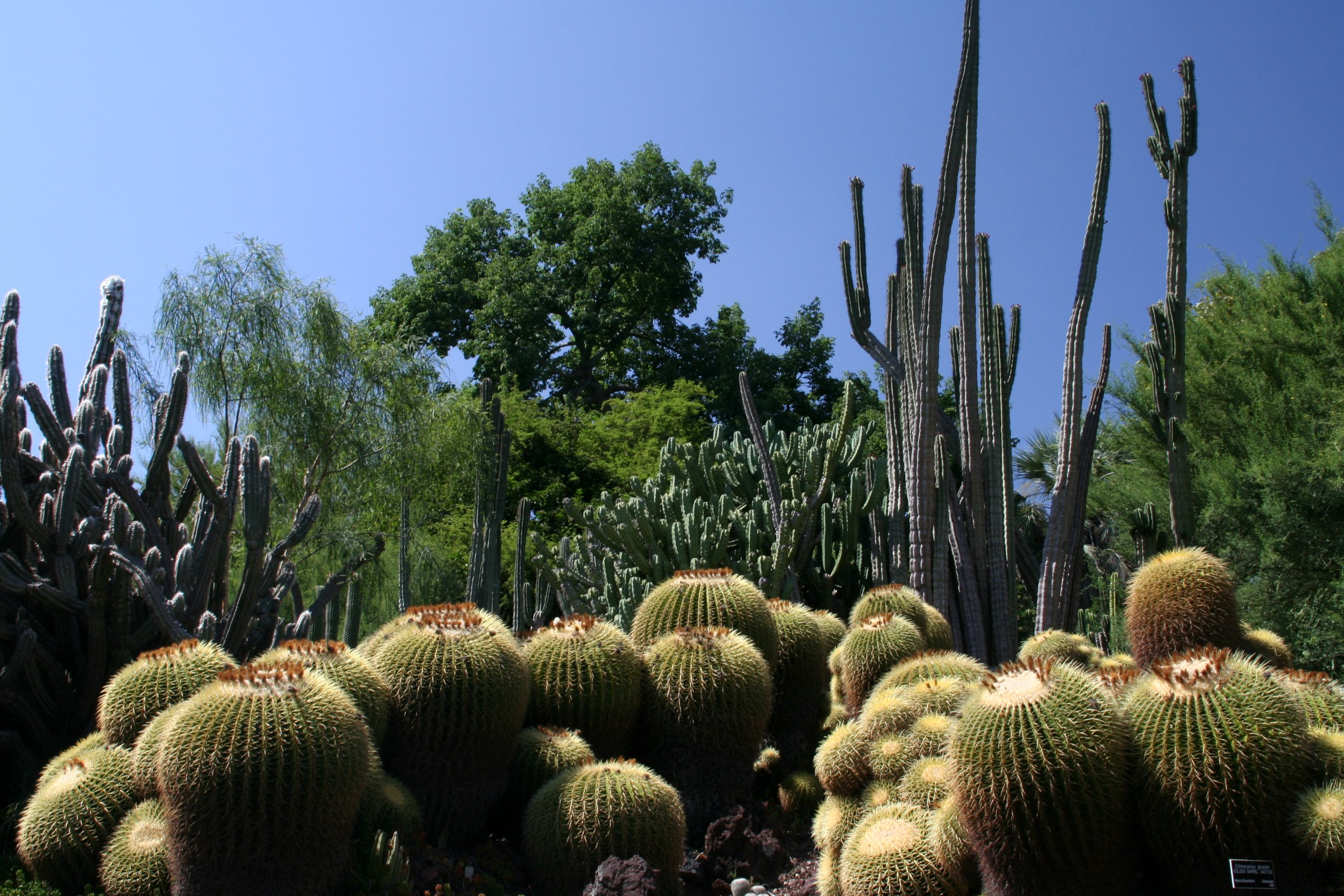
Desert Garden

The Desert Garden, one of the world's largest and oldest outdoor collections of cacti and other succulents, contains plants from extreme environments, many of which were acquired by Henry E. Huntington and William Hertrich (the garden curator). One of the Huntington's most botanically important gardens, the Desert Garden brings together a plant group largely unknown and unappreciated in the beginning of the 1900s. Containing a broad category of xerophytes (aridity-adapted plants), the Desert Garden grew to preeminence and remains today among the world's finest, with more than 5,000 species.

=== Japanese Garden ===
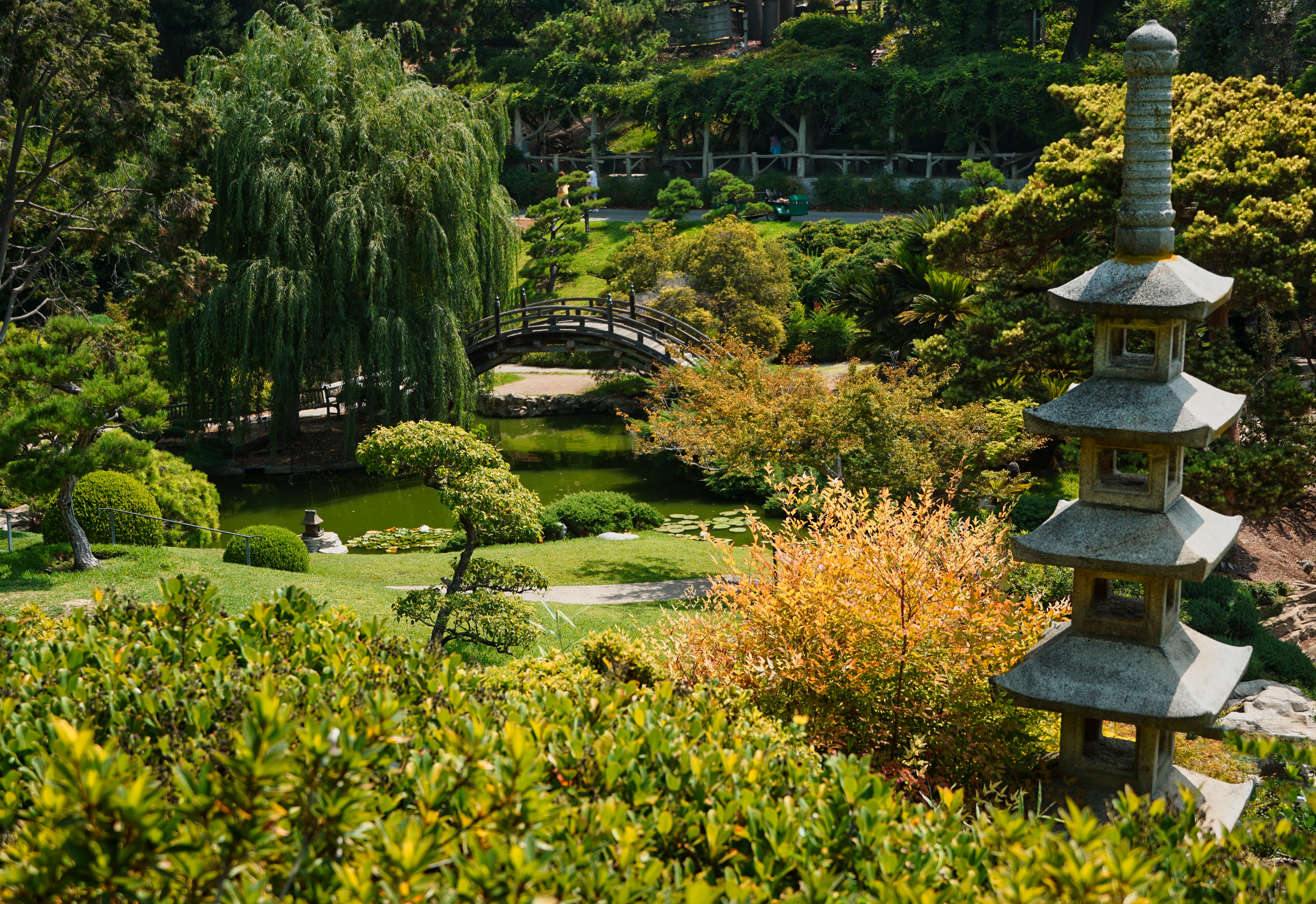
Japanese Garden

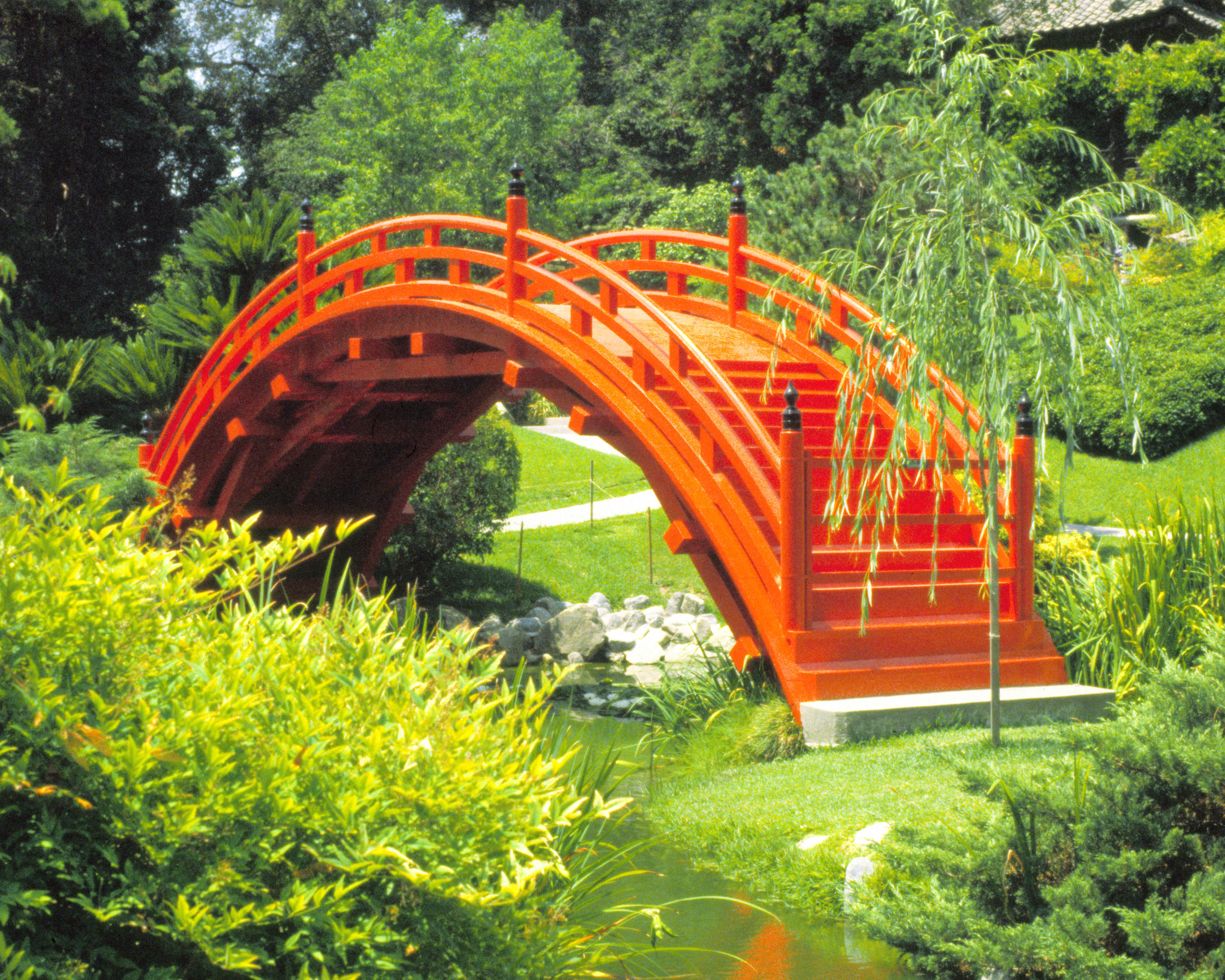
The Japanese Garden bridge

In 1911, art dealer George Turner Marsh (who also created the Japanese Tea Garden at the Golden Gate Park) sold his commercial Japanese tea garden to Henry E. Huntington to create the foundations of what is known today as the Japanese Garden. The garden was completed in 1912 and opened to the public in 1928. According to historian Kendall Brown, the garden consists of three gardens: the original stroll garden with koi-filled ponds and a drum or moon bridge, the raked-gravel dry garden added in 1968, and the traditionally landscaped tea garden.

In addition, the gardens feature a large bell, the authentic ceremonial teahouse Seifu-an (the Arbor of Pure Breeze), a fully furnished Japanese house, the Zen Garden, and the bonsai collections with hundreds of trees. The Bonsai Courts at the Huntington is the home of the Golden State Bonsai Federation Southern Collection. Another ancient Japanese art form can be found at the Harry Hirao Suiseki Court, where visitors can touch the suiseki or viewing stones.

=== Other gardens ===
- Australian Garden
- Camellia Garden
- Children's Garden
- Conservatory
- Herb Garden
- Jungle Garden
- Lily Ponds
- Palm Garden
- Ranch Garden
- Rose Garden
- Shakespeare Garden
- Subtropical Garden

== Presidents ==
Nine individuals have led the Huntington Library since it was first created as a historical research organization in 1924. Below is the list of those leaders, initially holding the title Director until 1988 when the title was changed to President. Also included in this list are acting/interim leaders.

No.	Image	President	Term start	Term end	Ref.
Directors of the Huntington Library (1924–1988)
1		Max Farrand	October 1, 1927	June 30, 1941	
2		Wallace Sterling	July 1, 1948	March 1949 (Note: Resigned to lead Stanford University.)	
3		John Edwin Pomfret	November 1951	September 30, 1966	
4		James Thorpe	October 1, 1966	August 31, 1983	
5		Robert Middlekauff	September 1, 1983	December 31, 1987	
interim		Martin Ridge	January 1, 1988	June 30, 1988	
Presidents of the Huntington Library (1988–present)
6		Robert A. Skotheim	July 1, 1988	June 30, 2001	
7		Steven S. Koblik	September 1, 2001	June 30, 2015	
8		Laura Skandera Trombley	July 1, 2015	March 28, 2017	
acting		Steve Hindle	March 29, 2017	August 31, 2018	
9		Karen R. Lawrence	September 1, 2018	present	

Table notes:

== In popular culture ==
The Huntington Botanical Gardens were honored with a postal stamp as a part of the American Gardens stamps on May 13, 2020. The Desert Garden was featured.

The gardens are frequently used as a filming location. Footage shot there has been included in:

Name	Year
Mame	1974
Only Yesterday (music video) – Carpenters	1975
Midway	1976
Star Trek: The Next Generation, in Justice	1987
Heathers	1988
Ordinary World (music video) – Duran Duran	1993
Indecent Proposal	1993
Beverly Hills Ninja	1997
JAG, used as the White House rose garden	1997
The Wedding Singer	1998
Mystery Men	1999
Charlie's Angels	2000
The Wedding Planner	2001
The Hot Chick	2002
S1m0ne	2002
Anger Management	2003
The West Wing, used as the National Arboretum	2003
Intolerable Cruelty	2003
Starsky & Hutch	2004
Monster-in-Law	2005
Memoirs of a Geisha	2005
Serenity	2005
Ned's Declassified School Survival Guide, in its finale	2007
National Treasure: Book of Secrets, used as the White House rose garden	2007
CSI Miami, in You May Now Kill the Bride	2008
G.I. Joe: The Rise of Cobra, used during the flashback fighting scenes between ten-year-old Snake Eyes and Storm Shadow.	2009
A Beautiful End (music video) – J.R. Richards	2009
Private Practice, used during the wedding scene between Violet Turner and Pete Wilder, in the episode Takes Two	2010
The Muppets	2011
Bridesmaids, the driveway to Helen's bridal shower	2011
Parks and Recreation, used as Five Mile Grounds, the new Eagleton park, in the episode Pawnee Commons	2012
The Good Place, as the afterlife's fictional setting	2016–2020
Garden Song, mentioned by name.	2020

== Gallery ==
Images of the Huntington Gardens

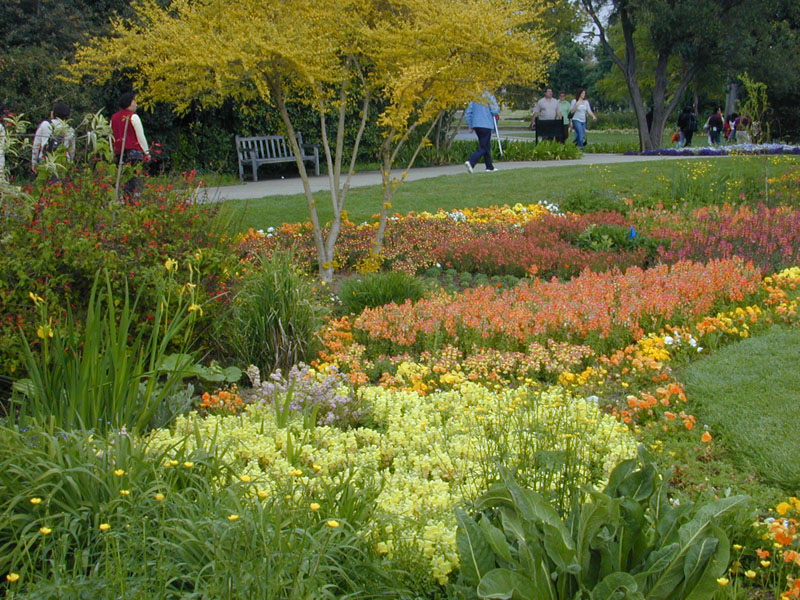
Colorful flowers

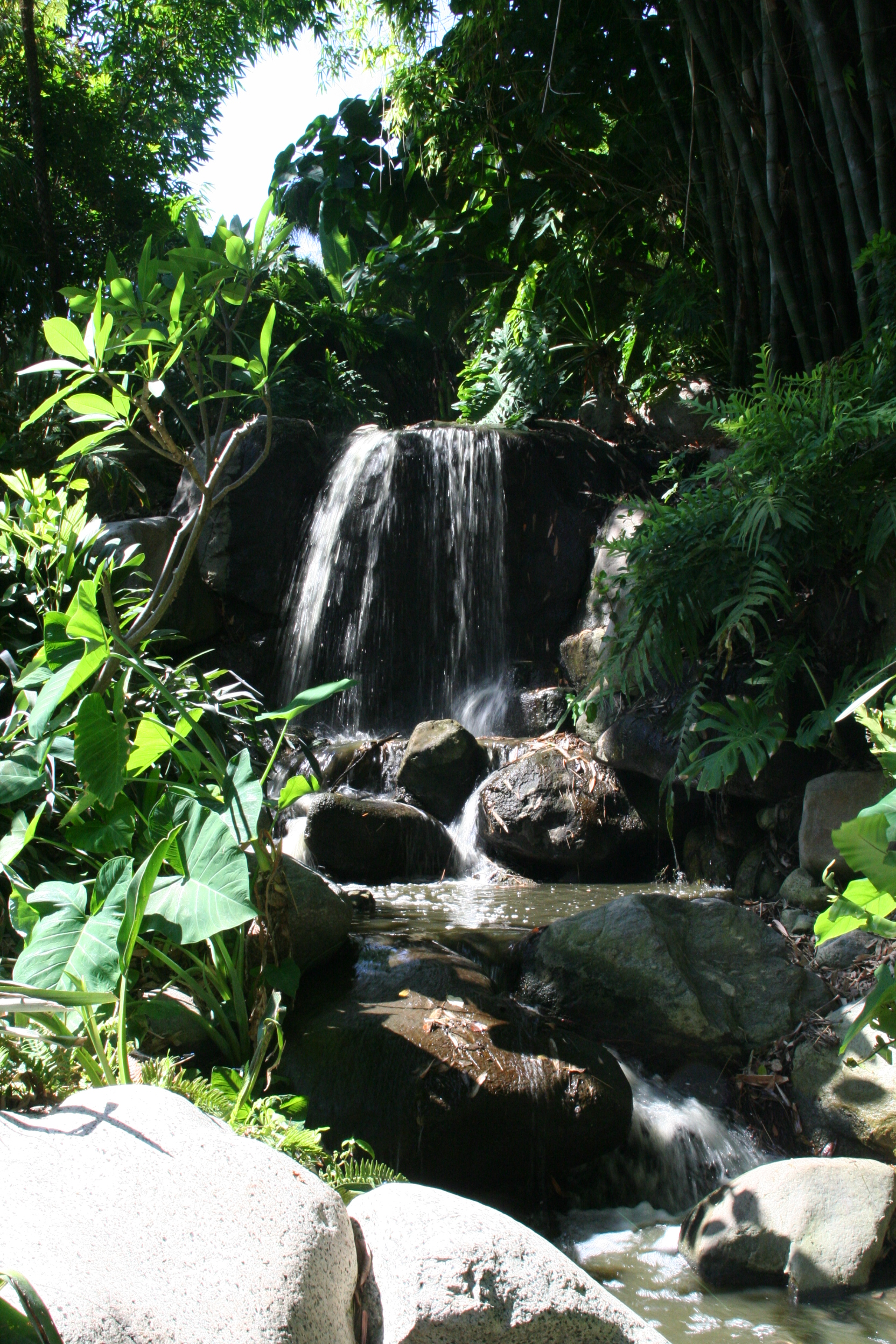
Jungle Garden

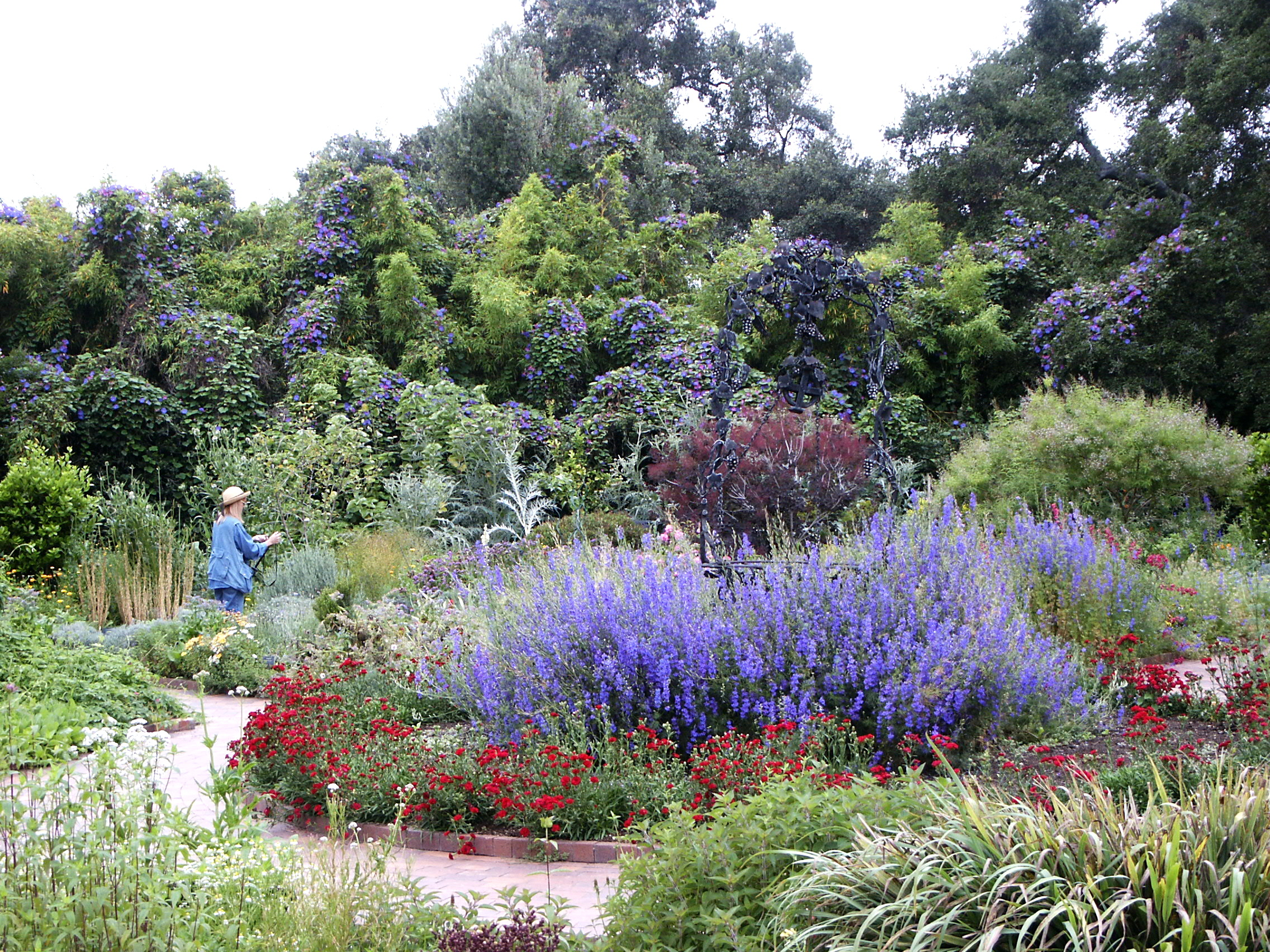
Spring bloom in the Herb Garden

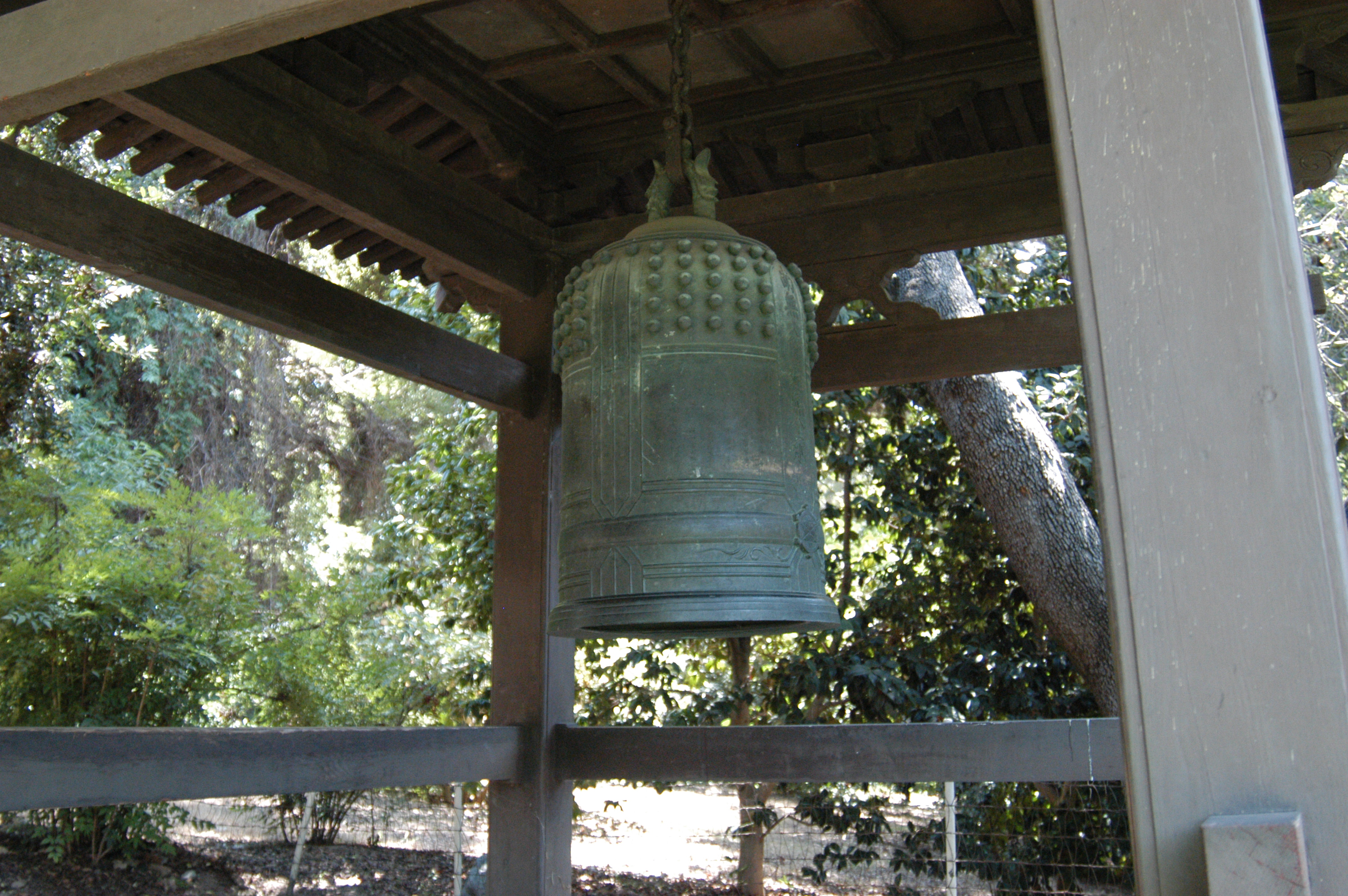
Japanese Garden bell

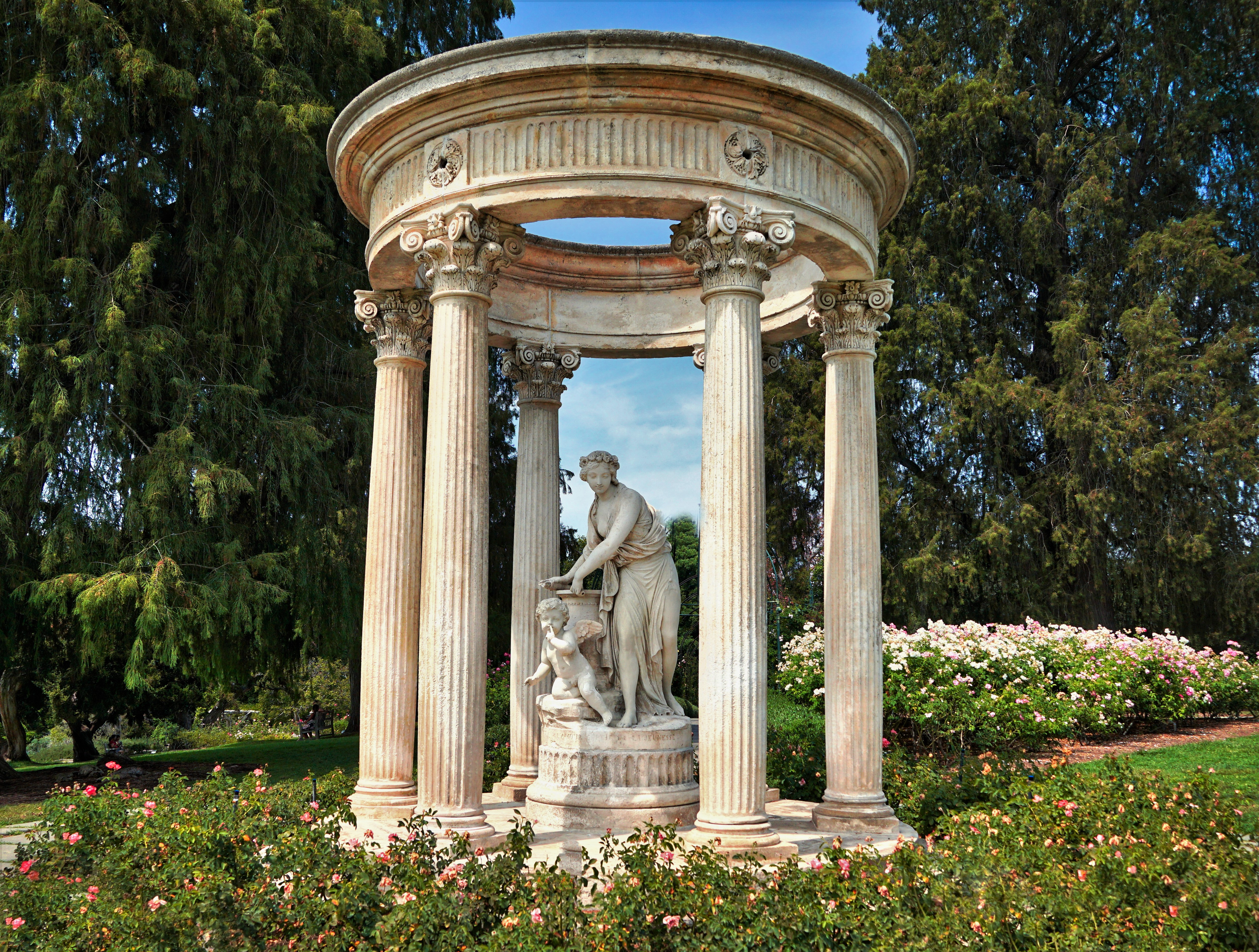
Classical Garden Pavilion

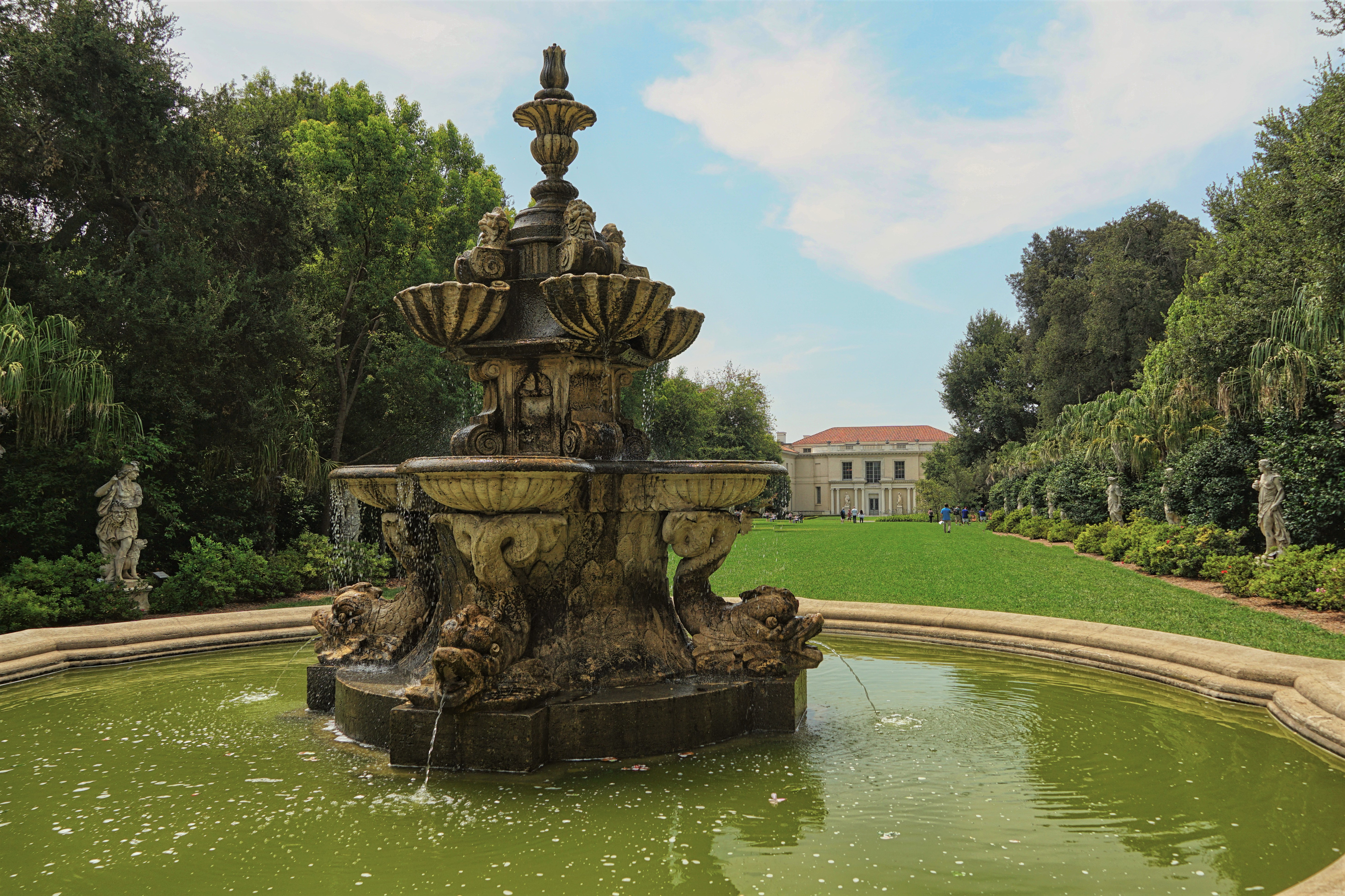
Fountain on the Great Lawn

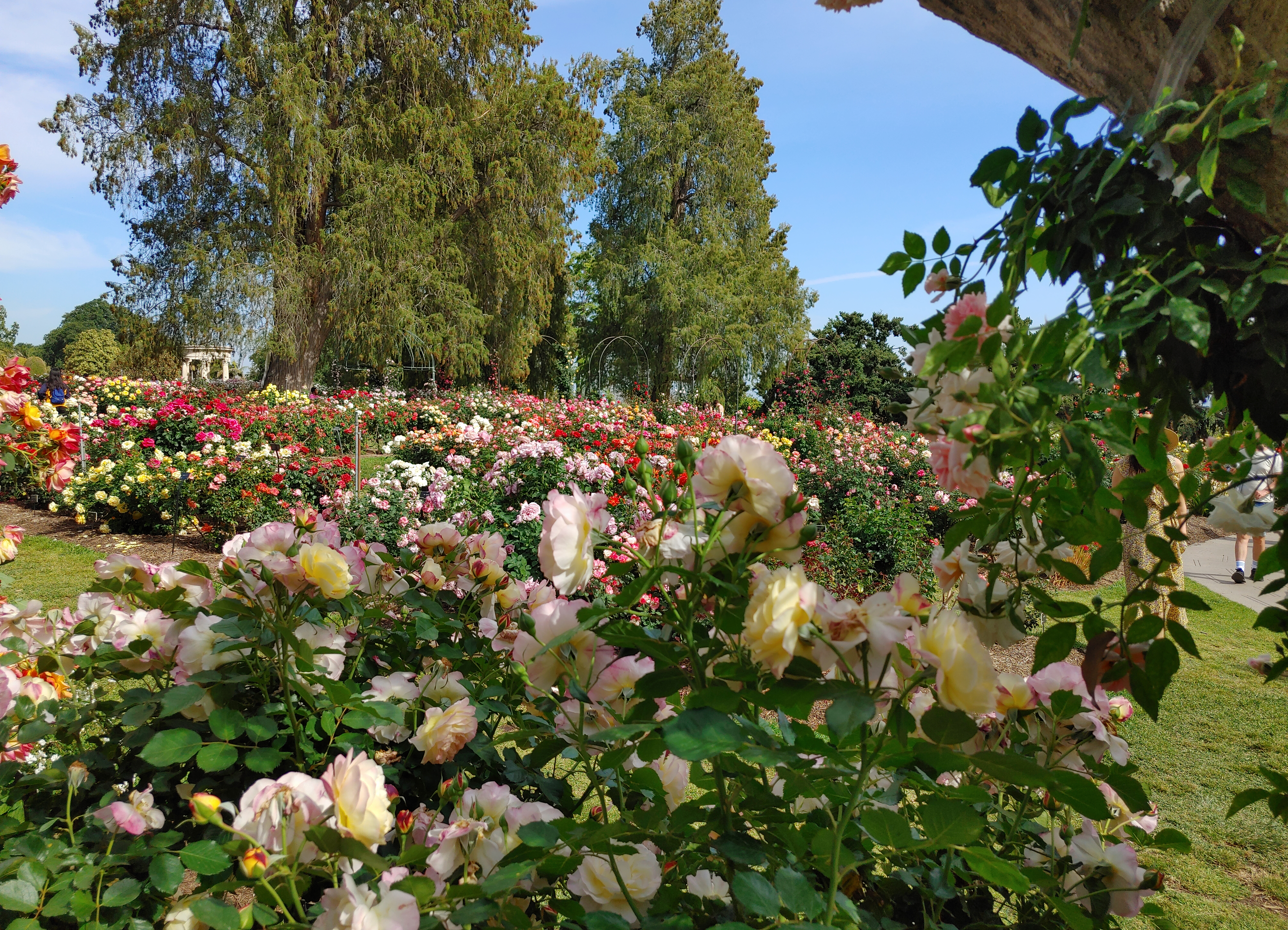
Blooming Roses in April 2022

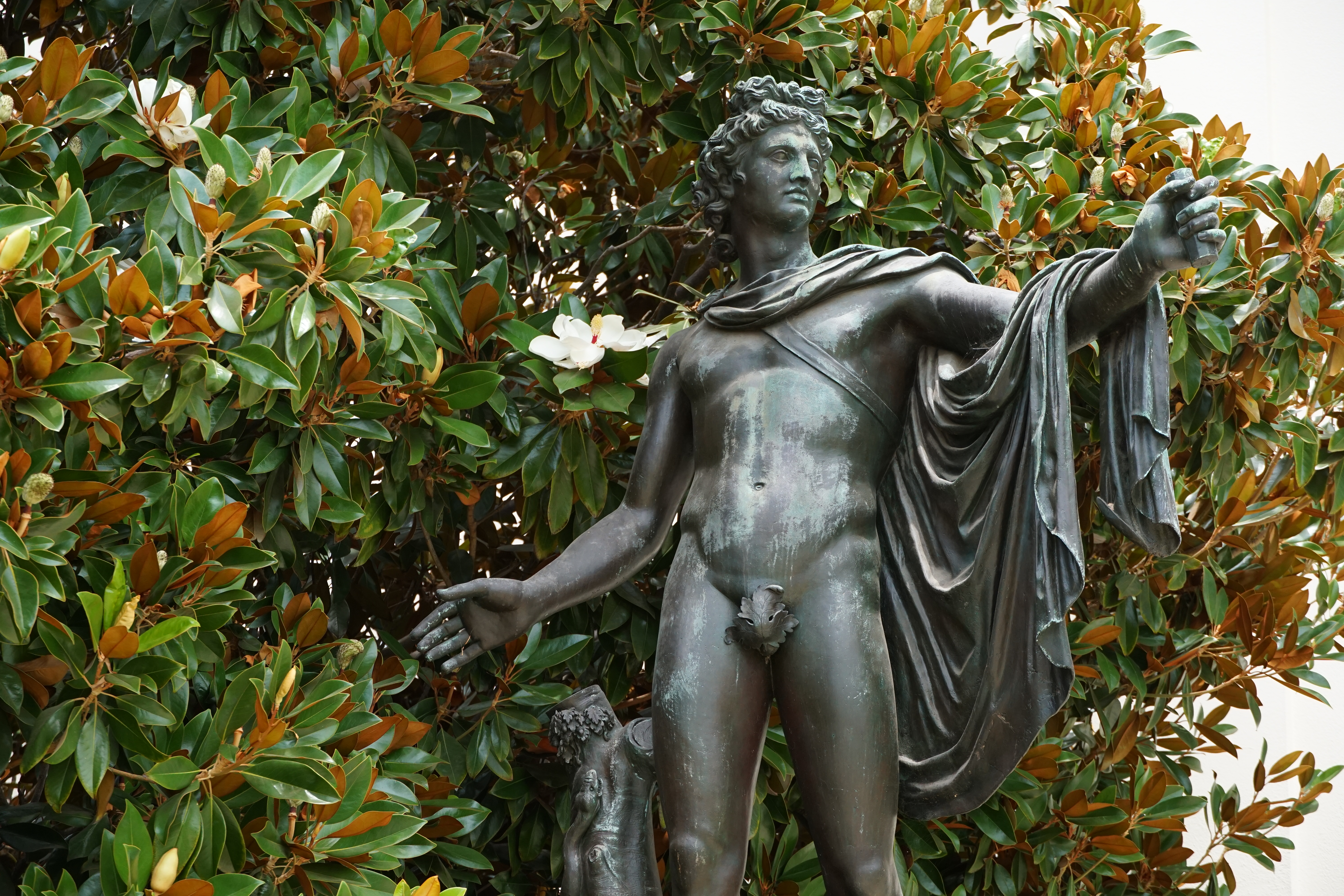
Neo-Classical garden sculpture

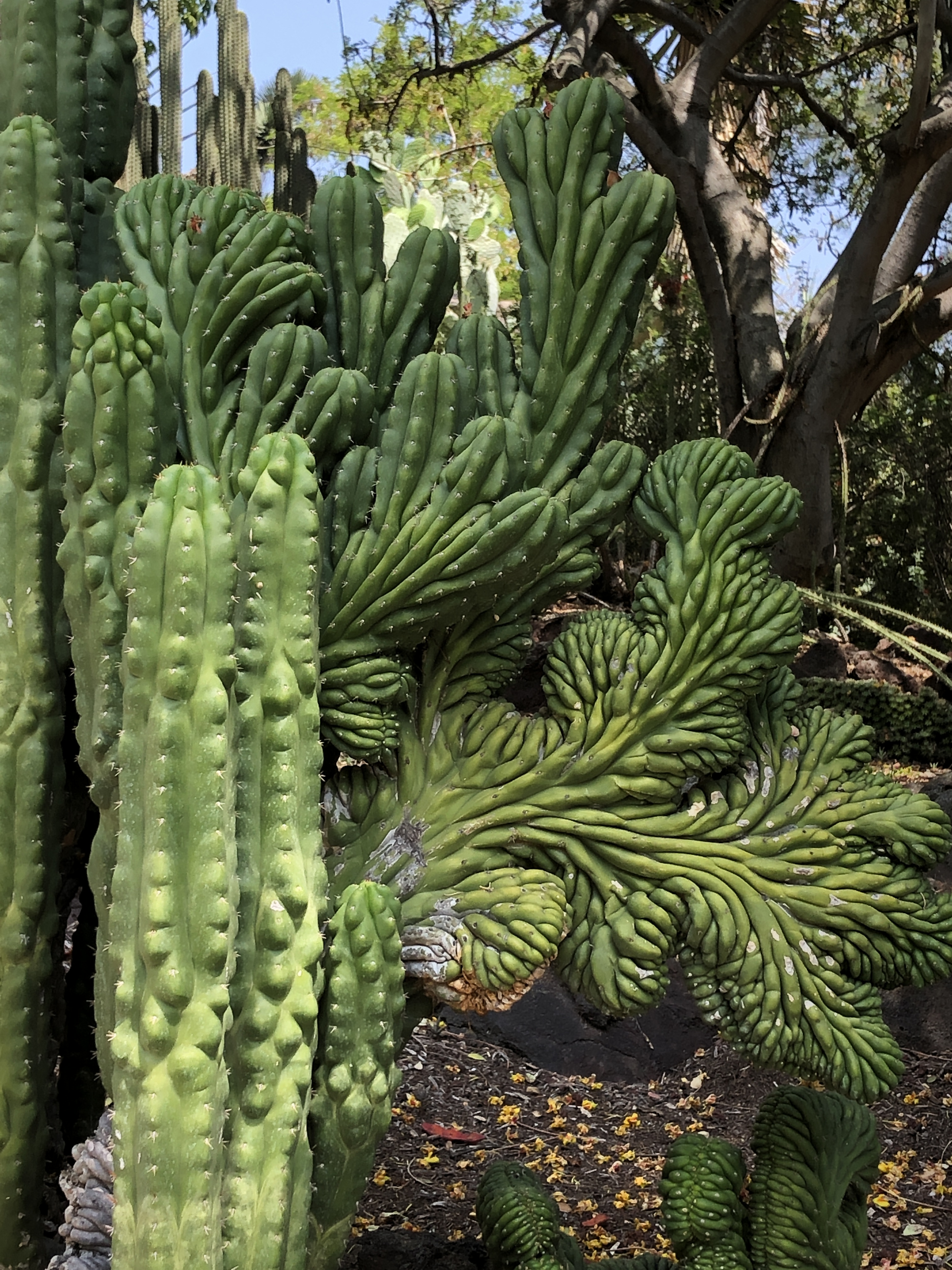
Succulent plants in the Desert Garden

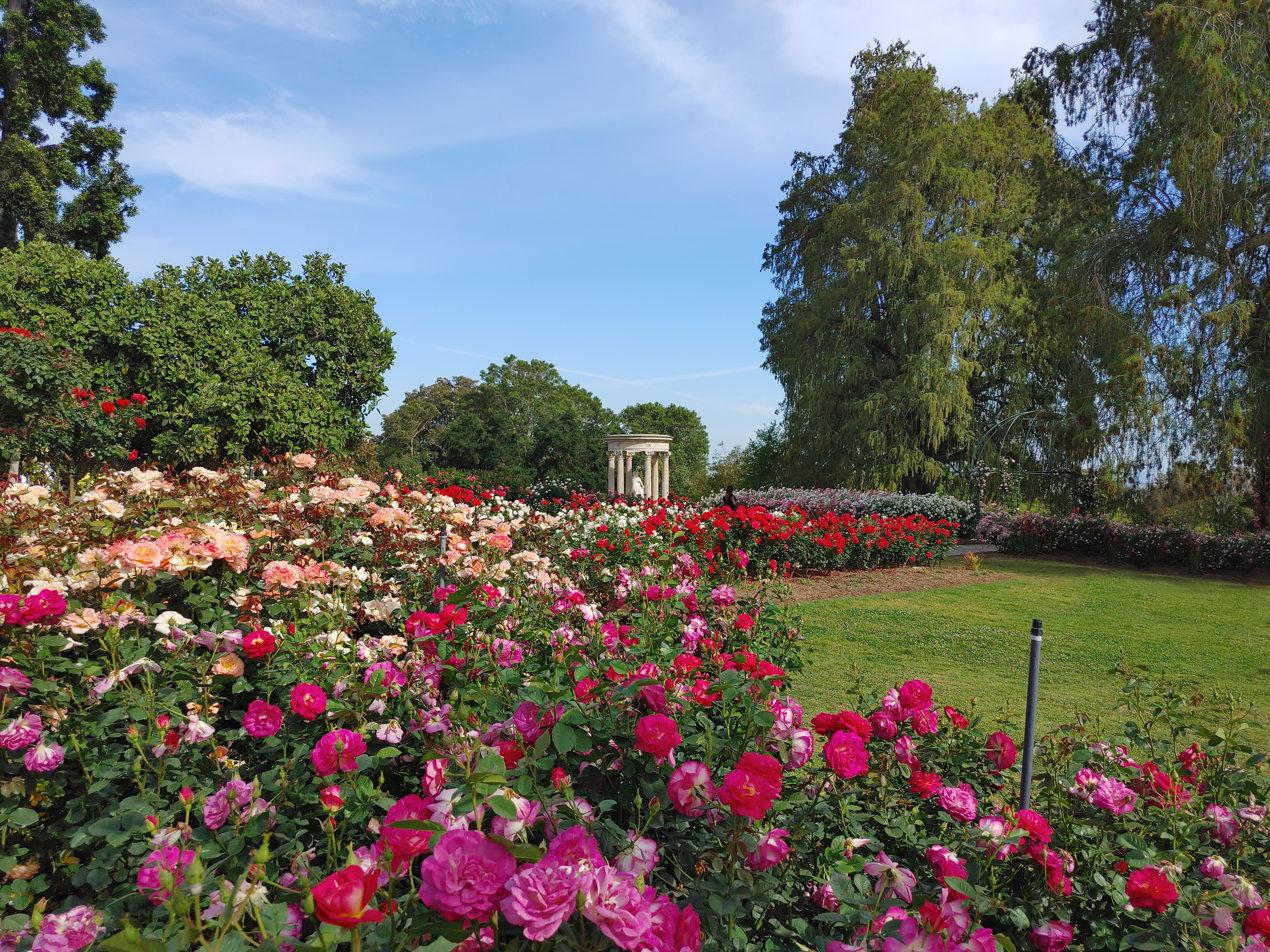
Rose Garden in bloom, April 2022
Flowers in the Huntington Gardens

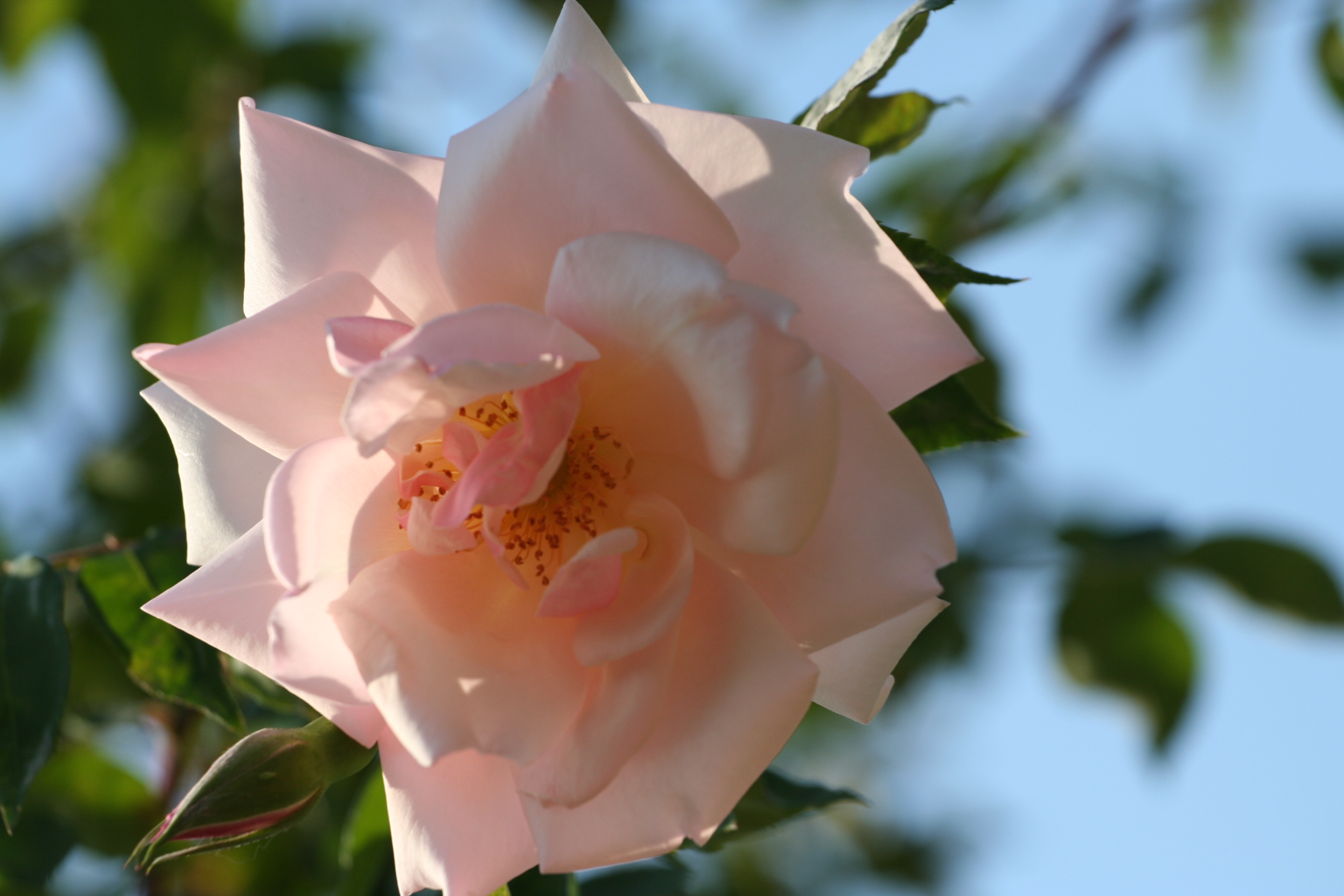
Rose

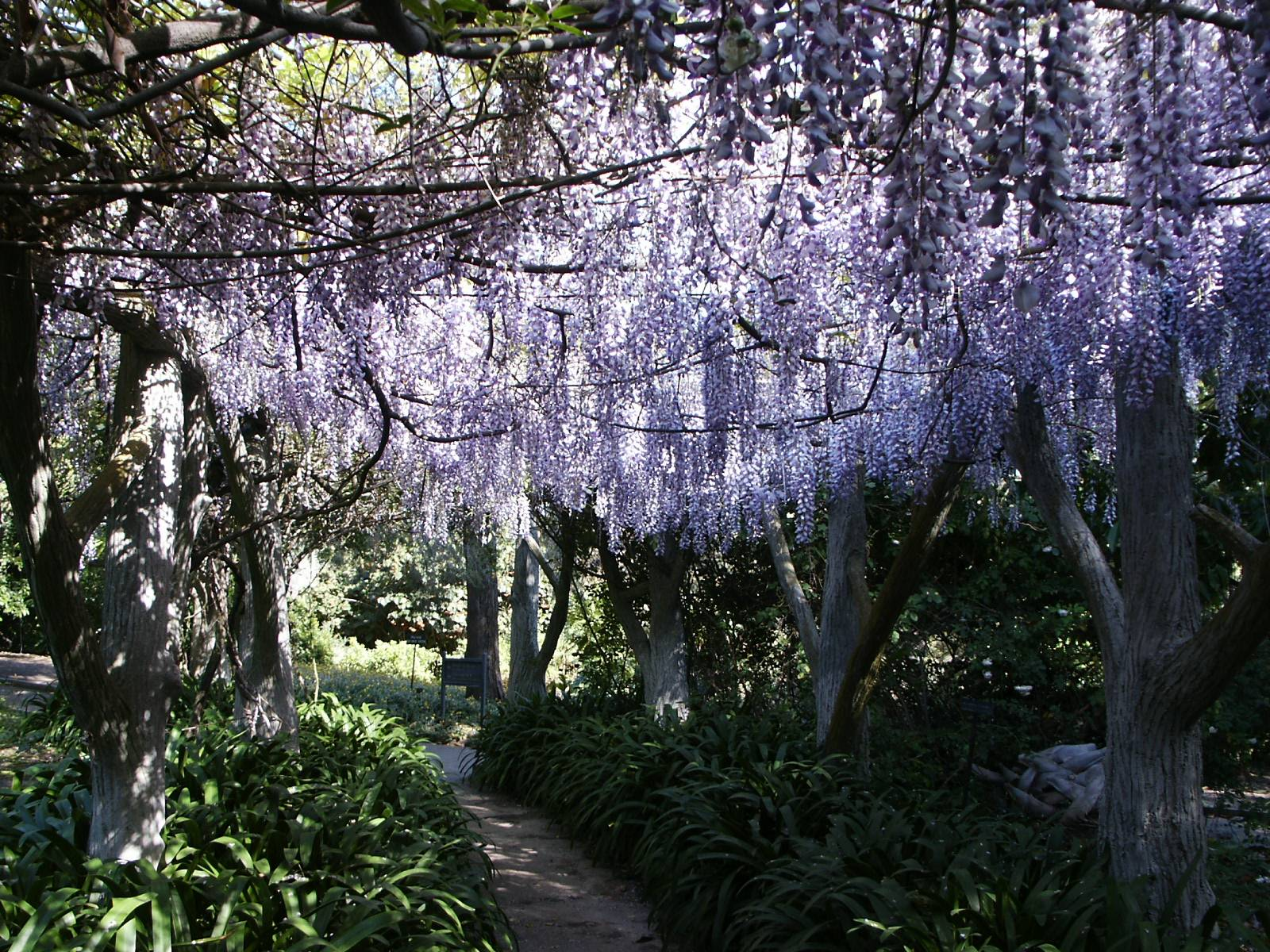
Wisteria arbor, April 2009

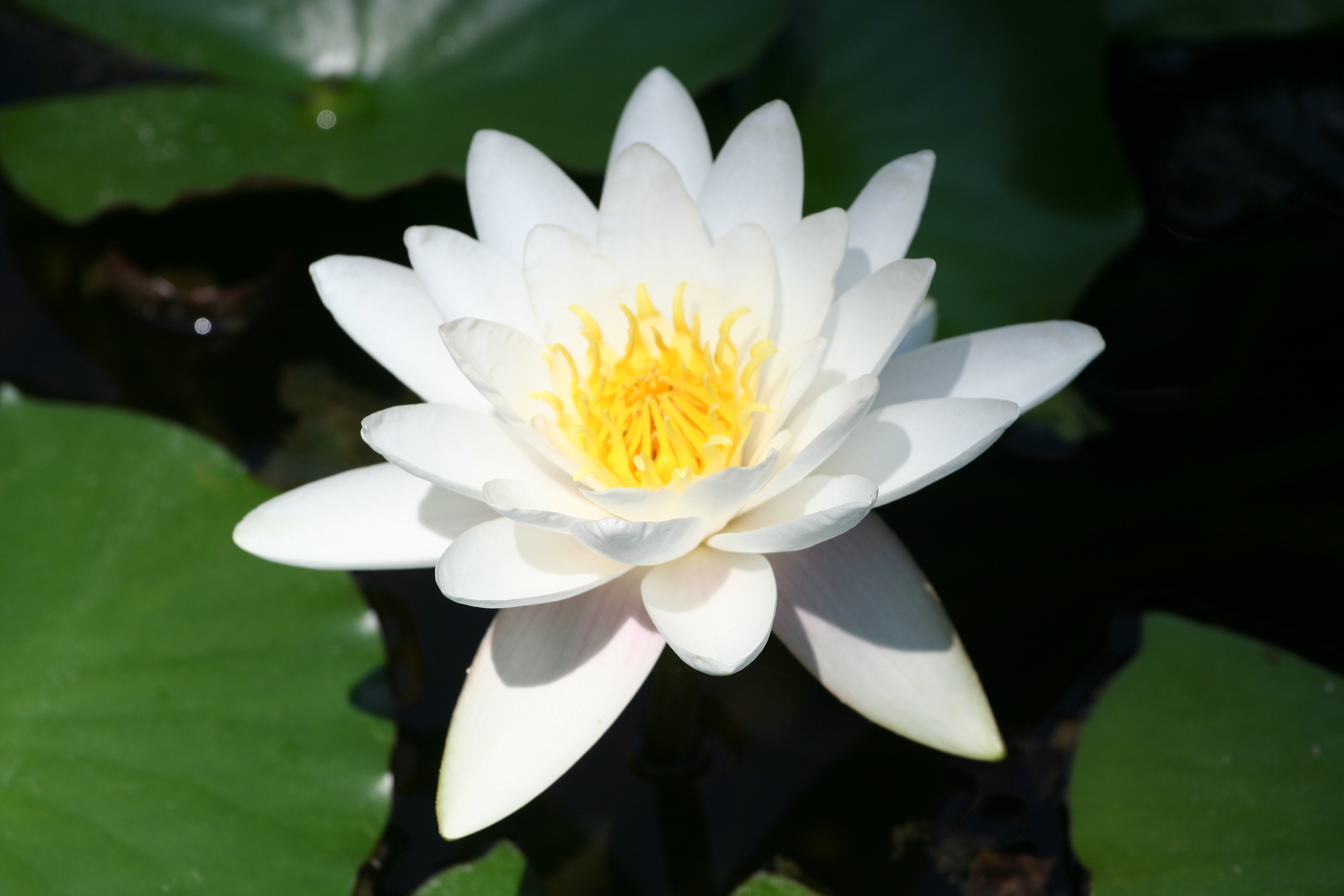
Water lily

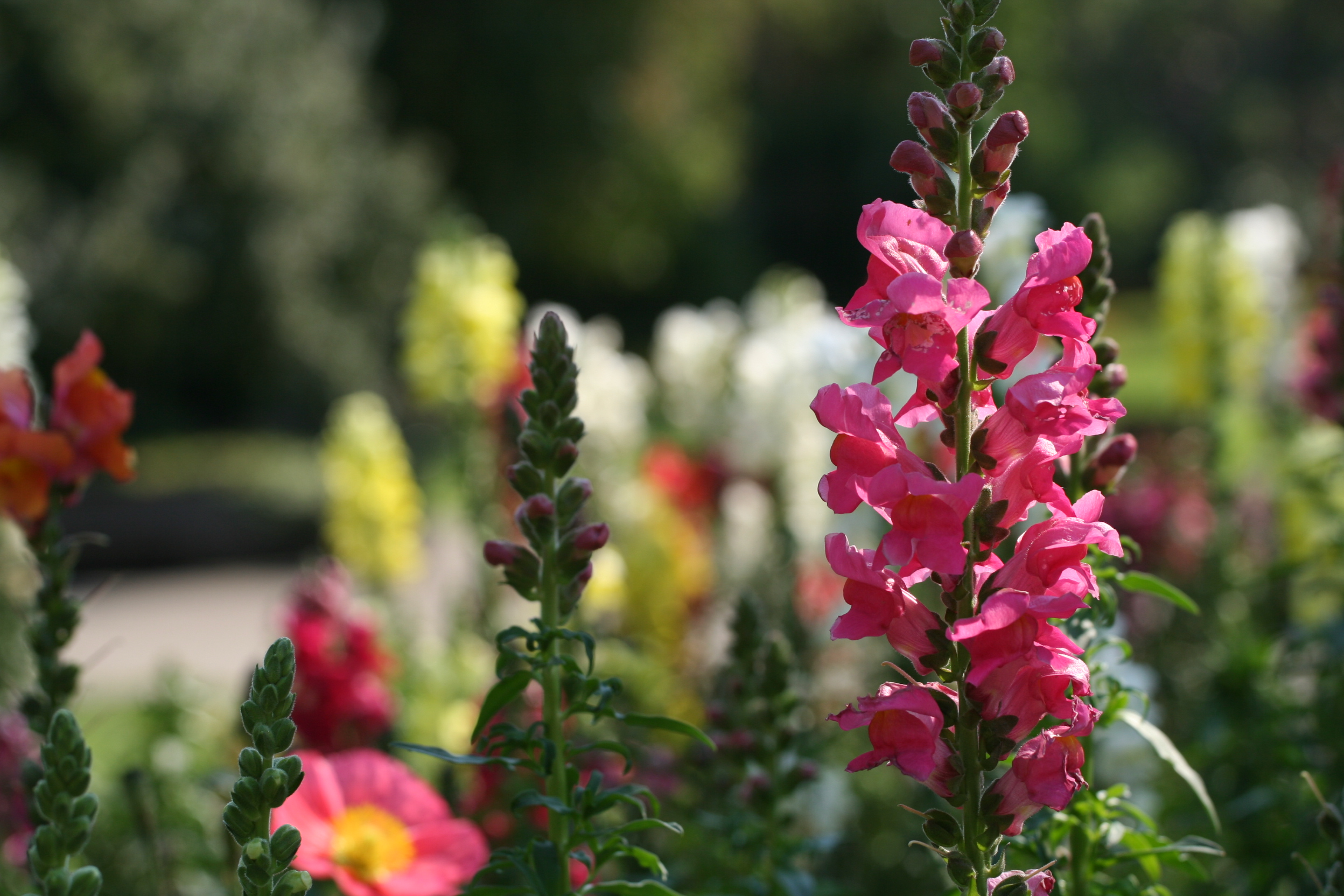
Snapdragons
Trees in the Huntington Gardens

Ficus auriculata leaves

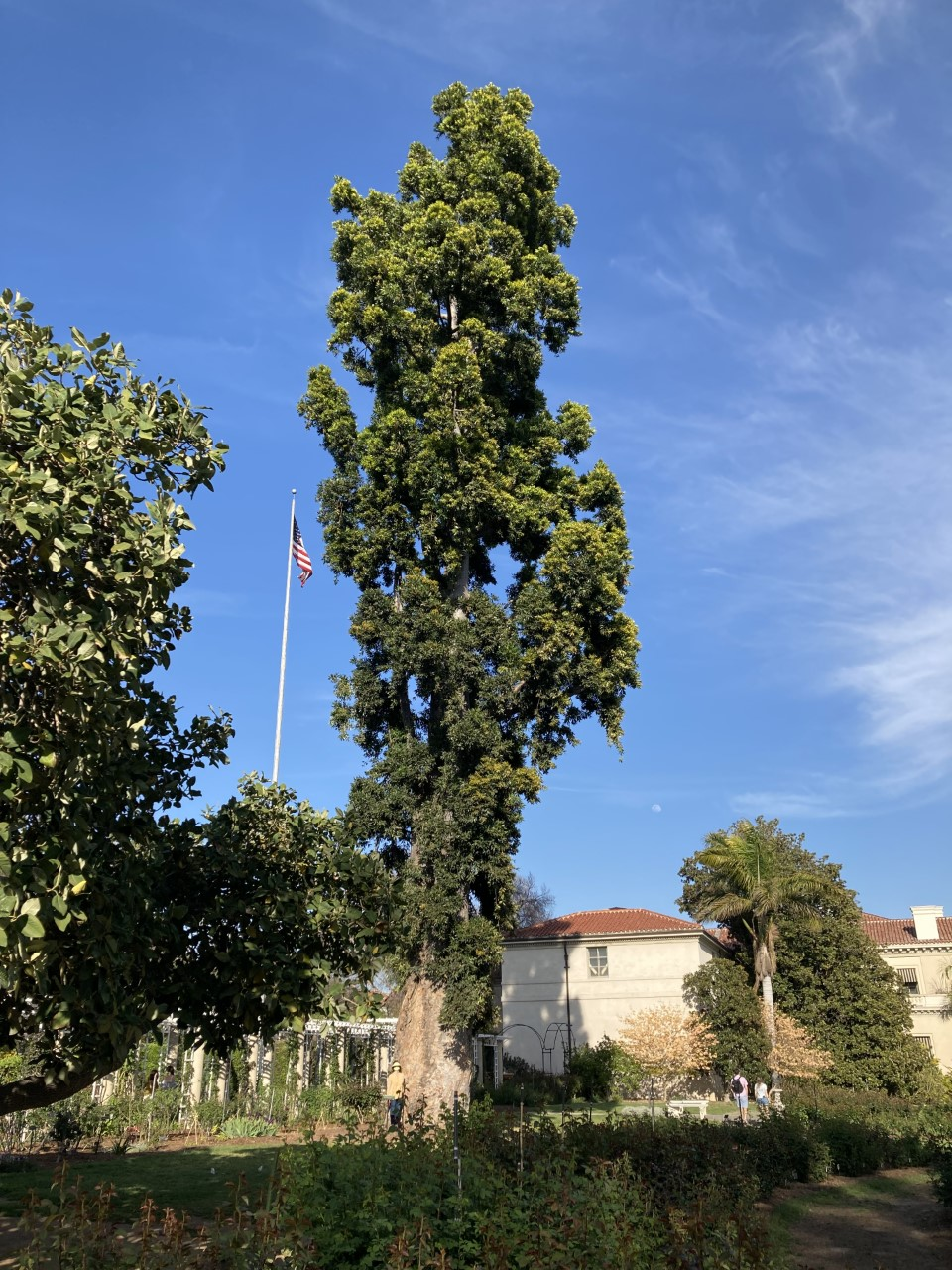
Agathis robusta in the Rose Garden

== See also ==
- The Constance Perkins House, donated to the Library in 1991
- List of botanical gardens in the United States
- List of museums in California

== Additional sources ==
- Hertrich, William (1998). The Huntington Botanical Gardens, 1905–1949: Personal Recollections of William Hertrich. Huntington Library Press. ISBN 978-0-87328-096-9. 1949 edition at the Internet Archive. 1988 edition (2003 reprint) at HathiTrust.
